= List of mycologists =

Scientists specialising in the study of fungi

This is a non-exhaustive list of mycologists, or scientists with a specialisation in mycology, with their author abbreviations. Because the study of lichens is traditionally considered a branch of mycology, lichenologists are included in this list.

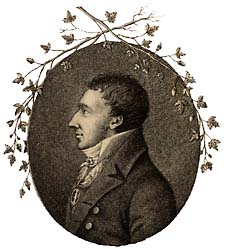
Erik Acharius (1757–1857) pioneered the taxonomy of lichens.

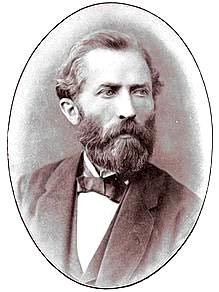
Heinrich Anton de Bary (1831–1888) made extensive contributions to the understanding of plant pathology.

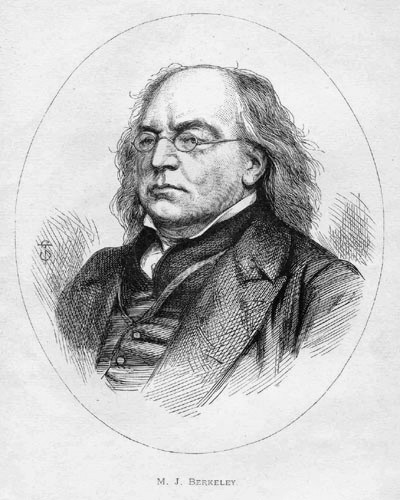
Miles Joseph Berkeley (1803–1889), an English botanist and clergyman, was a founder of the science of plant pathology.

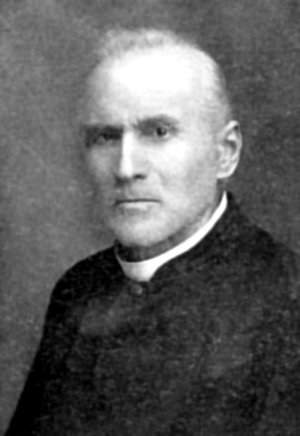
Giacomo Bresadola (1847–1929) was a founding member of the Société mycologique de France.

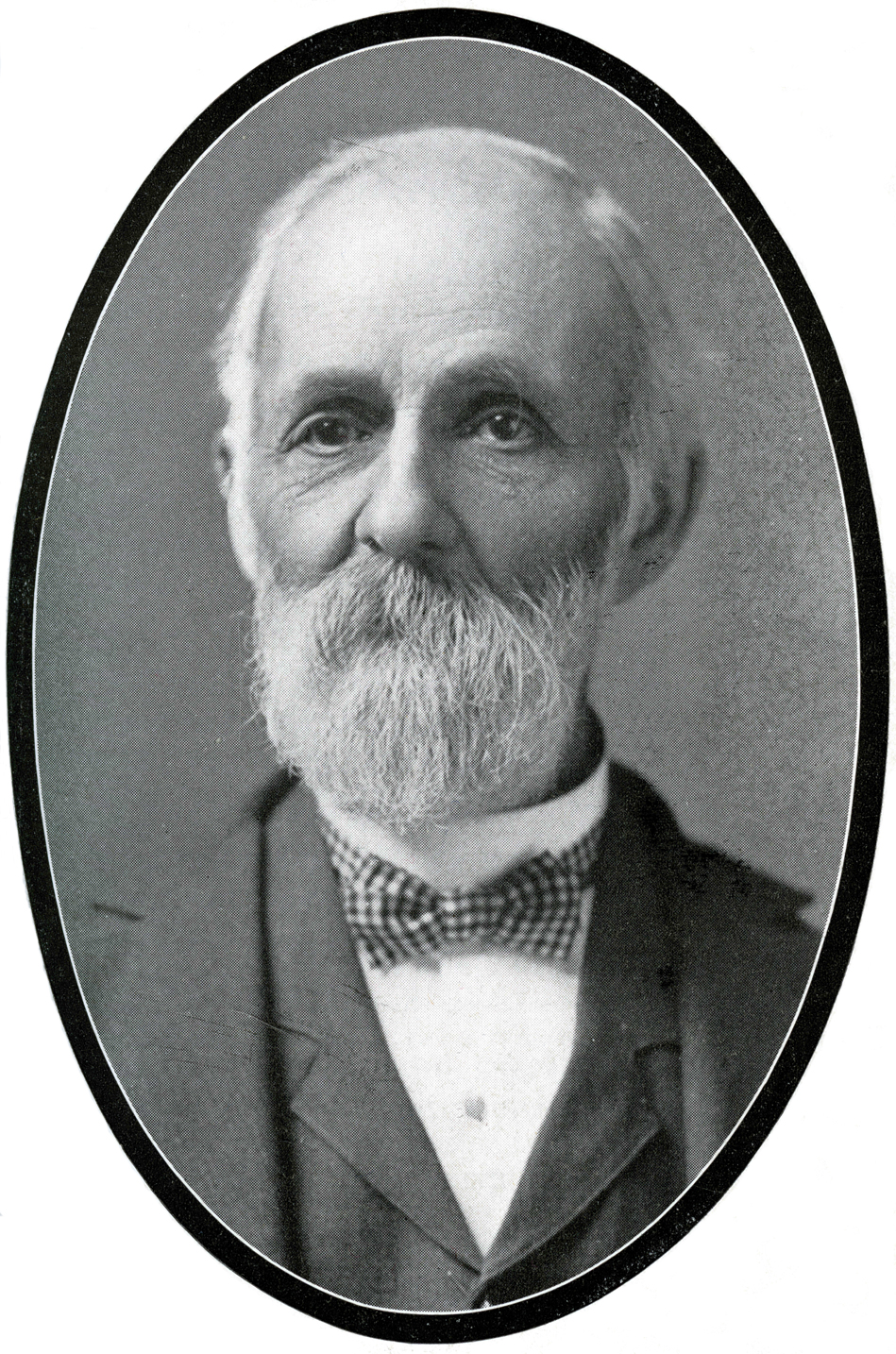
The pioneering North American mycologist Job Bicknell Ellis described over 4000 species of fungi, and collected over 100,000 specimens.

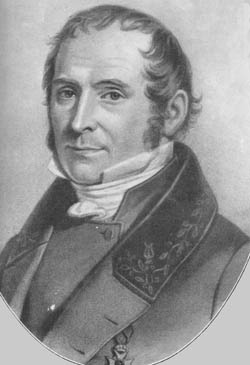
Elias Magnus Fries (1794–1878) was the founding father of the modern taxonomy of mushrooms.

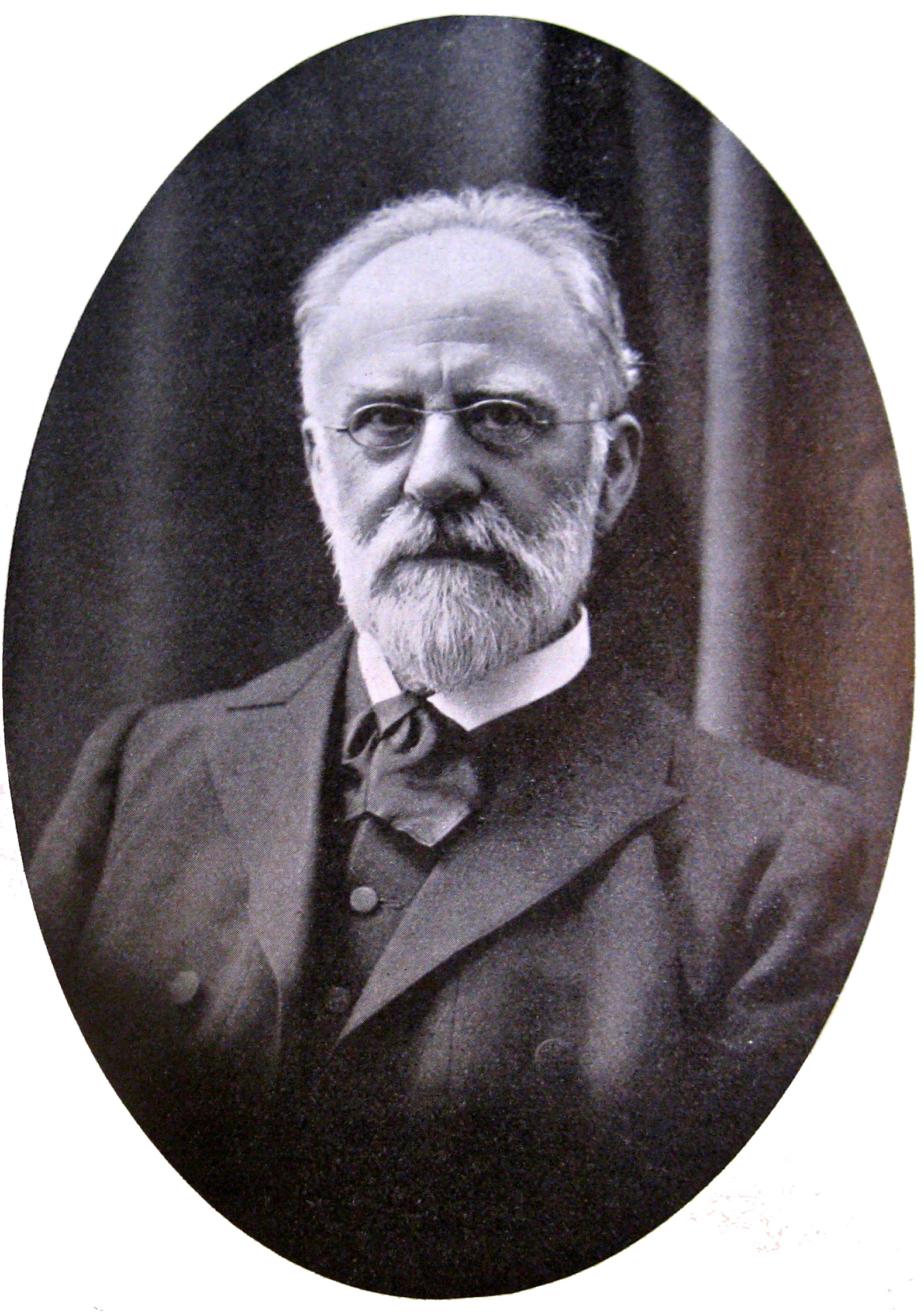
Emil Christian Hansen (1842–1909) described Saccharomyces carlsbergensis, a yeast used industrially for the production of lager beer.

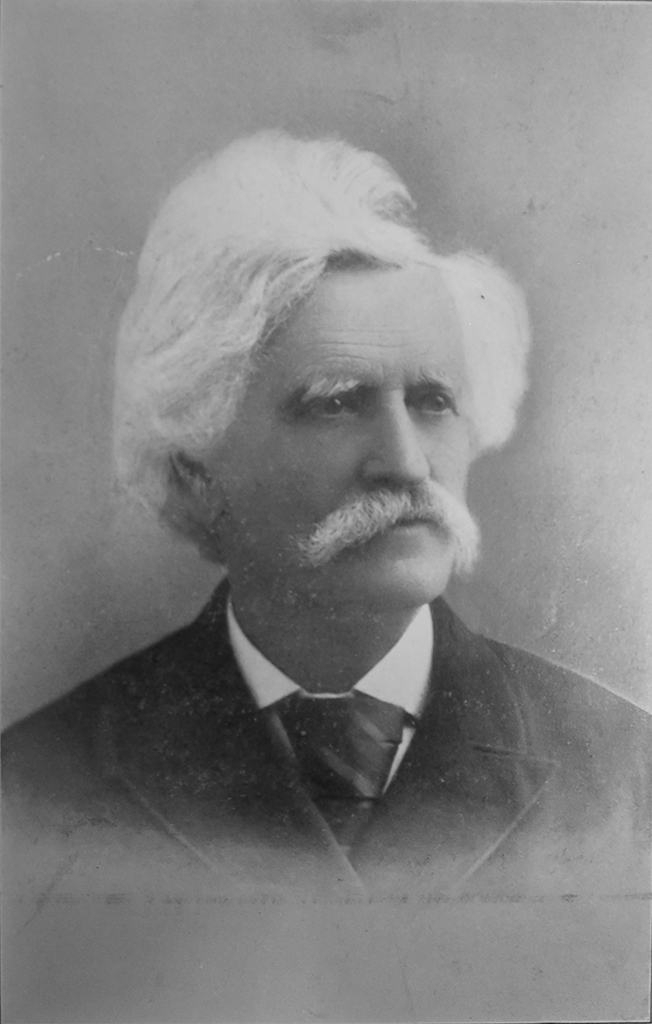
H. W. Harkness (1821–1901) catalogued the fungi of California.

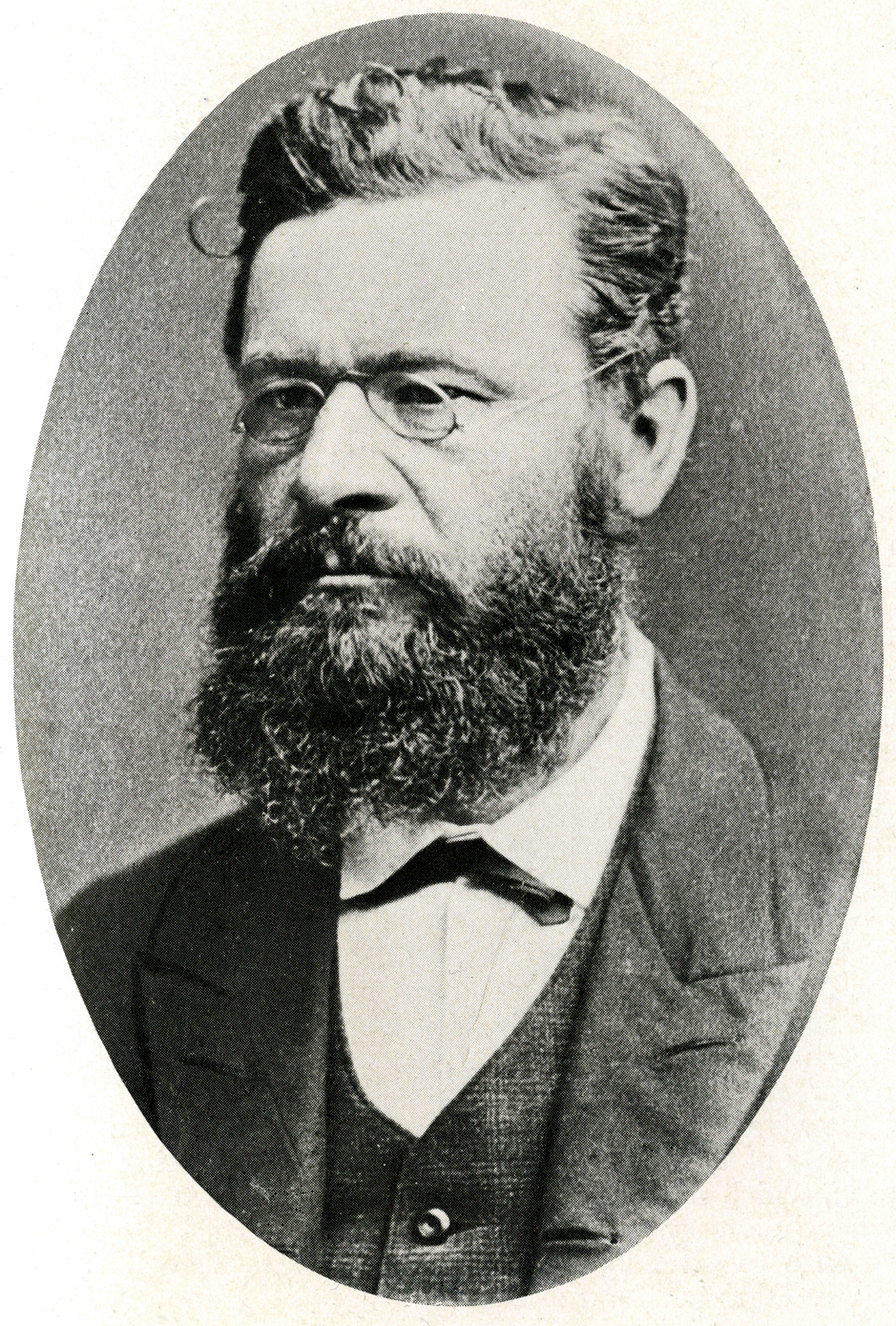
Petter Adolf Karsten (1834–1917) is considered the "father of Finnish mycology".

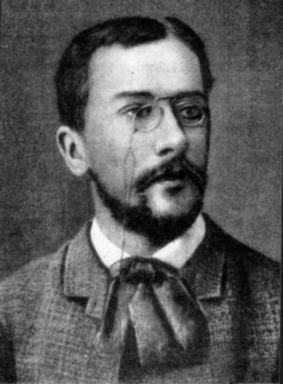
Inspired by his work with lichens, the Russian botanist Konstantin Mereschkowski (1855–1921) proposed the theory of symbiogenesis.

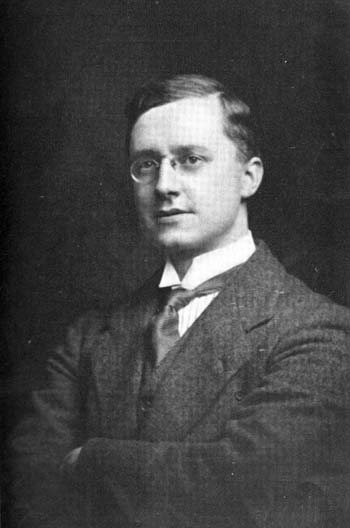
John Ramsbottom (1885–1974) was twice president of the British Mycological Society.

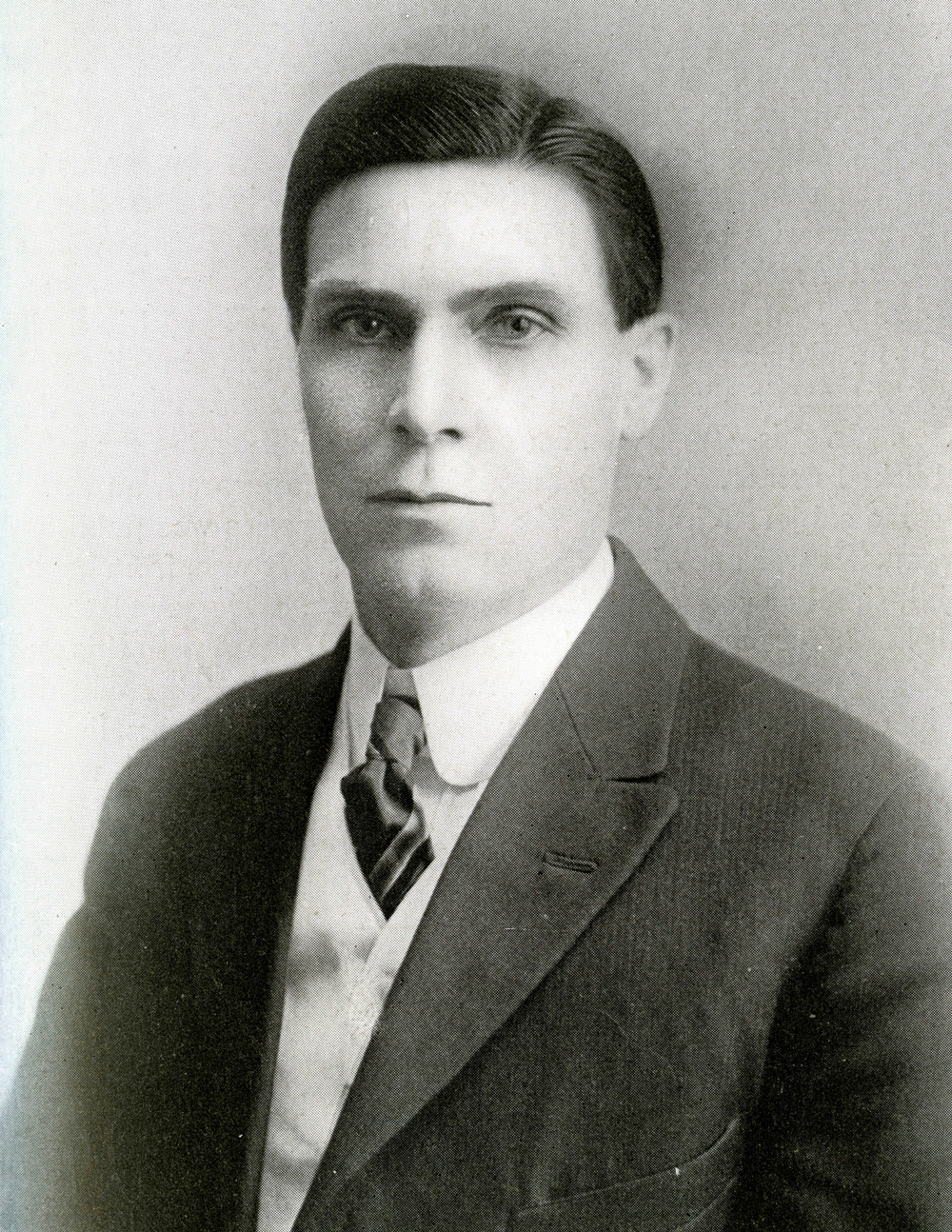
Fred Jay Seaver, a curator at the New York Botanical Garden and editor of the journal Mycologia between 1909 and 1947, specialised in the Discomycetes.

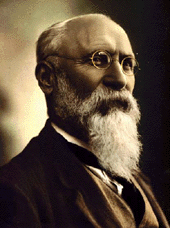
Carlos Luigi Spegazzini (1858–1926)

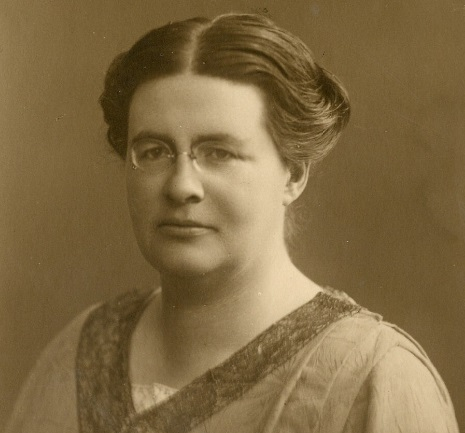
Johanna Westerdijk (1883–1961)

Name	Born	Died	Abbrev.	Reference
Hubertus Antonius van der Aa	1935	2017	Aa	
Helene Schalkwijk-Barendsen	1921	2010		
John Errol Chandos Aberdeen	1913	1996	Aberdeen	
Ivan Nikolayevich Abramov	1884	1953	Abramov	
Erik Acharius	1757	1819	Ach.	
Slavomír Adamčík			Adamčík	
Michel Adanson	1727	1806	Adans.	
Rudolph Ferdinand Theodor Aderhold	1865	1907	Aderh.	
Adam Afzelius	1750	1837	Afzel.	
Carl Adolph Agardh	1785	1859	C.Agardh	
Jacob Georg Agardh	1813	1901	J.Agardh	
Geoffrey Clough Ainsworth	1905	1998	Ainsw.	
Libero Ajello	1916	2004	Ajello	
Henry Carl Aldrich	1941	2005		
Carlo Luciano Alessio	1919	2006	Alessio	
Constantine John Alexopolous	1907	1986	Alexop.	
John W. Allen	1942		Allen	
Ruth F. Allen	1879	1963		
Lawrence Marion Ames	1900	1966	L.M.Ames	
Josef Anders	1863	1936	Anders	
David Arora	1953		D.Arora	
Joseph Charles Arthur	1850	1942	Arthur	
Sydney Francis Ashby	1874	1954	Ashby	
George Francis Atkinson	1854	1918	G.F.Atk.	
Churchill Babington	1821	1889	C.Bab.	
Kamila Bacigálová			Bacigálová	
Charles David Badham	1805	1857	Badham	
Gladys Elizabeth Baker	1908	2007	G.E.Baker	
Giuseppe Gabriel Balsamo-Crivelli	1800	1874	Bals.-Criv.	
Robert Joseph Bandoni	1926	2009	Bandoni	
Howard James Banker	1866	1940	Banker	
Mary Elizabeth Banning	1832	1901	Banning	
Alma Joslyn Whiffen-Barksdale	1916	1981	Whiffen	
Margaret Elizabeth Barr-Bigelow	1923	2008	M.E.Barr	
Heinrich Anton de Bary	1831	1888	de Bary	
Lekh Raj Batra	1929	1999	L.R.Batra	
August Batsch	1761	1802	Batsch	
Giovanni Antonio Battarra	1714	1789	Batarra	
Robert Bauer	1950	2014	R.Bauer	
Gaspard Bauhin	1560	1624	C.Bauhin	
Johann Bauhin	1541	1613	J.Bauhin	
Johann Andreas Bäumler	1847	1926	Bäumler	
Henry Curtis Beardslee	1865	1948	Beardslee	
Jean Beauverie	1874	1938	Beauverie	
Günther Beck von Mannagetta und Lerchenau	1856	1931	Beck	
Maurice Beeli	1879	1957	Beeli	
Everett Smith Beneke	1918	2010	Beneke	
Rhoda Williams Benham	1894	1957		
Chester Ray Benjamin	1923	2002	C.R.Benj.	
Richard Keith Benjamin	1922	2002	R.K.Benj.	
Mathilde Bensaude	1890	1969		
Miles Joseph Berkeley	1803	1889	Berk.	
Christine Marie Berkhout	1893	1932	Berkh.	
Augusto Napoleone Berlese	1864	1903	Berl.	
Ernst Bessey	1877	1957	E.A.Bessey	
Agathe L. van Beverwijk	1907	1963	Beverw.	
Howard E. Bigelow	1923	1987	H.E.Bigelow	
Chapman Hunter Binford	1900	1990	Binford	
Philbert Biourge	1864	1942	Biourge	
Guy Richard Bisby	1889	1958	Bisby	
Meredith Blackwell	1940		Blackwell	
Albert Francis Blakeslee	1874	1954	Blakeslee	
Carl Ludwig Blume	1789	1862	Blume	
James Bolton	1758	1799	Bolton	
Marcel Bon	1925	2014	Bon	
Hermann Friedrich Bonorden	1801	1884	Bonord.	
Aimé Bonpland	1773	1858	Bonpl.	
Jean Louis Émile Boudier	1828	1920	Boud.	
Hubert Bourdot	1861	1937	Bourdot	
Julius Oscar Brefeld	1839	1925	Bref.	
Giacomo Bresadola	1847	1929	Bres.	
Nathaniel Lord Britton	1859	1934	Britton	
Max Britzelmayr	1839	1909	Britzelm.	
Irwin M. Brodo	1935		Brodo	
Frederick Tom Brooks	1882	1952	F.T.Brooks	
Christopher Edmund Broome	1812	1886	Broome	
Arthur Henry Reginald Buller	1874	1944	Buller	
Jean Baptiste François Pierre Bulliard	1742	1793	Bull.	
Britt Bunyard	1966			
Gertrude Simmons Burlingham	1872	1952	Burl.	
John Harrison Burnett	1922	2007	J.H.Burnett	
Thomas Jonathan Burrill	1839	1916	Burrill	
Edward Angus Burt	1859	1939	Burt	
Edwin John Butler	1874	1943	E.J.Butler	
Jan Bystrek	1934	2020	Bystrek	
Miroslav Caboň			Caboň	
Rudolf Cáfal			Cáfal	
Charlotte C. Campbell	1914	1993		
Augustin Pyramus de Candolle	1778	1841	DC.	
George Washington Carver	1864	1943	Carver	
Edith Katherine Cash	1890	1992	E.K.Cash	
Michael Angelo Castellano	1956		Castellano	
Karel Cejp	1900	1979	Cejp	
Ladislav František Čelakovský	1863	1916	L.F.Čelák.	
Zdeněk Černohorský	1910	2001	Čern.	
Bruno Cetto	1921	1991		
Ignacio Chapela	1959		Chapela	
Carlos E. Chardón	1897	1965	Chardón	
Vera Charles	1877	1954	Charles	
Stanisław Chełchowski	1866	1907		
François Fulgis Chevallier	1796	1840	Chevall.	
Margaret Church	1889	1976	Church	
Raffaele Ciferri	1897	1964	Cif.	
John Burton Cleland	1878	1971	Cleland	
Frederic Clements	1874	1945	Clem.	
George C. Clerk	1931	2019	Clerk	
George Perkins Clinton	1867	1937	G.P.Clinton	
Carolus Clusius	1526	1609	Clus.	
William Chambers Coker	1872	1953	Coker	
Norman Francis Conant	1908	1984	Conant	
Ovidiu Constantinescu	1933	2012	Constant.	
Orator F. Cook	1867	1949	O.F.Cook	
Mordecai Cubitt Cooke	1825	1914	Cooke	
William Bridge Cooke	1908	1991	W.B.Cooke	
August Carl Joseph Corda	1809	1849	Corda	
E. J. H. Corner	1906	1996	Corner	
Marie Maxime Cornu	1843	1901	Cornu	
Carl Correns	1864	1933	Correns	
Julien Noël Costantin	1857	1936	Costantin	
Arthur Disbrowe Cotton	1879	1962	Cotton	
Charles Crossland	1844	1916	Crossl.	
George Baker Cummins	1904	2007	Cummins	
G. H. Cunningham	1892	1962	G.Cunn.	
Frederick Currey	1819	1881	Curr.	
Kathleen Maisey Curtis	1892	1994	K.M.Curtis	
Moses Ashley Curtis	1808	1872	M.A.Curtis	
William Curtis	1746	1799	Curtis	
Giuseppe De Notaris	1805	1877	De Not.	
John Dearness	1852	1954	Dearn.	
Edouard Georges Delacroix	1858	1907	Delacr.	
William Clark Denison	1928	2005	Denison	
R. W. G. Dennis	1910	2003	Dennis	
Aurel Dermek	1925	1989	Dermek	
René Louiche Desfontaines	1750	1833	Desf.	
Dennis E. Desjardin	1950		Desjardin	
John Baptiste Henri Joseph Desmazières	1786	1862	Desm.	
James Dickson	1738	1822	Dicks.	
James G. Dickson	1891	1962	J.G.Dicks.	
William Webster Diehl	1891	1978	Diehl	
Johann Jacob Dillenius	1687	1747	Dill.	
Joan Dingley	1916	2008	Dingley	
Alden C. Dirks	1993		Dirks	
Bernard Ogilvie Dodge	1872	1960	B.O.Dodge	
Carroll William Dodge	1895	1988	C.W.Dodge	
Ethel Doidge	1887	1965	Doidge	
Marinus Anton Donk	1908	1972	Donk	
Charles Drechsler	1892	1986	Drechsler	
Edouard Drouhet	1919	2000	Drouhet	
Benjamin Minge Duggar	1872	1956	Duggar	
Barthélemy Charles Joseph Dumortier	1797	1878	Dumort.	
Catherine Gross Duncan	1908	1968		
Elias Judah Durand	1870	1922	E.J.Durand	
Michel Charles Durieu de Maisonneuve	1796	1878	Durieu	
Ondrej Ďuriška			Ďuriška	
Franklin Sumner Earle	1856	1929	Earle	
Finn-Egil Eckblad	1923	2000	Eckblad	
Claude Wilbur Edgerton	1880	1965	Edgerton	
Christian Gottfried Ehrenberg	1795	1876	Ehrenb.	
Jakob Friedrich Ehrhart	1742	1795	Ehrh.	
Job Bicknell Ellis	1829	1905	Ellis	
Ralph Emerson	1912	1979	R.Emers.	
Stephan Endlicher	1804	1849	Endl.	
George Engelmann	1809	1884	Engelm.	
Mary English	1919	2009	M.P.English	
Constantin von Ettingshausen	1826	1897	Ettingsh.	
Benjamin Matlack Everhart	1818	1904	Everh.	
William Leigh Williamson Eyre	1841	1914	Eyre	
Igor Fábry	1900	1982	Fábry	
Charles E. Fairman	1856	1934	Fairm.	
Richard Falck	1868	1955	Falck	
William Gilson Farlow	1844	1919	Farl.	
Olga Fassatiová	1924	2011	Fassat.	
Victor Fayod	1860	1900	Fayod	
John Fincham	1926	2005		
Walter Philip Kennedy Findlay	1904	1985		
Bruce Fink	1861	1927	Fink	
Eduard Fischer	1861	1939	E.Fisch.	
Harry Morton Fitzpatrick	1886	1949	Fitzp.	
Camille Flagey	1837	1898	Flagey	
Julius von Flotow	1788	1856	Flot.	
Ivan Focht	1927	1992		
Georg Forster	1754	1794	G.Forst.	
Lorraine Friedman	1919	2001	Friedman	
Elias Magnus Fries	1794	1878	Fr.	
Theodor Magnus Fries	1832	1913	Th.Fr.	
Charles Christopher Frost	1805	1880	Frost	
Bruce A. Fuhrer	1930	2023	Fuhrer	
Filip Fuljer			Fuljer	
Joseph Gaertner	1732	1791	Gaertn.	
Walter Gams	1934	2017	W.Gams	
Irma Gamundí	1927	2023	Gamundí	
Edward Garber	1918	2004		
Sigisfredo Garnica	1966		Garnica	
Guglielmo Gasparrini	1803	1866	Gasp.	
Charles Gaudichaud-Beaupré	1789	1854	Gaudich.	
Ernst Albert Gäumann	1893	1963	Gäum.	
Paul Gelting	1905	1964	Gelting	
Léon Gaston Genevier	1830	1880	Genev.	
William Ruggles Gerard	1841	1914	W.R.Gerard	
James Wessell Gerdemann	1921	2008	Gerd.	
Robert Lee Gilbertson	1925	2011	Gilb.	
Claude Casimir Gillet	1806	1896	Gillet	
Helen Margaret Gilkey	1886	1972	Gilkey	
Stanislav Glejdura			Glejdura	
Johann Friedrich Gmelin	1748	1804	J.F.Gmel.	
Nina Golubkova	1932	2009	N.S.Golubk.	
David Gottlieb	1911	1982		
Larry F. Grand	1940	2013	Grand	
Rev. Rayne Grant	1978		Grant	
Samuel Frederick Gray	1766	1828	Gray	
Pieter Groenhart	1894	1965	Groen.	
William Bywater Grove	1848	1938	Groves	
James Walton Groves	1906	1970	J.W.Groves	
David Gruby	1810	1898	Gruby	
Gro Gulden	1939		Gulden	
Johan Ernst Gunnerus	1718	1773	Gunnerus	
Anna Guttová	1972		Guttová	
Gastón Guzmán	1932	2016	Guzman	
Helen Gwynne-Vaughan	1879	1967	Gwynne-Vaughan	
Ladislav Hagara	1944		Hagara	
Byron Halsted	1852	1918	Halst.	
Emil Christian Hansen	1842	1909	E.C.Hansen	
Kanesuke Hara	1885	1962	Hara	
H. W. Harkness	1821	1901	Harkn.	
Robert Almer Harper	1862	1946		
Richard Clinton Harris	1939		R. C. Harris	
Kenneth A. Harrison	1901	1991	K.A.Harrison	
Reginald Haskins	1916	1999	Haskins	
David Leslie Hawksworth	1946		D.Hawksw.	
Elizabeth Lee Hazen	1885	1975		
Harri Harmaja	1944		Harmaja	
Frigyes Ákos Hazslinszky	1818	1896	Hazsl.	
Roger Heim	1900	1979	R.Heim	
Paul Heinemann	1916	1996	Heinem.	
Paul Christoph Hennings	1841	1908	Henn.	
Aino Henssen	1925	2011	Henssen	
Josef Herink	1915	1993	Herink	
Teófilo Herrera Suárez	1924	2020	Herrera	
Lexemuel Ray Hesler	1888	1977	Hesler	
David Hibbett			Hibbett	
Hermann Hoffmann	1819	1891	H.Hoffm.	
Franz Xaver Rudolf von Höhnel	1852	1920	Höhn.	
Johan Theodor Holmskjold	1731	1793	Holmsk.	
Edward Willet Dorland Holway	1853	1923	Holw.	
Natsurang Homchantara	1957	2006		
Edwin Earle Honey	1891	1956	Honey	
Tsuguo Hongo	1923	2007	Hongo	
Joseph Dalton Hooker	1817	1911	Hook.f.	
Egon Horak	1937		Horak	
John W. Hotson	1870	1957	Hotson	
Frank Leslie Howard	1903	1997		
Huang Nianlai	1939	2022		
Christina M. Hull	1970			
Anna Maria Hussey	1805	1853	Hussey	
Sanshi Imai	1900	1970	S.Imai	
Emil J. Imbach	1897	1970	Imbach	
Giuseppe Inzenga	1815	1887	Inzenga	
Henry Alexander Carmichael Jackson	1877	1961	H.A.C.Jacks.	
Nikolaus Joseph von Jacquin	1727	1817	Jacq.	
Soňa Jančovičová			Jančovič.	
Lukáš Janošík			Janošík	
Anna Eliza Jenkins	1886	1973	Jenkins	
Abraham Z. Joffe	1909	2000	Joffe	
George Thomas Johnson	1916	1981		
Marcel Josserand	1900	1992	Joss.	
Ari Jumpponen	1957		Jumpponen	
Károly Kalchbrenner	1807	1886	Kalchbr.	
Julius Kane	1925	2001	J.Kane	
Gustav Karl Wilhelm Hermann Karsten	1817	1908	H.Karst.	
Petter Adolf Karsten	1834	1917	P.Karst	
Calvin Henry Kauffman	1869	1931	Kauffman	
Václav Kautman			Kautman	
Ivona Kautmanová			Kautman.	
William Ashbrook Kellerman	1850	1908	Kellerm.	
Bryce Kendrick	1933		W.B.Kendr.	
Frank Dunn Kern	1883	1973	F.Kern	
Wilhelm Kirschstein	1863	1946	Kirschst.	
Dimitrios Kontoyiannis	1963		D.P. Kontoyiannis	
Heinrich Klebahn	1859	1942	Kleb.	
Albert Klöcker	1862	1923	Klöcker	
František Kotlaba	1927	2020	Kotl.	
Hanns Kreisel	1931	2017	Kreisel	
Louis Charles Christopher Krieger	1873	1940	L.Krieg.	
German Joseph Krieglsteiner	1937	2001	Krieglst.	
Julius Vincenz von Krombholz	1782	1843	Krombh.	
Viktor Kučera			V.Kučera	
Julius Kühn	1825	1910	J.G.Kühn	
Robert Kühner	1903	1996	Kühner	
Paul Kummer	1834	1912	P.Kumm.	
Vladimír Kunca			V.Kunca	
Otto Kuntze	1843	1907	Kuntze	
Syo Kurokawa	1926	2010	Kurok.	
Cletus P. Kurtzman	1938	2017	Kurtzman	
Roman Labuda			Labuda	
Anna Lackovičová			Lackovičová	
Jakob Emanuel Lange	1864	1941	J.E.Lange	
Morten Lange	1919	2003	M.Lange	
Michael J. Larsen	1938	2000	M.J.Larsen	
Jack Laundon	1934	2016	Laundon	
Jacques Désiré Leandri	1903	1982	Leandri	
Paul Arenz Lemke	1937	1995	P.A.Lemke	
Elmar Leppik	1898	1978	Leppik	
Jens Lind	1874	1939	Lind	
Gustav Lindau	1866	1923	Lindau	
David Hunt Linder	1899	1946	Linder	
Paul Lindner	1861	1945		
Johann Heinrich Friedrich Link	1767	1850	Link	
Carl Linnaeus	1707	1778	L.	
Eva Lisická			Lisická	
Pavel Lizoň	1945		Lizoň	
Lois Long (mycologist)	1918	2005		
William Henry Long	1867	1947	Long	
Josiah Lincoln Lowe	1905	1997	J.Lowe	
Rudolph Arnold Maas Geesteranus	1911	2003	Maas Geest.	
Thomas Huston Macbride	1848	1934	T.Macbr.	
John Macoun	1831	1920	Macoun	
Edwin Butterworth Mains	1890	1968	Mains	
René Maire	1878	1949	Maire	
Nestor Léon Marchand	1833	1911	Marchand	
George Willard Martin	1886	1971	G.W.Martin	
Maria Paz Martin Esteban	1960		MPMartin	
Carl Friedrich Philipp von Martius	1794	1868	Mart.	
Ludmila Marvanová	1932		Marvanová	
Edmund William Mason	1890	1975	E.W.Mason	
Caro Benigno Massalongo	1852	1928	C. Massal.	
George Edward Massee	1850	1917	Massee	
Louis Matruchot	1863	1921	Matr.	
Tom May			T.W.May	
Charles McIlvaine	1840	1909	McIlv.	
Robert Francis Ross McNabb	1934	1972	McNabb	
Konstantin Mereschkowski	1855	1921	Mereschk.	
Georg Friedrich Wilhelm Meyer	1782	1856	G.Mey	
Julian Howell Miller	1890	1961	J.H.Mill.	
Orson K. Miller, Jr.	1930	2006	O.K.Mill.	
Kingo Miyabe	1860	1951	Miyabe	
Camille Montagne	1784	1866	Mont.	
Royall T. Moore	1930	2014	R.T.Moore	
Jiří Moravec	1943		J.Moravec	
Pierre Marie Arthur Morelet	1809	1892		
Andrew Price Morgan	1836	1907	Morgan	
Meinhard Michael Moser	1924	2002	M.M.Moser	
Józef Motyka	1900	1984	Motyka	
Ferdinand von Mueller	1825	1896	F.Muell.	
Emil Müller	1920	2008	E.Müll.	
William Murrill	1869	1957	Murrill	
Carl Nägeli	1817	1891	Nägeli	
John Axel Nannfeldt	1904	1985	Nannf.	
James Needham	1846	1913		
Christian Gottfried Daniel Nees von Esenbeck	1776	1858	Nees	
Walther Neuhoff	1891	1971	Neuhoff	
Frank Newhook	1918	1999		
Gustav Niessl von Mayendorf	1839	1919	Niessl	
Mildred K. Nobles	1903	1993	Nobles	
Machiel Noordeloos	1949		Noordel.	
William Nowell	1880	1968	Nowell	
William Nylander	1822	1899	Nyl.	
Franz Oberwinkler	1939	2018	Oberw.	
Robert T. Orr	1908	1994		
P. D. Orton	1916	2005	P.D.Orton	
Casper van Overeem	1893	1927	Overeem	
Lee Oras Overholts	1890	1946	Overh.	
Alfred Oxner	1898	1973	Oxner	
Charles S. Parker	1882	1950	C.S.Parker	
Frederick Parker-Rhodes	1914	1987	Park.-Rhodes	
Erast Parmasto	1928	2012	Parmasto	
Flora Wambaugh Patterson	1847	1928	F.Patt.	
Jean-Jacques Paulet	1740	1826	Paulet	
Arthur Anselm Pearson	1874	1954	A.Pearson	
Charles Horton Peck	1833	1917	Peck	
Maroš Peiger			Peiger	
Christiaan Hendrik Persoon	1761	1836	Pers.	
Tom Petch	1870	1948	Petch	
Ron Petersen	1934		R.H.Petersen	
Adrianuc Pijper	1886	1964	Pijper	
Albert Pilát	1903	1974	Pilát	
Ivan Pišút	1935	2017	Pišút	
John I. Pitt			Pitt	
Charles Bagge Plowright	1849	1910	Plowr.	
Eduard Friedrich Poeppig	1791	1868	Poepp.	
Illtyd Buller Pole-Evans	1879	1968	Pole-Evans	
Adam Polhorský			Polhorský	
Flora G. Pollack	1919	1997	Pollack	
Steven Hayden Pollock	1947	1981	S.H.Pollock	
Patricio Ponce de León	1919	2010	P.Ponce de León	
Beatrix Potter	1866	1943		
Zdeněk Pouzar	1932		Pouzar	
Karel Presl	1794	1852	C.Presl.	
Nathanael Pringsheim	1823	1894	Pringsh.	
Edwin John Quekett	1808	1847	E.J.Quekett	
Lucien Quélet	1832	1899	Quél.	
Gottlob Ludwig Rabenhorst	1806	1881	Rabenh.	
Constantine Samuel Rafinesque	1783	1840	Raf.	
Jörg H. Raithelhuber	1931		Raithelh.	
Mario Rajchenberg	1954		Rajchenb.	
John Ramsbottom	1885	1974	Ramsb.	
Robert Delafield Rands	1890	1970	Rands	
Kenneth B. Raper	1908	1987	Raper	
Carleton Rea	1861	1946	Rea	
Maximilian Friedrich Timotheus Ferdinand Maria Reess	1845	1901	Reess	
Heinrich Rehm	1828	1916	Rehm	
Ludwig Reichenbach	1793	1879	Rchb.	
Derek Reid	1927	2006	D.A.Reid	
Johannes Rick	1869	1946	Rick	
Adalbert Ricken	1851	1921	Ricken	
Henry Nicholas Ridley	1855	1956	Ridl.	
Harald Udo von Riedl	1936		Riedl	
Soňa Ripková			Ripková	
Clark Thomas Rogerson	1918	2001	Rogerson	
Léon Louis Rolland	1841	1912	Rolland	
Henri Romagnesi	1912	1999	Romagn.	
Emil Rostrup	1831	1907	Rostr.	
Georg Eberhard Rumphius	1628	1702	Rumph.	
Raymond Sabouraud	1864	1938	Sabour.	
Pier Andrea Saccardo	1845	1920	Sacc.	
Augustin Saint-Hilaire	1799	1853	A.St.-Hil.	
Robert Archibald Samson	1946		Samson	
Vsevolod Savicz	1885	1972	Savicz	
Douglas Barton Osborne Savile	1919	2000	Savile	
Jacob Christian Schäffer	1718	1790	Schaeff.	
Julius Schäffer	1882	1944	Jul.Schäff.	
Edwin Schild-Zamuner	1927	2014	Schild	
Diederich Franz Leonhard von Schlechtendal	1794	1866	Schltdl.	
Johann Carl Schmidt	1793	1850	J.C.Schmidt	
Franz von Paula Schrank	1747	1835	Schrank	
Joseph Schröter	1837	1894	J.Schröt.	
Stephan Schulzer von Müggenburg	1802	1892	Schulzer	
Marie Beatrice Schol-Schwarz	1898	1969	M.B.Schwarz	
Lewis David de Schweinitz	1780	1834	Schwein.	
Giovanni Antonio Scopoli	1723	1788	Scop.	
Fred Jay Seaver	1877	1970	Seaver	
Louis Secretan	1758	1839	Secr.	
Steven Selva	1948		Selva	
Arthur Bliss Seymour	1859	1933	Seym.	
Leland Shanor	1914	1993	Shanor	
Cornelius Lott Shear	1865	1956	Shear	
Merlin Sheldrake			Sheldrake	
John Sibthorp	1758	1796	Sibth.	
Margarita Silva-Hutner	1915	2002		
Rolf Singer	1906	1994	Singer	
Pavol Škubla	1946		Škubla	
Marek Slovák			Slovák	
Alexander H. Smith	1904	1986	A.H.Sm.	
Annie Lorrain Smith	1854	1937	A.L.Sm.	
George Smith	1895	1967	G.Sm.	
James Edward Smith	1759	1828	Sm.	
Worthington George Smith	1835	1917	W.G.Sm.	
Miroslav Smotlacha	1920	2007	Smotl.	
Walter Henry Snell	1889	1980	Snell	
Olav Johan Sopp	1860	1931	Sopp	
Henry Thomas Soppitt	1858	1899		
James Sowerby	1757	1822	Sowerby	
Frederick Kroeber Sparrow	1903	1977	F.K.Sparrow	
Carlos Luigi Spegazzini	1858	1926	Speg.	
Kurt Polycarp Joachim Sprengel	1766	1833	Spreng.	
Elvin C. Stakman	1885	1979	Stakman.	
Paul Stamets	1955		Stamets	
Frank Lincoln Stevens	1871	1934	F.Stevens	
Neil Everett Stevens	1887	1949	N.E.Stevens	
Greta Stevenson	1911	1990	G.Stev.	
John Albert Stevenson	1890	1979	J.A.Stev.	
Daniel Elliot Stuntz	1909	1983	D.E.Stuntz	
William Codman Sturgis	1862	1942	Sturgis	
Richard C. Summerbell	1956		Summerb.	
David Ross Sumstine	1870	1965	Sumst.	
Mirko Svrček	1925	2017	Svrček	
Hans Sydow	1879	1946	Syd.	
Paul Sydow	1851	1925	P.Syd.	
Dana Szabóová			Szabóová	
John W. Taylor	1950		J.W.Taylor	
Marie Taylor	1930	1999	G.M.Taylor	
Leo Roy Tehon	1895	1954	Tehon	
Roland Thaxter	1858	1932	Thaxt.	
Harry D. Thiers	1919	2000	Thiers	
M. J. Thirumalachar	1914	1999	Thirum.	
Charles Thom	1872	1956	Thom	
Carl Peter Thunberg	1743	1828	Thunb.	
Lois H. Tiffany	1924	2009	L.H.Tiffany	
Mikhail Piatrovich Tomin	1883	1967	Tomin	
Pavol Tomka	1968		Tomka	
John Torrey	1796	1873	Torr.	
Joseph Pitton de Tournefort	1656	1708	Tourn.	
Vladimir Andreevich Tranzschel	1868	1942	Tranzschel	
James Trappe	1931		Trappe	
Giovanni Battista Traverso	1878	1959	Traverso	
Edward Tuckerman	1817	1886	Tuck.	
Charles Tulasne	1816	1884	C.Tul.	
Louis René 'Edmond' Tulasne	1815	1885	Tul.	
Jessie Uehling	1986			
Oskar Eberhard Ulbrich	1857	1952	Ulbr.	
Lucien Marcus Underwood	1853	1907	Underw.	
Mall Vaasma	1945	2009		
Martin Vahl	1749	1804	Vahl.	
Sébastien Vaillant	1669	1722	Vaill.	
Edvard August Vainio	1853	1929	Vainio	
Kálmán Vánky	1930		Vánky	
Philippe Édouard Léon Van Tieghem	1839	1914	Tiegh.	
Josef Velenovský	1858	1949	Velen.	
Antonín Vězda	1920	2008	Vězda	
Rytas Vilgalys	1958		Vilgalys	
Jean Paul Vuillemin	1861	1932	Vuill.	
Göran Wahlenberg	1780	1851	Wahlenb.	
Elsie Maud Wakefield	1886	1972	Wakef.	
Nathaniel Wallich	1786	1854	Wall.	
Harry Marshall Ward	1854	1906	H.M.Ward	
Eugenius Warming	1841	1924	Warm.	
R. Gordon Wasson	1898	1986		
Roy Watling	1938		Watling	
George F. Weber	1894	1976		
John Webster	1925	2014	J.Webster	
Lewis Edgar Wehmeyer	1897	1971	Wehm.	
Christian Ehrenfried Weigel	1748	1831	Weigel	
Johann Anton Weinmann	1782	1858	Weinm.	
Friedrich Welwitsch	1806	1872	Welw.	
Gretna Margaret Weste	1917	2006	Weste	
Johanna Westerdijk	1883	1961	Westerd.	
William H. Weston, Jr.	1890	1978	W.Weston	
Herbert Hice Whetzel	1877	1944	Whetzel	
Howard C. Whisler	1931	2007	Whisler	
William Lawrence White	1908	1952	W.L.White	
Carl Ludwig Willdenow	1765	1812	Willd.	
William Withering	1741	1799	With.	
Frederick Adolph Wolf	1885	1975	F.A.Wolf	
Alec Wood	1933	2016	A.E.Wood	
John Medley Wood	1827	1915	J.M.Wood	
Jorge Eduardo Wright	1922	2005	J.E.Wright	
Franz Xavier von Wulfen	1728	1805	Wulfen	
Cecil Edmund Yarwood	1907	1981		
Anthony M. Young	1943		A.M.Young	
Wanda Zabłocka	1900	1978		
Alexander Zahlbruckner	1860	1939	Zahlbr.	
Milan Zajac			Zajac	
Mu Zang	1930	2011	M.Zang	
Sanford Myron Zeller	1885	1948	Zeller	
Wenying Zhuang	1948		W.Y.Zhuang	
Friedrich Wilhelm Zopf	1846	1909	Zopf	
George Lorenzo Zundel	1885	1950	Zundel	
Jochen Gartz	1953	2020		
Bryn Dentinger	1978			
Colin Domnauer				
