= Lorraine Friedman =

American medical mycologist

- Born: Lorraine Friedman; January 1, 1919; Dawson, New Mexico
- Died: February 12, 2001 (age 82); Osyka, Mississippi
- Education: University of Arkansas University of North Carolina Chapel Hill Duke University
- Occupation: Medical Mycologist
- Years active: 1951-1981
- Known for: Tulane University Medical Mycology Program
- Notable work: Ringworm of the hair

Lorraine Friedman (January 1, 1919, Dawson, New Mexico – February 12, 2001, Osyka, Mississippi) was an American medical mycologist who was recruited to Tulane University (New Orleans, Louisiana) to create a center for medical mycology. She was a faculty member at Tulane University from 1955-1981 where she extensively researched Tinea capitis, “Ringworm of the hair.” She was instrumental in creating the Medical Mycological Society of the Americas and served as the President in 1975.

== Early life ==
Lorraine Friedman was born on January 1, 1919, in Dawson, New Mexico. Shortly after she was born, her parents, Mathe Friedman and Alice Friedman moved their family back to Hot Springs, Arkansas, where they were originally from.

Lorraine Friedman received her Bachelor of Arts from The University of Arkansas in June 1940. In 1942, after graduating from the University of Arkansas, she completed a medical technology training at Menorah Hospital in Kansas City, Missouri. She enlisted on December 14, 1942, to the United States Navy’s Medical Services Corps as a medical laboratory officer until 1946. Before obtaining a master’s in public health from the University of North Carolina Chapel Hill in 1948, she worked for one year as a diagnostic bacteriologist at Johns Hopkins Hospital. Finally, she was advised by Norman Conant, PhD, at Duke University and received her PhD in 1951. Her thesis work was titled “Comparative antigenic and immunologic studies on blastomyces dermatitidis, the cause of North American blastomycosis, and blastomyces brasiliensis, the cause of South American blastomycosis.” A portion of her research, "Immunological studies on the etiologic agents of North and South American blastomycosis" was published in 1953 in Mycopathologia.

== Career ==
After graduating from Duke University, she accepted a position at the University of California Berkeley in the School of Public Health as the Chief of the Mycology Division of the Naval Biological Laboratory. She spent four years working with Charles E. Smith, PhD, the known expert on Coccidioidomycosis. She worked on Coccidioides immitis, a fungal pathogen responsible for causing Valley Fever in the southwest United States. One prominent article she wrote on the work she conducted at UC Berkeley was titled “Studies on Coccidioides immitis: Morphology and sporulation capacity of forty-seven strains.”

She was later recruited in 1955 to Tulane University Medical School to open a medical mycology center. She opened a medical mycology program in 1957 after receiving a National Institute of Health grant to fund her program. Most notably, this was only the third such grant to be awarded at this time. This grant was renewed annually for the 24 years she worked at Tulane University. Friedman designed her program and curriculum to allow students to create vital relationships between the graduate school and the medical school. One prominent class first-year PhD students were required to take was her medical mycology course. This course required students to rotate between diagnostic and/or clinical labs and to conduct their individual research for a year.

As her career at Tulane University went on, most of her time was spent on mentoring students and less on conducting research; however, some of her most notable research was on Tinea capitis, Ringworm of the scalp. Her research lab was foundational to the early understanding of this dermatological fungal infection. During her years as a PhD student, the demand for medical mycology was high. In the late 40s and early 50s, not much was known about many fungal diseases, therefore, mortality rates for invasive diseases were 50-100%. Therefore, Friedman, along with her collogues, were instrumental in our modern day understanding of several fungal diseases, some of which are easily treated with modern medicine.

== Mentorship ==
While she was at Tulane University, she advised 10 PhD students and 4 master's students. These students were amongst the first generation of students to be trained with molecular-based techniques. Through her success of mentoring, many of Friedman's students went on to be prominent medical mycologists themselves, such as George Kobayashi, William Cooper, Geoffrey Land, and Thomas G. Mitchell. Judith Domer, a lifelong colleague of Friedman, said that her military training led to a mentoring style that was sometimes tough on students. However, this style proved effective since she successfully mentored a number of highly successful students.

=== Medical Mycological Society of America ===
On November 6, 1961, Lorraine Friedman and Donald Schneidau contacted the president of the American Society of Microbiology (ASM), John E. Blair proposing that a subdivision within the society be created for medical mycology which was gaining momentum at this time. In 1965, a committee composed of Lorraine Friedman, Libero Ajello, Charlotte Champbell, Milton Huppert, Hillel Levine, and Margarita Silva-Hutner met during the Second Coccidioidomycosis Symposium to organize a new Medical Mycology Division. The division opened in 1968 with Libero Ajello, PhD serving as the first president. Lorraine Friedman served as President in 1975. Several of her graduate students served as future presidents. The division is still active today.

== Accomplishments and awards ==
- 1948 Kellogg Foundation Award recipient
- 1958- First recipient of the NIH mycology training grant with Morris F. Shaffer
- 1962 Described the perfect state of Microsporum vanbrueuseghemii, fungal pathogen that causes Ringworm
- 1963-1964 Chairman of the Mycology Division of American Society for Microbiology
- 1964-1965 President of the Medical Mycological Society of the Americas (ASM)
- 1964 Recipient of the Rockefeller Foundation Fellowship to work in Uganda
- 1966-1971 served on the editorial boards for the Journal of Bacteriology
- 1970-1974 served on the board for Infection and Immunity
- 1983 Started a 5 year term on the NIH Training Grant Committee within the National Institute of Allergy and Infectious Diseases (NIAID) and later the Bacteriology and Mycology diseases
- First woman appointed to the NIAID
- 1993 Alice C. Evans Award, named after the first female president of the American Society of Microbiology in 1928

== See also ==
- BJ Hogg (30 October 2013). "Dr Lorraine Lillian Friedman". Find A Grave.
