= Wessell =

Wessell is a given name and a surname. Notable people with the name include:

- Wessell Anderson (born 1966), American jazz alto and sopranino saxophonist
- James Wessell Gerdemann (1921–2008), American mycologist
- Nils Yngve Wessell (1914–2007), American psychologist, president of Tufts University
- Shaun Wessell (born 1981), Australian former rugby league footballer
- Zam Wessell (Star Wars character), a Clawdite bounty hunter

== See also ==
- Wessel (disambiguation)
- Wessells (surname)
