= Kontoyiannis =

Kontoyiannis (Greek: Κοντογιάννης) is a Greek surname. Notable people with the surname include:

- Constantine Contogenis (born 1949, family name Kontoyiannis), Greek-American poet
- Dimitrios Kontoyiannis (born 1963), Greek–American physician
- Ioannis Kontoyiannis (born 1972), Greek mathematician and information theorist
