= Leucocoprinus muticolor =

Scientific classification
- Kingdom: Fungi
- Division: Basidiomycota
- Class: Agaricomycetes
- Order: Agaricales
- Family: Agaricaceae
- Genus: Leucocoprinus
- Species: L. muticolor

Binomial name
- Leucocoprinus muticolor (Murrill) Aberdeen (1992)

Synonyms
- Lepiota muticolor Murrill (1914)

Species of fungus

Leucocoprinus muticolor
- Mycological characteristics
- Gills on hymenium
- Cap is convex or campanulate
- Hymenium is free
- Stipe has a ring
- Spore print is white to cream
- Ecology is saprotrophic
- Edibility is unknown

Leucocoprinus muticolor is a species of mushroom producing fungus in the family Agaricaceae.

== Taxonomy ==
It was first described in 1914 by the American mycologist William Murrill who classified it as Lepiota muticolor.

In 1992 it was reclassified as Leucocoprinus muticolor by the mycologist John Errol Chandos Aberdeen based on observations in Australia which were compared to specimens described by the British mycologist Richard William George Dennis in 1953.

The name Agaricus (Lepiota) muticolor was also used by Miles Joseph Berkeley and Christopher Edmund Broome in 1871 for an unrelated species.

== Description ==
Leucocoprinus muticolor is a small dapperling mushroom.

Murrill described the specimens from Alabama, USA as follows.

Cap: 2.5-4cm wide with a white, campanulate (bell shaped) expanding cap which has a distinct dark brown umbo. It is covered in small brown fibrillose scales, the cap edges have slight striations and the white surface discolours to a rosy whitish when dry. Gills: Free, crowded, swollen in the middle (ventricose) and white discolouring to orange or browny yellow when dry. Stem: 3-5cm long and around 3mm thick with a slightly bulbous base. It is tough, smooth and white but discolors to a reddish-umber colour when dry. The stem ring is located in the middle of the stem (median) and is fixed in place, it is white with brown edges but may sometimes disappears. Spores: Ellipsoid. 8-9 x 6-7 μm.

Aberdeen's description of the specimens from Queensland, Australia differs in some regards.

Cap: 4cm wide, shallow convex with a greyish central disc instead of an umbo. The rest of the cap surface is whitish and covered in dark cream coloured fibrils (thread like filaments). When dry the cap discolours brownish and the scales become detachable. Gills: Not recorded when fresh. Dark brown when dry. Stem: 7.6 cm long and 5mm thick tapering upwards from the bulbous 8mm thick base. It is hollow and white but also dries to brown. The fragile stem ring is located a third of the way down from the top (apical). Spore print: Whitish with a pink tint. Spores: Elliptical with a pore. Dextrinoid. 9–13.5 x 5.5-7 μm.

== Habitat and distribution ==
L. muticolor is scarcely recorded and little known. The specimens studied by Murrill were growing gregariously and collected by F.S. Earle from a hickory log in swampland near Auburn, Alabama in September 1899. It was only known from this location. The specimens studied by Aberdeen were collected by A.B. Cribb in February 1962 and January 1963 in Lamington National Park, Queensland, Australia.

The Queensland Department of Environment and Science holds a small number of preserved specimens of L. muticolor mostly from the 1960s. These were collected in rainforest habitats in the state of Queensland.
