= Seymour Hutner =

American microbiologist (1911–2003)

Seymour Herbert Hutner (1911–2003) was a microbiologist specializing in the nutritional biochemistry of protists (protozoa and algae).

== Early life and education ==
Born in Brooklyn, New York in 1911, he obtained a bachelor's degree from the City College of New York (CCNY) in 1931 and a Ph.D. at Cornell University in 1937, where he worked with the Nobel laureate James B. Sumner.

In 1936 he published a paper showing that the photosynthetic flagellate Euglena had a nutritional requirement for a substance extracted from animal tissue. At that time this was considered to be improbable and the paper was rejected by several American journals before eventually being published in Europe. Years later it was discovered that the required factor was vitamin B12, or cyanocobalamin. He developed a nutritional assay method for vitamin B12 using Euglena that was used for many years in hospitals to test for B12 levels in blood, eventually being replaced by other methods.

== Career ==
=== Haskins Laboratories ===
After graduating from Cornell, he joined an independent research laboratory, the Haskins Laboratories founded by the physicist Franklin Cooper and the entomologist and geneticist Caryl Haskins. Initially this was based in Massachusetts, near M.I.T., but then it moved to a building on East 43rd Street in New York City, where Hutner was joined by a newly arrived Italian scientist, Luigi Provasoli, who had spent time in the laboratory of Andre Lwoff in Paris. In New York, during the 1940s through the 1960s, Haskins Labs became known for studies of protistan nutrition and the development of culture media and culture assay methods. Hutner was one of the first to appreciate the importance of organic complexing agents in trace metal nutrition of cells. This had significant implications for the development of culture media and also in the understanding of microbial ecology. With his colleague Luigi Provasoli he showed that photosynthetic organisms could be ‘bleached’ by the antibiotic streptomycin – an early clue of the endosymbiotic hypothesis about the origin of chloroplasts from a prokaryotic ancestor.

At 43rd St., Hutner became known for nurturing young students at a time when this was not a typical pattern, and the lab served as an incubator for many talented high school and undergraduate students. Some went on to become productive scientists, including the two Nobel laureates, Joshua Lederberg and David Baltimore. While full-time at the lab, Hutner also spent several years on the faculties of Columbia University and Fordham University in this period. He also edited, with Lwoff (and later in a second edition with Michael Levandowsky), a multivolume compendium, the Biochemistry and Physiology of Protozoa, that was for many years a standard reference.

=== Relocation to Pace University ===
In 1970 the lab was required to leave its quarters at 43rd St. Cooper and Provasoli went to Yale University in New Haven, Connecticut, but Hutner preferred to remain in New York and moved his part of the lab to Pace University in Lower Manhattan, where he became a professor.

In New York, Hutner's component, focused on microbiological research, became a department of Pace University and is also named Haskins Laboratories, but the two identically named laboratories no longer have formal ties. At Pace the lab became a center for metabolic studies of protistan parasites, as well as studies of behavioral ecology and sensory physiology of free-living protists. Under the leadership of Hutner's student, Cyrus Bacchi, the former led to development of the antiparasitic drug eflornithine (alpha-difluoromethylornithine), widely used today against African sleeping sickness (trypanosomiasis). Work on antiparasitic drugs continues today under the direction of Nigel Yarlett.

== Legacy and death ==
Hutner was a founding member of the Society of Protozoologists (now the International Society of Protistologists) serving as its president in 1961-2, and was for many years on the editorial board of the Journal of Protozoology (now the Journal of Eukaryotic Microbiology). A 1977 issue of the journal was dedicated to him. He died in 2003 after a long illness; an obituary was published in the Journal of Eukaryotic Microbiology.

== Personal life ==
In 1956, he married the medical mycologist Margarita Silva.
