= Ablakatov =

Ablakatov (Russian: Аблака́тов; masculine) or Ablakatova (Аблака́това; feminine) is a Russian last name, a variant of which is Oblakatov (Облака́тов; masculine) or Oblakatova (Облака́това; feminine).

It derives from a patronymic which itself is derived from the occupational nickname "аблакат" (ablakat) or "облакат" (oblakat). The nickname is a corruption of the word "адвокат" (advokat), meaning defense lawyer.

People with the last name

- Alexandra Ablakatova, Russian mycologist
