= David Ross Sumstine =

U.S. educator and mycologist

- Born: January 21, 1870; Somerset, Pennsylvania, U.S.
- Died: April 17, 1965 (aged 95)
- Education: Gettysburg College
- Scientific career
- Fields: teaching; mycology
- Author abbrev. (botany): Sumst.

David Ross Sumstine (January 21, 1870 – April 17, 1965) was an American educator and mycologist.

== Life and career ==
Born in Somerset, Pennsylvania, Sumstine received a Bachelor of Arts degree in 1890 from Thiel College, in Greenville, Pennsylvania. He would receive an honorary Doctor of Pedagogy degree from this institution 41 years later in 1931. The University of Pittsburgh awarded him a Master of Science degree in 1908, and Gettysburg College a Doctor of Science degree in 1910. He became an ordained Lutheran minister in 1900 after having attended seminaries in Chicago and Pittsburgh.

In 1891, Sumstine started his teaching career in a one-room school at Youngstown, Pennsylvania. He later became principals of various schools in the area. After moving to Pittsburgh in 1908 and serving as the director of the Osceola branch of Central High School, he became the principal of Peabody High School in 1911, a position he held until 1926. After this, he was employed as director of Pittsburgh's public school's Department of Curriculum Study and Research until his retirement in 1939.

Sumstine married Estella McDowell when he was a young man. Two boys were produced from the marriage, but both died in childbirth, and Estella died in the early 1920s. He married Grace Donges in 1928; she died in 1957.

== Mycological research ==
Although primarily an educator, Sumstine's hobby was mycology. He started collecting, documenting, and classifying specimens as early as 1900; many of these early collections formed the basis of the mycological herbarium at the Carnegie Museum of Natural History. Most of his collections were made in Pennsylvania and in bordering states; in total, he collected more than 10,000 specimens. Sumstine had a special interest in the Hyphomycetes, a grouping of fungi in which he described 18 species new to science. He also studied plant diseases and fleshy fungi. In 1981, his collections were transferred to the New York Botanical Garden. In honor of his contributions to Carnegie Museum, he was named Honorary Curator of fungi in 1950. Sumstine was a charter member of the Mycological Society of America, and a fellow of the American Association for the Advancement of Science.

== Eponymy ==
Several species of fungi have been named after Sumstine:

- Grifola sumstinei Murrill 1904
- Lactarius sumstinei Peck 1905
- Rhinotrichum sumstinei Peck 1907
- Poria sumstinei Seaver 1934
- Psathyrella sumstinei A.H.Sm. 1972

== Selected publications ==
- Sumstine, D.R. (1910). "The North American Mucorales I". Mycologia. 2 (3): 125–154. doi:10.2307/3753621. JSTOR 3753621.
- Sumstine, D.R. (1911). "Studies in North American Hyphomycetes – I". Mycologia. 3 (2): 45–56. doi:10.2307/3753557. JSTOR 3753557.
- Sumstine, D.R. (1913). "Studies in North American Hyphomycetes – II". Mycologia. 5 (2): 45–61. doi:10.2307/3753563. JSTOR 3753563.
- Sumstine, D.R. (1914). "New or interesting fungi". Mycologia. 6 (1): 32–36. doi:10.2307/3753553. JSTOR 3753553.
- Sumstine, D.R. (1916). "A new species of Colus from Pennsylvania". Mycologia. 8 (3): 183–184. doi:10.1080/00275514.1916.12018877. JSTOR 3753202.
- Sumstine, D.R. (1949). "The Albert Commons collection of fungi in the herbarium of the Academy of Natural Sciences in Philadelphia". Mycologia. 41 (1): 11–23. doi:10.2307/3755268. JSTOR 3755268.
- Sumstine, D.R. (1918). "Fungi of Chautauqua County, New York". New York State Museum Bulletin. 197: 111–118.
- Sumstine, D.R.; Henry, L.K. (1955). "The Albert Commons collection of fungi in the herbarium of the Academy of Natural Sciences in Philadelphia, part II". Lloydia. 18 (4): 182–192.

== See also ==
- List of mycologists
