= Claude Wilbur Edgerton =

American mycologist (1880–1965)

Claude Wilbur Edgerton (9 March 1880–April 6, 1965) was an American mycologist. He was born in Woodbine, Iowa, and earned a Bachelor of Science degree from the University of Nebraska in 1903, and a PhD from Cornell University in 1908. After this he was employed at Louisiana State University, initially as a plant pathologist in the Agricultural Research Station, and later as Professor and then Head of Botany, Bacteriology, and Plant Pathology in 1924. Edgerton had this position until his retirement in 1950. He was known for his study of sugarcane diseases; his teaching materials formed the basis of the book Sugarcane and Its Diseases, first published in 1955 after his retirement. Species named in honor of Edgerton include Cryptosporiopsis edgertonii and Synchytrium edgertonii.

== Selected publications ==
- Atkinson, GF; Edgerton, CW (1907). "Protocoronospora, a new genus of fungi (preliminary note)". Journal of Mycology. 13 (5): 185–186. doi:10.2307/3752585. JSTOR 3752585.
- Edgerton, CW (1908). "Two little known Myxosporiums". Annales Mycologici. 6: 48–53.
- Edgerton, CW (1909). "The perfect state of the cotton anthracnose". Mycologia. 1 (3): 115–120. doi:10.2307/3753047. JSTOR 3753047.
- Edgerton, CW (1911). "Two new fig diseases". Phytopathology. 1: 12–17.
- Edgerton, CW (1919). "A new Balansia on Cyperus". Mycologia. 11 (5): 259–261. doi:10.2307/3753370. JSTOR 3753370.

== See also ==
- List of mycologists
