= William Codman Sturgis =

American mycologist

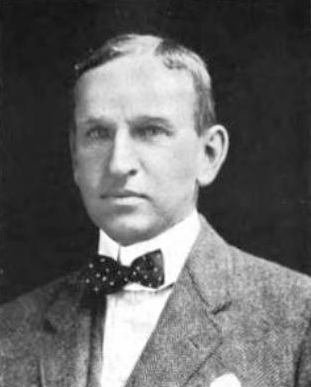
- Born: November 15, 1862; Boston, Massachusetts, US
- Died: September 29, 1942 (aged 79); New York, New York, US
- Education: Harvard University
- Occupation: Mycologist
- Spouse: Carolyn Scofield (m. 1889)
- Children: 4

William Codman Sturgis (November 15, 1862 – September 29, 1942) was an American mycologist.

== Biography ==
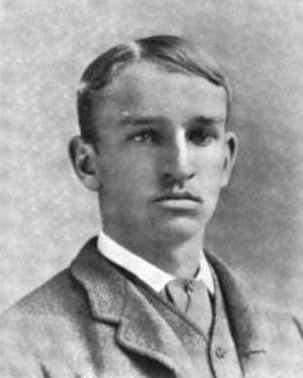
As a Harvard undergraduate

Born in Boston, Massachusetts, he was the son of Russell Sturgis (1831-1899) and his first wife Susan Codman Welles, the younger brother of the architect R. Clipston Sturgis, the nephew of the architect John Hubbard Sturgis, and the grandson of the China Merchant Russell Sturgis (1805-1887) and his second wife Mary Hubbard Sturgis. Sturgis studied at Harvard University, where he earned three degrees between 1884 and 1889. For almost a decade he was dean of the School of Forestry at Colorado College, a position he began in 1904.

He married Carolyn Scofield on April 4, 1889, and they had four children.

He died at his home in Manhattan on September 29, 1942.

Sturgis is best known for his research into the Myxomycetes (slime molds). He collected extensively in the state of Colorado, and described several new species from there. After his death, his collections and correspondence were given to the herbarium of the New York Botanical Garden. The species Didymium sturgisii is named in his honor.

== See also ==
- List of mycologists
