= Wessells =

Wessells is a surname. Notable people with the surname include:

- Frances Wessells (1919–2024), American dancer, choreographer, and associate professor
- Henry W. Wessells (1809–1889), American Civil War veteran
- Hunter Wessells (born c. 1963), American urologist and academic
