= Flora G. Pollack =

American mycologist

- Born: April 24, 1919
- Died: May 15, 1997 (aged 78); Naples, Florida
- Education: Botany, Brooklyn College
- Occupation: Mycologist
- Employer(s): United States Department of Agriculture, American Type Culture Collection

Flora Green Pollack (April 24, 1919 – May 15, 1997) was a mycologist employed at different times by the United States Department of Agriculture and the American Type Culture Collection and is best known for her work enhancing fungal preservation protocols, describing coelomycetous fungal species, compiling literature on plant-associated fungi, and developing an extensive reference on the nomenclature of the leaf spot genus Cercospora.

== Early life and career (1919–1961) ==
Flora Pollack was born Flora Green on April 24, 1919, in the United States to Sarah and Lawrence Green, though other publicly available information on her childhood is scarce. She graduated with a degree in botany from Brooklyn College in New York and took on her first professional mycological role within the United States Department of Agriculture (USDA) Bureau of Entomology and Plant Quarantine (BEPQ) in the 1940s. During this period, she also met Seymour Pollack (who worked in the same Washington, D.C., office for the Treasury Department), proceeding to marry him in late 1944. Some of her earliest work from this period includes a description of Elsinoë growing on camphor as well as Dendryphium obstipum on imported taro root and Bartalinia nolinae (now Alpakesa) on dead beargrass from Arizona. However, on account of her growing family (ultimately consisting of three children, including a daughter, Gail), Pollack left her post and would not recommence her scientific activities for over a decade.

== American Type Culture Collection (1961–1967) ==
Pollack returned to her career by taking on a position at the American Type Culture Collection (ATCC) in the spring of 1961, just one month after the organization had purchased permanent facilities in Rockville, Maryland. Though the ATCC had been founded over six decades earlier with the primary goal of creating an institution through which bacterial cultures could be easily stored and disseminated, it had incorporated a special (albeit separately housed) collection of yeasts by the late 1920s, dedicated a small room to fungal isolates within its central repository by 1937, and maintained over 1,896 preserved fungi by 1954. As the fungal collection grew, the need for effective long-term storage became increasingly important. By 1965, standard practice generally dictated that isolates be kept in two forms: 1) as dried or frozen material that could be resurrected for reuse and 2) as live cultures perpetuated through occasional serial transfer onto fresh slants, though the emergence of mutants in over-transferred strains would lead Pollack and colleague Roger Goos to emphasize the importance of keeping inactive versions of the original isolate whenever possible. Freeze-drying would have been the most common technique for this type of preservation at the time of Pollack's employment. However, it did not work for all fungi, and alternative methods were sorely needed. By the time Pollack joined the ATCC, her colleague Shuh-Wei Hwang would have already begun work on a liquid nitrogen-based technique for slowly chilling lyophilization-intolerant strains, which she (Hwang) would ultimately demonstrate to be an effective means of retaining inactive but viable samples for most fungi submitted to the collection.

Though strains processed in this fashion remained invaluable for experimental purposes and distribution to other research institutions, freeze-dried and cryopreserved fungal samples did not constitute particularly effective reference specimens for those hoping to make morphological evaluations (for example, of cultures being maintained via serial transfer that might need to be watched for signs of visible degradation.) The Commonwealth Mycological Institute had published a method for this purpose in 1960, but the technique often failed to leave the agar disc completely intact and flat and thus reduced the usefulness of these dried specimens as points of comparison. Pollack solved this problem by developing a version of the protocol in which cultures (growing within an agar-filled petri plate) were processed in a drying device with formaldehyde, allowed to sit with the lid removed so water could evaporate from the surface of the dead colony, and then placed in 2.5% glycerol agar within a petri dish cover until the solution hardened. This resulted in a disc that remained supple, unbroken, and more amenable to use in a laboratory environment.

== Animal and Plant Health Inspection Service (1967–1979) ==
In 1967, Pollack left the ATCC to resume plant inspection work for the USDA. By this time, she was a member of the Mycological Society of America living on Tallwood Terrace in Falls Church, VA, nearly 30 miles away from her new place of employment in Beltsville, Maryland [12]. Due to administrative restructuring, she found that she was not returning to the BEPQ, but instead the Plant Quarantine Division of the Agricultural Resource Service (ARS), which would during her tenure be combined with the Plant Pest Control Division and then absorbed by the Animal and Plant Health Inspection Service (APHIS) with its creation in 1970. Though she collaborated extensively with her coworkers at APHIS, she would be its sole active plant quarantine pathologist for the entirety of her appointment.

Pollack continued to publish new species descriptions and commentaries on organisms encountered during her inspection duties, including Arthrinium japonicum forming conidia on imported straw packing product, Colletogloeum fouquieriae as a leaf disease of the ocotillo plant, Platypella angustispora affecting palms imported from Mexico, Cercospora uromycestri parasitizing Uromyces cestri on diseased day-blooming cestrum, Deightoniella argemonensis afflicting Mexican pricklepoppy, and Mycocentrospora verrucose producing disease in spindle trees. She expressed particular interest in coelomycetes that generate asexual spores within specialized conidiomata (although the group has since been made taxonomically obsolete by molecular phylogenies). Several of her publications are associated with fungi found on mountain mahogany, describing Carmarosporellum cercocarpi and remarking on other common species occurring on Cercocarpus, as well as resolving taxonomic confusion conflating Sphaeoma cercocarpi and Gloeosporium cercocarpi by moving the later to Gloeosporidina. She also reported Alternaria macrospora on spurred anoda (normally a cotton pathogen, but in this unusual instance only impacting weeds growing in Mississippi fields), documented the first occurrence of Puccinia erianthi on sugarcane in Puerto Rico and Jamaica, and helped devise a short key and descriptions to assist with identifications of major bromeliad rust pathogens. Her work in various areas earned her invitations to attend international mycological conferences in Canada and England, and in addition to her own publications, the extensive catalog of literature she compiled to assist with fungal identification during this period gave her successors a vast array of material with which to publish a definitive guide and later a USDA database on important papers in the field.

Pollack's descriptions of Monosporascus cannonballus are perhaps the most well-known contribution she made to plant pathology during this period, as this fungus has since been implicated in causing an economically significant canopy collapse disease in melons. The pathogen had previously been observed by Charles Troutman and J.C. Matejka in cantaloupe, but Pollack and F.A. Uecker provided a more extensive description after Troutman sent it to APHIS for further inspection. Pollack and Uecker remained interested in the pathogen on account of its interesting morphological features and published a second paper in 1975 examining its ascocarp in additional detail, tracing its development and the formation of the ostiole (pore) through which it discharges its ascospores (remaining within their asci as they are pushed out into a bead of fluid at the top of the perithecia), as well as its process of meiosis.

== Retirement (1979–1997) ==
Pollack resigned from the USDA for the second and final time in 1979 on account of illness, but she made one final major contribution to mycology during her retirement: the 1987 Annotated Compilation of Cercospora Names, disentangling a complicated network of taxonomic and nomenclatural changes in an important fungal genus with hundreds of members producing leaf spot on a wide variety of plants. As B. C. Sutton put it in his review of the work, the text was "as dull and dry as ditchwater, but indispensable to those for whom it was designed"; it remains one of Pollack's most extensively cited works.

In the final years of her life, Pollack moved to Florida and was able to pursue her numerous personal interests, including gardening, bookbinding, singing, and rescuing animals with the Nature Conservancy. She died in Naples, Florida, on May 15, 1997, at the age of 78.

For a selected bibliography of Pollack's work, see the references below.
