= Catherine Gross Duncan =

American mycologist

Catherine Gross Duncan (1908-1968) was an American mycologist from the early 20th century. Her major area of focus was wood-decay fungi.

== Early life ==
Catherine Gross was born on April 4, 1908, in the town of Manilla, Indiana. In 1931, she received her A.B. Degree in botany from the Depauw University in Greencastle, Indiana. She went on to earn her M.S. and her P.h.D. from the University of Wisconsin in 1933 and 1935 respectively. During her graduate career, she specialized in plant cytology and agricultural bacteriology under the supervision of Charles E. Allen and W.D. Frost. A fellow student, Robert E. Duncan was also studying in Allen’s lab. She was married to Robert E. Duncan and had a daughter, Dana Duncan. Both she and Robert worked at the University of Wisconsin at Madison.

Shortly after graduating, her first position was as an assistant professor at Hood College, where she served until 1942. In December 1942, she joined the Forest Products Laboratory (a division of the United States Forest Service) at Madison, Wisconsin in cooperation with the University of Wisconsin. Originally, she was recruited by the Laboratory to aid in the war effort. However, after the war, she stayed on for the remainder of her career. She eventually rose to the rank of principal pathologist at the lab in the Wood Fungi and Insects Research, where she served until her death in 1968.

She was very dedicated to her work, often working on the weekends and extended hours. She is also mentioned to have an innate curiosity of all facets of biology. She also had the ability to be easy-going, yet also exacting in her own work.

== Career ==
During her career, she published over 40 papers examining various aspects of wood decay fungi, including (but not limited to): sunlight and the effect on respiration, effect of preservatives, and moisture. She also regularly published new findings in regards to species found on decaying wood. A majority of her work surrounded the quality and improvement of wood preservatives. Several articles alluded to the notion that fungi could overcome some rather toxic compounds, such as arsenic.

Duncan studied the decay of wood as it pertains to fungal degradation. In her early work, she was responsible for assessing the natural decay of wood from many species. One technique that she was involved in developing was the soil-block technique.

Based on articles written, she worked on Basidiomycota and Ascomycota in regards to their role in wood decay. A majority of her work was identifying Ascomycetes associated with wood decay. She examined the capacity of these fungi to attack various types of wood treatments, both synthetic and naturally occurring.

Shortly after graduating with her Ph.D., Duncan taught botany and bacteriology at Hood College in Maryland. She continued to study under her major advisor, Allen during the summertime. During this period, she studied the various stages of meiosis that Sphaerocarpos spp. undergoes during its life cycle. In 1942, both Catherine and Robert Duncan accepted positions at the University of Wisconsin.

Early in her career, one of the first projects she completed in the forest products laboratory was to examine the natural resistance of decay from different species of trees. In order to study these differences, she also helped develop a technique known as the soil-block technique, which allows for wood decay to be studied at an accelerated rate. This technique became especially important when evaluating wood preservatives and their longevity. This technique is still used today. Basic laboratory techniques for studying wood decay were severely lacking in 1942. These basic laboratory techniques would be used in her later work in addition to being adopted by other agencies, such as the American Society for Testing and Materials (ASTM).

In building on techniques developed in her early work, Duncan became focused on individual components extracted from wood and their relationship to wood decay. This work was particularly relevant to “soft rot” fungi and the effect the aforementioned fungi had on the invasion of different hosts. Her focus was to add longevity to wood species that were found to be less resistant to microbial decay. Her work on soft rot fungi also led her to identifying and describing the fungi from a physiological standpoint. During her later career, she discovered a novel relationship between sunlight and respiration of basidiomycetes. Additionally, she also worked with ascomycetes and their ability to cause soft-rot symptoms on wood.

In 1963, Duncan was recognized for her ability to conduct fundamental research and this led to an 18-month appointment abroad working with Frey-Wyssling, a renowned Swiss fungal physiologist. During her appointment, she developed a new technique known as immunofluorescence. This technique proved to be helpful in studying the synthesis and mobilization of cellulase in the hyphae into the host substrate. Duncan also investigated the growth and movement of soft-rot fungi into the wood substrate, made possible by the use of a fluorescent staining technique.

During her tenure at the Forest Products Laboratory, she was involved with the dissertations of 30 students. Students noted that "It was always a challenge to meet her standards for rigor and proof in research".

In 1963, Duncan was recognized for her work with two postdoctoral fellowships. The first was awarded by the Forest Products Laboratory. The other was awarded by the National Science Foundation. Duncan also was a member of the American Association for the Advancement of Science (AAAS), the American Phytopathological Society (APS), and the Botanical Society of America.

Both her experience in cytology and her ability to culture diverse wood-inhabiting fungi led to many advances in the fundamental studies in fungal physiology and the interactions observed with plant cell walls. During her career, she published nearly 40 major contributions to the field.

== See also ==
- List of mycologists
