= Leucocoprinus austrofragilis =

Scientific classification
- Kingdom: Fungi
- Division: Basidiomycota
- Class: Agaricomycetes
- Order: Agaricales
- Family: Agaricaceae
- Genus: Leucocoprinus
- Species: L. austrofragilis

Binomial name
- Leucocoprinus austrofragilis Aberdeen (1992)

Species of fungus

Leucocoprinus austrofragilis
- Mycological characteristics
- Gills on hymenium
- Cap is convex
- Hymenium is free
- Stipe has a ring
- Spore print is white to cream
- Ecology is saprotrophic
- Edibility is unknown

Leucocoprinus austrofragilis is a species of mushroom producing fungus in the family Agaricaceae.

== Taxonomy ==
It was first described in 1992 by the Australian mycologist John Errol Chandos Aberdeen who classified it as Leucocoprinus austrofragilis.

== Description ==
Leucocoprinus austrofragilis is a cream or very pale brown dapperling mushroom known from Australia.

Cap: 1-2.5cm wide, convex and flattening with membranous flesh. The surface is cream or very light brown with a dark brown umbo at the centre and minute brown scales across the entire surface which quickly vanish. The cap edges have striations. Stem: 3-3.5cm long and 1.5-2mm thick tapering upwards from the 2-3mm thick base. It is smooth and whitish with a slightly brown tint. The membranous stem ring is located below the middle of the stem (inferior) but is not persistent and may vanish. Gills: Free, crowded and white but discolouring slightly when dry. Spore print: Pale whitish, nearly white. Spores: Elliptical with a pore. Dextrinoid. 7-9 x 5.5-6 μm.

== Habitat and distribution ==
L. austrofragilis is scarcely recorded and little known. The specimens studied by Aberdeen were collected by A.B. Cribb in March 1963 who found them growing in grass during wet weather in Brisbane, Queensland, Australia. The GBIF and the Atlas of Living Australia only have the single record submitted by Aberdeen as well as some unconfirmed observations from iNaturalist.
