= Luigi Provasoli =

Italian phycologist

- Born: 1908; Busto Arsizio, Italy
- Died: 30 October 1992 (aged 83–84); Comerio, Italy
- Education: University of Milan
- Scientific career
- Fields: Phycology
- Workplaces: University of Camerino; St. Francis College; Haskins Laboratories; Yale University
- Author abbrev. (botany): Provasoli

Luigi Provasoli (1908 – 30 October 1992) was an Italian phycologist, professor, and expert on the nutrition, physiology, and cultivation of algae, protozoa, and invertebrates.

== Career ==
Provasoli attended the University of Milan and earned his degree in 1931. He continued his studies into protozoa, silkworms and flagellates, and received his Ph.D. in zoology in 1939. After his graduation, he worked in the lab of Andre Lwoff at the Pasteur Institute in Paris and developed a deep interest in algae. In 1942, he was appointed Professor at the University of Camerino.

Provasoli emigrated to the U.S. with his American wife after the outbreak of WWII. He was hired as an instructor at St. Francis College. By 1948, he was appointed Professor and Chairman of Biology. In 1951, Provasoli began collaborating with Seymour Hutner of Brooklyn College and Caryl Haskins of Haskins Laboratories in Manhattan.

In the 1960s, he served thrice on the President's Science Advisory Committee. He was president of the Phycological Society of America in 1961.

In 1970, Provasoli moved with Haskins to New Haven, Connecticut and began to research at Yale University's Osborn Memorial Laboratories. He remained with Haskins until 1981. He also taught at Yale from 1970 until his retirement in 1987.

Provasoli served on the boards of the American Institute of Biological Science and the American Type Culture Collection, and also was an adviser to the National Science Foundation and Smithsonian Institution. Provasoli was the founding editor of the Journal of Phycology. Over the course of his career, he published over 80 works.

== Awards ==
In 1982, Provasoli received the Gilbert Morgan Smith Medal from the National Academy of Sciences.

== Legacy ==
The Phycological Society of America gives the Luigi Provasoli Award annually to authors of outstanding papers published in the Journal of Phycology.
