= Mathilde Bensaude =

Portuguese phytopathologist and mycologist

Mathilde Bensaúde
- Born: 23 January 1890
- Died: 22 November 1969 (aged 79); Lisbon, Portugal
- Education: University at Lausanne, Switzerland; Sorbonne, University of Paris
- Known for: Discovery of heterothallism in basidiomycetes and pioneering work in plant pathology
- Scientific career
- Fields: Mycology, Botany, Plant Pathology
- Doctoral advisor: Louis Matruchot

Mathilde Simone Rachel Pauline Bensaude was an internationally renowned mycologist and plant pathologist whose pioneering doctoral thesis at the Sorbonne first showed heterothallism in the basidiomycetes. Bensaúde is also a major pioneer in the field of Plant Pathology in Portugal, and founded Portugal's Plant Quarantine Services and is one of the founders of the Portugal Society of Biology.

== Biography ==
Mathilde Bensaude was born in 1890 in Lisbon, Portugal to the wealthy and prominent engineer Alfredo Bensaude, who founded Portugal's Instituto Superior Tecnico in Lisbon. Her mother, Jane Oulman Bensaude was a French author of children's books.

Having been exposed to agricultural problems through the tobacco plantation that her father inherited, Bensaude was broadly trained in several fields of biology including embryology, protozoology, histology, zoology, and evolution. She received undergraduate training at the University of Lausanne in Switzerland in the physical and natural sciences. Bensaude's graduate training was in the Sorbonne in Paris. The outbreak of World War I in Europe prompted Bensaude to leave Paris and return to Portugal at the urging of her father (Mota, 2008). She eventually returned to Paris and resumed her doctoral thesis in mycology, specifically the mysterious origin of the binucleate stage in basidiomycete mycelia. Her findings were published in 1917 as a brief paper, “Sexuality in the Basidiomycete Fungi” and in the subsequent “Research in the evolutionary cycle and sexuality of Basidiomycetes.”

== Heterothallism in the Basidiomycetes ==
Prior to Bensaude's work, heterothallism had already been described in lower fungi, the Zygomycetes, by Albert Francis Blakeslee, published in Science (1904). Blakeslee reported that zygospores were only formed by a thallus with two different types of basidia, which were given +/- designations.

Bensaude's thesis described the formation of clamp connections in the diploid thallus of Coprinus fimetarius syn. Coprinopsis cinerea, and the homology between the hook of ascogenous hyphae and clamp connections. Bensaude's report of heterothallism in basidiomycetes was met with some doubt as heterothallism was assumed not to occur in higher fungi (Jones, 1972). German botanist Hans Kniep, unaware of Bensaude's work due to the chaos of World War I in Europe, presented identical findings 2 years after Bensaude's thesis in 1920. Kniep's detailed work corroborated Bensaude's, with both studies contributing major insights into the mating behavior of higher fungi. Kniep, Arthur Henry Reginald Buller, and Buller's students went on to further study fungal mating systems and behavior (Ainsworth, 1976). Buller in his Researches in Fungi (1958) wrote a dedication to Bensaude for her significant contributions to the cytological behavior of fungi.

Bensaude went on to make significant contributions to the field of plant pathology, particularly in the treatment and prevention of plant diseases in Portugal.

== Post-doctoral studies at the University of Wisconsin-Madison ==
After her graduate studies, Bensaude worked with L.R. Jones and G.W. Keitt at the University of Wisconsin- Madison from 1920 to 1923. Publications from her work there dealt with Cladosporium species on stone fruits. Her work on Olpidium in tobacco and cabbage seedlings in 1923 was the first reference to this genus as a root parasite in American literature.

Bensaude is honored with a plaque at UW-Madison's Department of Plant Pathology Library for her contributions to the field of mycology and plant pathology (Mota, 2008).

== Pioneering work in plant pathology ==
Following her work at the University of Wisconsin – Madison, Bensaude went to Portugal as a director of an experiment station until 1927 when she joined the research Institute Rocha Cabral (Jones, 1972). In 1931 she was called upon by the Ministry of Agriculture in Lisbon to establish Portugal's Plant Quarantine Services (Servicos de Inspeccao Fitopatologica). Bensaude's expertise in pests and pathogens of economically important crops such as pineapple, potato, garlic, wheat and onion led to many significant publications for the control, prevention, and treatment of plant diseases in Portugal. Notable pathogens studied by Bensaude include Sychytrium endobacterium (potato wart), Clavibacter sependonicum (potato ring rot), and a species of Phytophthora on citrus (Mota, 2008; Ainsworth, 1976; Jones, 1972).

In addition to the Plant Quarantine Services, Bensaude was one of the founders of the Portuguese Society of Biology. Bensaude was also instrumental in the establishment of the now internationally known Coffee Rust Research Center (CIFC) at Oeiras, Portugal in 1955.

== See also ==
- List of mycologists
