= Everett Smith Beneke =

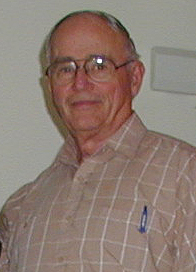
Photo of Professor Everett Smith Beneke, Mycologist, taken in Safety Harbor FL, ca. 2000

Everett Smith Beneke (July 6, 1918 – May 21, 2010) was an American medical mycologist, and professor of microbiology at Michigan State University (1948–1987). Beneke chaired the American Board of Bioanalysis (1968–2004), he lived in Florida and died in 2010 at the age of 91. He made contributions to the field of human mycoses.

== Study and work background ==
Beneke graduated from Miami University (Ohio) in 1940. After getting a PhD from University of Illinois in 1948, he became a faculty member of Michigan State University (MSU), from which he retired in 1987. Beneke had two major research interests. The first study was about species in the puffball genus Calvatia, particularly Calvatia gigantea. In 1964, he researched human fungal pathogens in Brazilian soil. Afterwards, he discovered some particular traits of mycology for medical and became expert of human mycoses. Especially Candida and candidiasis were his concentrations. Numerous books were published by Beneke and his partner Alvin Rogers; these publications set fundamental criteria for the later studies. When Beneke was in MSU, he taught medical mycology for the students of physicians, microbiologists and veterinarians at MSU with Rogers, and at the Medical School of the Federal University of Mina Gerais, Belo Horizontal Brazil during the summers. Both Beneke and Rogers served as short-term consultants for the MSU/Brazilian project. After Al Rogers’ death, Beneke set up a graduate fellowship named after Al Rogers at MSU.

== Honors ==
Beneke received several honors and awards during his career:

- 1961–1962: President of Mycological Society of America; Chairman of the section on mycology of the International Association of Microbiological Societies; A symposium was published in Mycopathologia (Vol. 109, No.2)
- 1968–2004: Chaired the American Board of Bioanalysis
- 1971: The honor roll of Journal of Diseases of Children
- 1987: Meritorious Faculty Award by College of Natural Sciences of Michigan State University
- 1991: Recipient of AAB’s Lucien Dean Herter Memorial Award.

== Selected publications ==
- “A New Species of Achlya and of Dictyuchus Journal of the Elisha Mitchell Scientific Society, December 1948 v.64, pt. 2, pp.261-266
- “Calvatia, calvacin and cancer”. MYCOLOGIA, 1963 v.55 pp. 257–270
- “Medical Mycology Manual with human mycoses monograph” (with Alvin Rogers). Minneapolis, Burgess Publishing Company ISBN 0-8087-4042-3
- "The Incidence and Pectolytic Activity of Fungi Isolated from Michigan Strawberry Fruits" (with LS White, FW Fabian) Applied Microbiology, March 25, 1954, pp. 253–258

== See also ==
- List of mycologists

== Bibliography ==
- Beneke & Rogers. "Medical mycology and human mycoses". Star Pub. Co., 1996
- Everett Smith Beneke. "Human mycoses". Upjohn Co., 1979
- Everett Smith Beneke. "Medical Mycology: Laboratory Manual". Burgess, 1968
- Constantine John Alexopoulos & Everett Smith Beneke."Laboratory Manual for Introductory Mycology".Burgess Publishing Company, 1965
- Everett Smith Beneke."Scope monograph on Human Mycoses".Upjohn Company, 1978
- Everett Smith Beneke.PESTICIDES IN AQUATIC FUNGI IN THE THREE RIVERS AREA".MICHIGAN STATE UNIV, EAST LANSING, Department OF BOTANY AND INSTITUTE OF WATER RESEARCH, FOR OWRR, 1973
- São Paulo (Brazil : State). Instituto de Botânica.Volume 2".Secretaria da Agricultura, Instituto de Botânica., 1965, p. 124, p. 193, p. 195
