= Britt Bunyard =

American mycologist and author

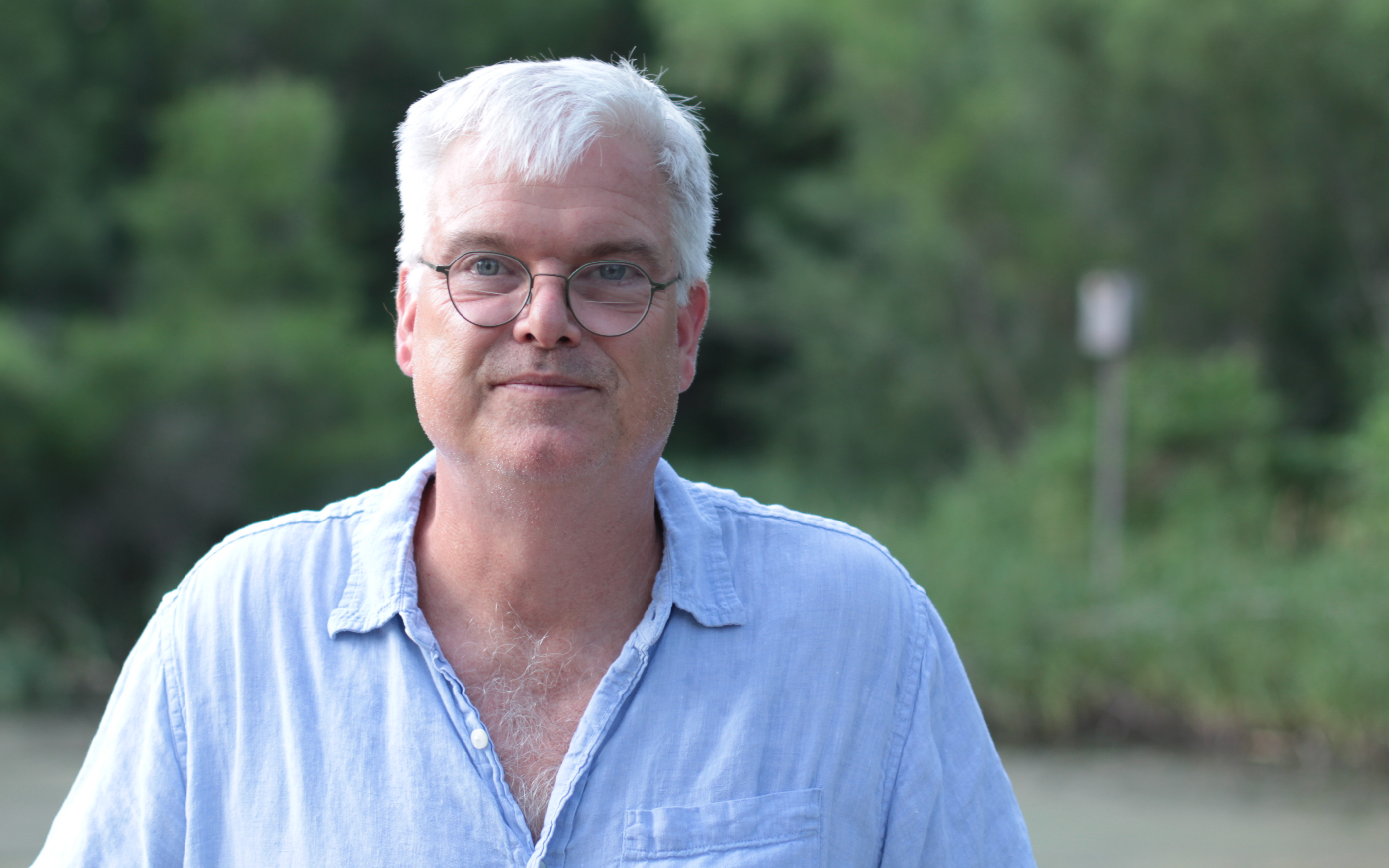
- Bunyard's photo
- Born: August 6, 1966 (age 60)

Academic background
- Education: Clemson University; Pennsylvania State University

Britt Bunyard (born August 5, 1966) is an American mycologist and author known for his contributions to the field of mycology. He serves as the editor-in-chief of FUNGI Magazine, and has written several academic works. Bunyard earned an MS degree in Plant Biochemistry from Clemson University in 1991, and PhD in plant pathology at Pennsylvania State University in 1995.

== Career ==
Bunyard served as the editor-in-chief of the North American Mycological Association's journal, McIlvainea. He has served as the executive director of the Telluride Mushroom Festival since 2014.

== Selected publications ==
- Bunyard, Britt (2024). The Little Book of Fungi (Little Books of Nature). Princeton University Press (published October 22, 2024). ISBN 9780691259888.
- Bunyard, Britt Allen (July 15, 2022). The Lives of Fungi: A Natural History of our Planet's Decomposers. Princeton: Princeton University Press. ISBN 978-0-691-22984-3. OCLC 1264721280.
- Bunyard, Britt Allen; Lynch, Tavis (2021). The beginner's guide to mushrooms: everything you need to know, from foraging to cultivating. Beverly, MA: Quarry Books. ISBN 978-1-63159-911-8. OCLC 1197772139.
- Bunyard, Britt; Justice, Jay (2020). Amanitas Of North America. The Fungi Press. ISBN 9780578675725.

== Awards ==
Bunyard was awarded the Gary Lincoff Award for Contributions to Amateur Mycology by the North American Mycological Association.
