= Elmar Leppik =

Estonian botanist and mycologist (1898-1978)

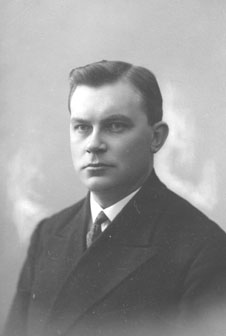
- Elmar Emil Leppik
- Born: 3 December 1898; Jõgeva Parish, Governorate of Estonia, Russian Empire
- Died: 1978 (aged 79–80)
- Known for: Established a mycological herbarium and library at the University of Tartu
- Scientific career
- Fields: Mycology
- Institutions: Rockefeller Foundation
- Thesis: (1928)
- Author abbrev. (botany): Leppik

Elmar Emil Leppik, earlier Lepik (1898–1978) was an Estonian mycologist and theoretical biologist. He established a mycological herbarium and library at the University of Tartu. His birth date in 1898 has been given variously as 3 or 4 October or as 3 December, he died 4 November 1978 in Maryland.

Leppik, the son of a farmer, was born in Jõgeva Parish, a rural municipality of Estonia north of Tartu. During his student years, he was interested in both mycology and algology. Following graduation, Leppik was a fellow at the Rockefeller Foundation and later the University of Tartu. Among his instructors were the prominent mycologists Eduard Fischer and Ernst Albert Gäumann. He earned his PhD in 1928 in Zürich before returning to Estonia to work at the University of Tartu. There, he was employed first as Acting Assistant Professor (1929–1931), then Assistant Professor (1931–1938), Professor Extraordinary (1938–1942), and finally Professor (1942–1944). Between 1932 and 1940 he edited and distributed the exsiccata work Fungi Estonici exsiccati.

In 1950 he moved to the United States, where he taught for the first seven years at the Augustana University in South Dakota and worked as a research scientist at the Hormel Institute at the University of Minnesota. In 1964 he moved to Beltsville, Maryland, where he would stay for the rest of his life. His interests during this time shifted towards the phylogeny of flowering plants and fungi, evolutionary classification of flower species, plant coevolution, insect pollination, and bee biology.

== Selected works ==
(important publications)

- Lepik E., 1941. "Einige Fragmente aus der geschichtlichen Entwicklung der ostbaltischen Pilzflora". Tartu R. Ülikooli juures oleva Loodusuurijate Seltsi aruanded (Annales societatis rebus naturae investigandis in Universitate Tartuensi constitutae) 47(1/2): 81–145.
- Leppik E., 1955. "Some viewpoints on the origin and evolution of flowering plants". Acta Biotheoretica 9(2): 45–56.
- Leppik E., 1956. "The form and function of numerical patterns in flowers". American Journal of Botany 43: 445–455.
- Leppik, E. E., 1957. "Hologeny, a complementary concept of phylogeny". Annales Societatis Tartuensis ad Res Naturae Investigandas Constitutae (series nova in excilio condita) 1: 41–51.
- Leppik E., 1970. "Phylogeny, hologeny and coenogeny, basic concepts of environmental biology". Acta Biotheoretica 23(3-4): 170–193.

== See also ==
- List of mycologists
