= Rudolf Aderhold =

German mycologist (1865–1907)

Rudolf Ferdinand Theodor Aderhold (12 February 1865 in Frankenhausen – 17 March 1907 in Berlin-Dahlem) was a German mycologist and pomologist.

He obtained his education at the University of Berlin as a student of August Wilhelm Eichler and Simon Schwendener, and at the University of Jena, where he served as an assistant to plant physiologist Christian Ernst Stahl. In 1891 he began work at the Forschungsanstalt für Garten- und Weinbau in Geisenheim, and in 1893 became director of the botanical department in the experimental station at the institute of pomology in Proskau.

In 1901 he was named director of the botanical laboratory within the Biologischen Abteilung für Land- und Forstwirtschaft (Biological Department of Agriculture and Forestry) at the Imperial Health Office in Berlin. In 1905 he was appointed director of the Biologische Anstalt für Land- und Forstwirtschaft (Biological Research Centre for Agriculture and Forestry).

He is remembered for his investigations of fungi, in particular, its role as a pathogen affecting fruit trees. He made contributions in his studies of the mycological genera Sclerotinia, Monilia, and Venturia.

== Selected writings ==
- Zur Kenntnis der Obstbaum-Sklerotinien, 1905 (with Wilhelm Ruhland) - To the understanding of Sclerotinia affecting fruit trees.
- Die Monilia-Krankheiten unserer Obstbäume und ihre Bekämpfung, 1905 - The disease caused by Monilia that affects fruit trees and the fight against it.
- Die Kaiserliche Biologische Anstalt für Land- und Forstwirtschaft in Dahlem, 1906 - Imperial Biological Research Centre for Agriculture and Forestry in Dahlem.
- Über den Bakterienbrand der Kirschbäume, 1906 (with Wilhelm Ruhland) - On the bacterial blight of cherry trees.
- Die Fusicladien unserer Obstbäume, 1908 - Fusicladium associated with fruit trees.
- Der amerikanische Mehltau des Stachelbeerstrauches, eine nach Deutschland verschleppte Pflanzenkrankheit, 1914 (with Wilhelm Ruhland) - A mildew from America affecting gooseberry shrubs, a new plant disease in Germany.

== See also ==
- List of mycologists
