= Edwin Schild-Zamuner =

Swiss mycologist (1927–2014)

- Born: 14 September 1927; Brienz, CH
- Died: 16 November 2014 (aged 87)
- Known for: Taxonomy of Ramaria
- Scientific career
- Fields: Mycology
- Author abbrev. (botany): Schild

Edwin Schild-Zamuner (1927–2014) was a Swiss mycologist. He was known for his taxonomic research on coral fungi (the genus Ramaria).

== Mycological contributions ==
Schild's mycological career was dedicated to coral fungi and over 37 new European species of Ramaria as well as 11 new species of other coral fungi. He described 24 species from Switzerland from the area surrounding Brienz. 31 species were discovered from Mediterranean deciduous forests of his adopted home, Italy.

== Publications ==
Schild authored or coauthored many research publications:

- 1982. "Ramaria-Studien". Zeitschrift fur Mykologie 48 (1)
