= Howard C. Whisler =

American mycologist

Howard C. Whisler (1931–2007) was an American mycologist. Born in Oakland, California, he attended Berkeley schools and then Palo Alto High School. Howard worked on his undergraduate degree at Oregon State College for two years and then went to the University of California, Berkeley, where he completed a Bachelor of Science degree in plant pathology in 1954. He joined the United States Air Force from 1954 to 1956 stationed in Italy. He returned to University of California, Berkeley after his military life and had finished his doctoral degree with Ralph Emerson in 1960. From 1960 to 1961 he held a post doctoral NATO-NSF Fellowship in France, at the Université de Montpellier. Howard was appointed assistant professor of Botany at McGill University in 1961. He was appointed to the faculty at the University of Washington on March 15, 1963 and worked until he died on September 16, 2007, at the age of 76.

== Work ==
Whisler had great admiration for Roland Thaxter and Cap Weston. When Whisler was an undergraduate at the University of California, Berkeley, he was introduced to the study of zoosporic fungi. During his graduate work at University of California, Berkeley he focused on fungi associated with invertebrates, receiving his doctorate in 1960 for a study of the entomogenous fungus Amoebidium parasiticum (Protozoan). He published his first paper on Amoebidium parasiticum (Protozoan) on Daphnia in the journal Nature in 1960. After that, he published a number of articles on zoosporic fungi. Additional publications included those on the Trichomycetes, Entomophthorales, Rubetella inopinata and Carouxella scalaris, with J. F. Manier and L. Rioux.^{[1]} He published many articles on the biology of Coelomomyces.^{[2, 3, 4]} From 1970, he did some research on members of the Oomycota, insect parasites in the Zygomycota and Ascomycota, and even delved for a bit into the Basidiomycota with G. A. Escobar, D. E. McCabe and C. W. Harpel.^{[5, 6]} In the 1990s, Whisler carried out research on Saprolegnia parasitica, an oomycete parasite of Chinook salmon, as well as Woronia polycystis, a hyperparasitic organism that attacks ‘’Saprolegnia’’.

Whisler was an active member of the Mycological Society of America. He was also a founder of the International Society of Evolutionary Protistology with Max Taylor and Lynn Margulis.

Whisler advised a number of graduate students who worked on aquatic fungi. He followed Emerson's tradition of allowing his students to be sole authors on papers from his lab, even though his direction and collaboration were an important component of the research.

== Described species ==
- Enterobryus bifurcatus
- Pteromaklron protrudens
- Stigmatomyces ceratophorus

== Selected publications ==
Whisler published nearly 35 articles and books about fungi as mosquito parasites.^{[1]}

- Whisler, H.C. 1960. Pure culture of the Trichomycete, Amoebidium parasiticum. Nature 186:732-733. doi:10.1038/186732a0
- Whisler, H.C. 1963. Observations on some new and unusual enterophilous Phycomycetes. Can. J. Bot. 41:887-900. doi:10.1139/b63-074
- Whisler, H.C. 1967. Experimental studies with a new species of Stigmatomyces. Mycologia 60:65-75. doi:10.2307/3757314
- Whisler, H.C. and M.S. Fuller. 1968. Preliminary observations of the holdfast of Amoebidium parasiticum. Mycologia 60:1068-1079. doi:10.2307/3757291
- Whisler, H.C., S.L. Zebold and J.A. Shemanchuk. 1974. Alternate host for mosquito parasite Coelomomyces. Nature 251:715-716. doi:10.1038/251715a0
- Whisler, H.C., S.L. Zebold and J.A. Shemanchuk. 1975. The life history of Coelomomyces psorophorae. Proc. Natl. Acad. Sci. USA 72:693-696.
