= North American Mycological Association =

American non-profit organisation about mycology

The North American Mycological Association (NAMA), is a non-profit organization of amateurs and professionals who are interested in fungi, including mushrooms, morels, truffles, molds, and related organisms. NAMA aims "to promote, pursue, and advance the science of mycology."

== Membership ==
Membership is open to all persons interested in fungi, including both professionals and amateurs of any skill level.

== Publications ==
The official journal of NAMA is McIlvainea: The Journal of Amateur Mycology, which is published bi-annually.

NAMA members also receive The Mycophile, NAMA's bi-monthly newsletter.

NAMA members also provide educational material for teaching and learning about fungi via their website.

== Activities ==
Since 1961, NAMA has sponsored an annual foray, at which members meet to collect and identify mushrooms and other fungi. Each year the foray takes place in a different location in North America.

NAMA tracks North American mushroom poisoning cases (of humans and animals), and maintains a registry for submission of new cases. NAMA also provides a guide to mushroom poisoning symptoms.

== See also ==
- Mycological Society of America, NAMA's sister society for professional mycologists
