= Hunter Wessells =

American urologist

Hunter Buchanan Wessells (born c. 1963) is an American urologist.

Hunter Buchanan Wessells was born to Henry W. Wessells III and his wife Nancy Hunter Wessells. The family was related to Henry W. Wessells, and lived in Paoli, Pennsylvania. Hunter Buchanan Wessells earned his undergraduate and medical degrees from Georgetown University, and at the time of his marriage to Bokgi Choi in 1995, was an assistant professor of urology at the University of Arizona Health Science Center, where Choi also taught.

Wessells holds the Nelson Chair of Urology at the University of Washington. In 2021, the American Association of Genitourinary Surgeons awarded him the Barringer Medal.
