= Puccinia erianthi =

Scientific classification
- Domain: Eukaryota
- Kingdom: Fungi
- Division: Basidiomycota
- Class: Pucciniomycetes
- Order: Pucciniales
- Family: Pucciniaceae
- Genus: Puccinia
- Species: P. erianthi

Binomial name
- Puccinia erianthi Padwick & A. Khan (1944)

Species of fungus

Puccinia erianthi is a species of fungus and a plant pathogen. It was originally found on the leaves of Erianthus fulvus (now called Eulalia aurea) in Punjab, India. It is a common cause of sugarcane rust.

== See also ==
- List of Puccinia species
