= Maria Paz Martin Esteban =

Spanish mycologist

María-Paz Martín Esteban (born 8 November 1960 in Acehúche) is a Spanish mycologist. She has been a fellow of the Real Jardín Botánico de Madrid since 1999, and a researcher at the Spanish National Research Council since 2019. She has authored more than 200 scientific articles on the biodiversity of fungi.
