= Edouard Drouhet =

Romanian physician and mycologist (1919 - 2000)

Edouard Drouhet (June 18, 1919 – January 1, 2000) was a physician, biologist, and medical mycologist who played a key role in understanding how anti-fungal agents such as ketoconazole and amphotericin-B can be used as therapeutic treatments in humans with superficial or deep-seated mycoses.

He was one of the founding members in the International Society for Human and Animal Mycology (ISHAM) and the French Society of Medical Mycology. After Edouard Drouhet's death, Edouard Drouhet is commemorated at the European Confederation of Medical Mycology by having a lecture and a medal dedicated in his name.

== Personal life ==
Drouhet was born in Bârlad, Romania into a family of French descent that also included Charles Drouhet. His grandfather was a medical doctor in Blaye, France. Victoria Drouhet was Edouard Drouhet's spouse.

== Education ==
In 1944, he received his doctorate in medicine from the University of Bucharest. However, the diploma from Bucharest was not considered equivalent to the education in France and he was expected to pass baccalaureat to thesis diplomas in France. In 1947, Drouhet studied microbiology at the Institut Pasteur and in 1948 studied serology and dermatology at the Institut Fournier.

== Career ==
Throughout Drouhet's life, he held many positions in which he was able to build upon and connect the mycologist community. In 1948, Drouhet was appointed the position of a research associate at Centre National de la Recherche Scientifique (CNRS). In 1953, he became Head of Laboratory at the Pasteur Institute under Professor Magrou.

At the Pasteur Institute, he met Gabriel Segretain and Francois Mariat. The colleagues formed a team that promoted awareness and advanced the field of medical mycology in France and Europe. Together, they organized a post-graduate course in medical mycology which had trained hundreds of mycologists in France and other foreign entities. In addition, they founded the French Society of Medical Mycology. Gabriel Segretain and Edouard Drouhet co-founded ISHAM which is a community for clinical scientists and researchers interested in fungal ailments and fungus-like diseases. In 1996, the trio received the E. Brumpt Prize of the Society of Exotic Pathology.

In 1972, Drouhet was appointed as professor at Institut Pasteur. In this position, he formed the National Reference Center for Mycoses and Antifungals. Then, in 1981 he would take the place of Grabriel Segretain as Director of the Mycology Unit at Pasteur Institute until he retired in 1987.

After retirement, Drouhet continued in his involvement in the scientific community by serving as the Chief Editor for the Journal of Medical Mycology until he fell ill in 1999.

Towards the end of his career, he was able to publish and share his identification of a new thermally dimorphic fungal species, Emmonsia pasteuriana, which was first cultured on a woman with HIV from Italy.

== Notable work ==
Prior to Drouhet's influence, Institut Pasteur mainly studied fungal pathogens on botany. Since then, Drouhet had opened up the field to include human and animal fungal pathogens as well. Drouhet's work looked into diseases of opportunistic fungi pathogens in humans and animals and he was the first in France to test the antifungal agents. He extensively studied the serum of fungal antigens such as fluconazole, ketoconazole, amphotericin-B, fluorocytosine, and itraconazole which helped standardize the medical dosage and treatments for patients.

In 1978, Drouhet published a textbook called "Fungal Antigens – Isolation, Purification and Detection" which was conceived after a symposium on fungal antigens. The book goes in depth of chemical techniques, methods of diagnosing infections, and includes studies on Candida albicans, Cryptococcus neoformans, Aspergillus fumigatus, Coccidiodes immitis, and many more contributed by a collection of other authors.

In Drouhet and Dupont's publication of “Laboratory and Clinical Assessment of Ketoconazole in Deep-Seated Mycoses”, they studied how patients with deep mycoses reacted with treatments of ketoconazole and amphotericin B. Both of which, were ineffective to treating mycoses as separate medications. The cases included a wide range of mycoses such as candidiasis, histoplasmosis, African blastomycosis, mycetoma, fungal arthritis, and newly discovered cases of cutaneous, ocular and osteoarticular manifestations of candidiasis in young heroin addicts.

Another noteworthy publication of Drouhet's is, “Early experience with itraconazole in vitro and in patients: pharmacokinetic studies and clinical results” when itraconazole was considered a new antifungal agent. He also studied mycoses with AIDS patients and other immunocompromised patients.
