= Larry F. Grand =

American mycologist (1940–2013)

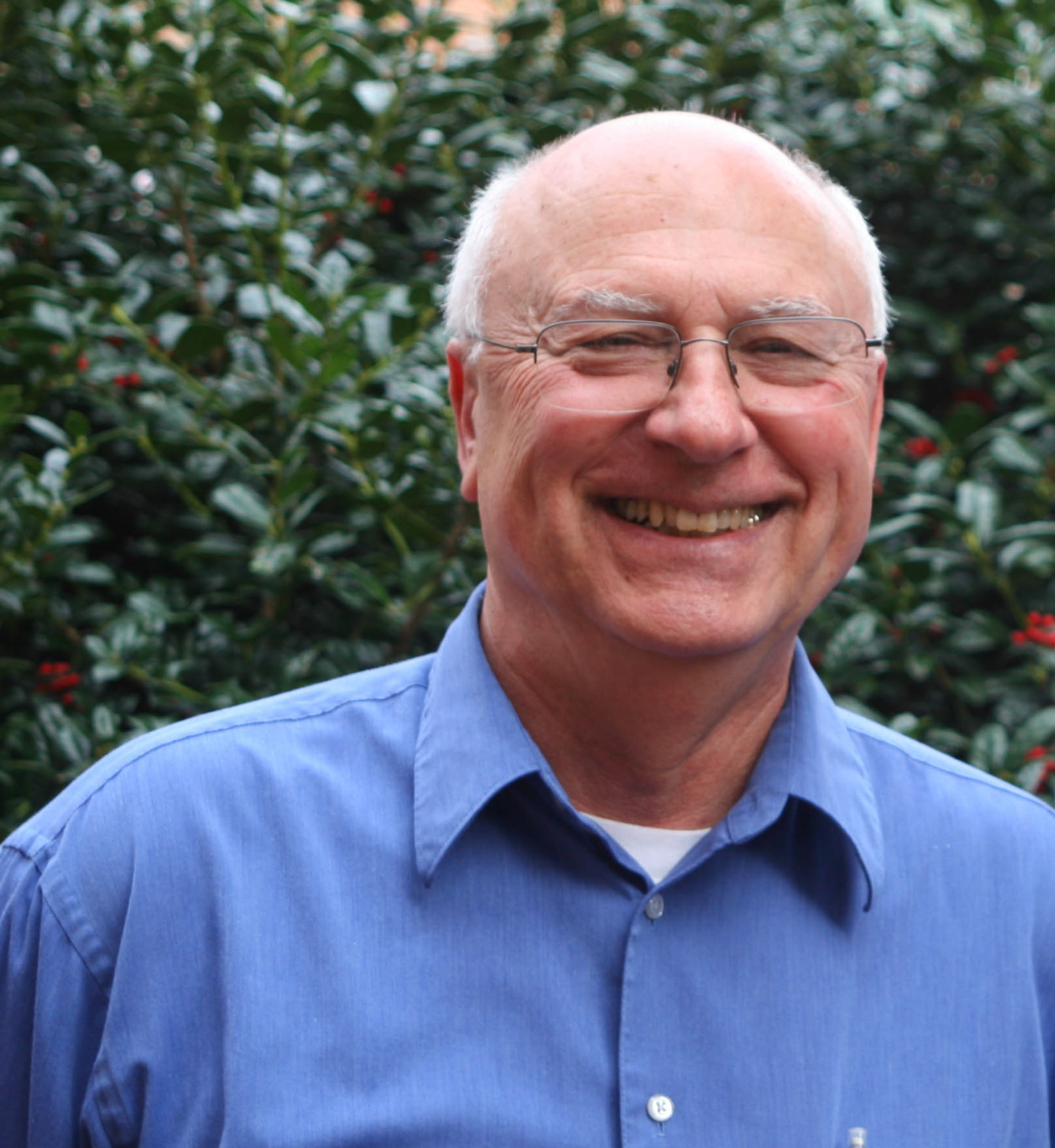
Dr Larry F Grand

Larry F. Grand (December 30, 1940 – March 14, 2013) was an American mycologist who had a long career focusing on ectomycorrhizal fungi, wood decay fungi and plant pathogenic fungi.

== Personal life ==
L.F. Grand was born in Lock Haven, Pennsylvania to Iona Grand and Frank O. Grand. Grand married Harriet Campbell in 1963 and went on to have three children and four grandchildren. He lived nearly his whole adult life in Raleigh, NC. Grand was an avid trout fisherman and passionate photographer.

== Education ==
Grand received his Bachelors and Masters of Science degrees from Pennsylvania State University in 1962 and 1964, respectively. Grand went on to complete his PhD under Jack Rogers at Washington State University (WSU) in 1967 where he worked with the ectomycorrhizal fungus genus Suillus and its association with conifers.

== Career ==
Upon completion of his PhD at WSU in 1967, Grand accepted a Forest Pathology position at North Carolina State University (NCSU) where he served in both the Department of Forestry and the Department of Plant Pathology. Grand taught Forest Pathology, Introduction to Mycology, and Kingdom Fungi, as well as the graduate courses Advanced Mycology, Colloquium and Plant Disease Diagnosis. Grand taught nearly 1500 undergraduate students and advised, co-advised and served as a committee member for nearly 50 students. Grand served as interim department head of Plant Pathology from 1990-1992, and retired after 45 years in 2012.

In addition to his teaching, Grand conducted research on a variety of mycological areas. Grand did research on ectomycorrhizal fungi on a wide variety of plants including conifers and ericaceous plants. His PhD work focused on the genus Suillus, which is an ectomycorrhizal fungus that associates with a variety of conifers. Grand did not describe many species, but he resurrected the name Suillus americanus var. reticulipes, which later was redacted to S. americanus. He did some research with ectomycorrhizae fungi associated with ericaceous hosts, which led to a patent for a method of lyophilizing ericoid mycorrhizae fungi for horticulture application. In addition, he studied the biology of ectomycorrhizal trees and the resiliency of trees when grown in suboptimal environments, such as high air pollutants. His passion was for wood decay fungi, and this was highlighted in his research on this group of fungi. Several projects were related to the biogeography of poroid wood decay fungi, and were in part possible due to his participation in the All Taxon Biodiversity Inventory Project of the Great Smoky Mountains. These projects resulted in expanding geographic distribution ranges, ecological niches, and hosts of numerous species of wood decay fungi. This research showed that North Carolina and the Southern Appalachia region is a center of biodiversity of wood decay fungi and a transition for temperate and subtropical species of wood decay fungi. Grand's work on wood decay fungi in this area was greatly important, and will continue to be cited as geographic ranges expand due to climate change. Grand served as the fungal inventory biologist for the North Carolina Parks Service. Lastly, he was involved with research that was related to plant pathogenic fungi, including work with powdery mildew on several hosts, Honeylocust canker, Fusiform rust, and Phytophthora root rot of Fraser Fir. Grand was highly published in journals to include Phytopathology, Mycologia, Mycotaxon and Plant Disease to name a few. He was author or coauthor of several cooperative extension documents and service reports.

== Larry F. Grand Mycological Herbarium ==
In 2011, the North Carolina State Mycological herbarium that Grand started in the 1970s was dedicated in his honor, and would henceforth be the "L.F. Grand Mycological Herbarium". The herbarium is a smaller herbarium relative to other, older herbaria, housing only 8,000 collections from mostly North Carolina, Tennessee, Georgia, South Carolina and Virginia. The collection consists of fungi with a wide range of ecological niches, but consists mostly of wood decay and plant pathogenic fungi. Although small, this herbarium has several interesting and rare collections. As a part of the National Science Foundation-funded All Taxon Biodiversity Inventory project of the Great Smoky Mountain National Park, the NCSU mycological herbarium served as the major repository for wood decay fungi from this project. Many of these collections were made by members of the North American Mycological Association and verified by L.F. Grand and others at NCSU. The herbarium has one of the largest powdery mildew collections from the Southeastern U.S., which include approximately 16 putative species on oak and a handful of collections of the rare sexual stage of dogwood powdery mildew fungus. The herbarium also houses a comprehensive collection of fungi from Nags Head Woods, which is the largest continuous maritime forest in the Eastern United States. This collection was made by Grand and others from 1996-2001, and consists primarily of wood decay fungi. Lastly, there are collections from the last existing natural longleaf pine ecosystem in North Carolina. The L.F. Grand Mycological Herbarium has been digitizing their collections as part of a NSF-funded project where it will continue to serve as a "Grand" mycological resource for the years to come.

== Awards ==
- Named NC State Alumni Distinguished Undergraduate Professor
- William H. Weston Award for Teaching Excellence from the Mycological Society of America in 1998
- The Excellence in Teaching Award from the America Phytopathological Society in 2002
