= Hillel Levine =

American social scientist, rabbi, and author

- Born: May 28, 1946 (age 80); Queens, New York City, U.S.

Academic background
- Education: Jewish Theological Seminary of America; The New School for Social Research; Harvard University
- Influences: Elie Wiesel, Abraham Joshua Heschel, Hannah Arendt, Erik Erikson, Peter L. Berger

Academic work
- Discipline: Sociology; theology
- Sub-discipline: Sociology of religion
- Institutions: Boston University; Yale University

Hillel Levine is an American social scientist, rabbi, and author. He was Professor of Religion at Boston University, where he served as the first director of the Center for Judaic Studies. In addition to books on Jewish history, he authored studies on social theory, comparative historical sociology, and the social epistemology of Judaism. He also served as deputy director for Museum Planning of the United States Holocaust Memorial Council, in which capacity he contributed to the preliminary planning of the United States Holocaust Memorial Museum.

== Early life and education ==
Levine was born on May 28, 1946, in Flushing, Queens. He studied with the rabbi and theologian Abraham Joshua Heschel, whom he called "my beloved teacher", at the Jewish Theological Seminary of America, where he received rabbinic ordination. He also studied with Hannah Arendt at the New School for Social Research, where he took a master's degree. In 1974, he earned a PhD in sociology and Jewish history at Harvard University, where he wrote a dissertation on Menachem Mendel Lefin, described in its title as "a case study of Judaism and modernization".

== Career ==
After receiving his PhD, Levine taught sociology and Jewish history at Yale University, where he founded a program in Judaic Studies. He taught at Yale until 1980, when he became deputy director for Museum Planning of the United States Holocaust Memorial Council in Washington, serving as preliminary planner of what would become the United States Holocaust Memorial Museum. Levine helped to shape the museum's approach to presenting the Holocaust to children by inviting the television host Fred Rogers to discuss recommendations with psychologists and teachers at a conference in 1982 that Levine organized in collaboration with the National Institute of Mental Health. In 1982, he became Professor of Religion at Boston University.

While conducting research in Poland in 1979, Levine discovered the Kronika of the movement of Jacob Frank, a text which the scholar Gershom Scholem thought had vanished, in an eighteenth-century manuscript that a local priest had recently sold to the Public Library in Lublin. The Israel Academy of Sciences and Humanities published Levine's translation of the text in 1984 as The Kronika: On Jacob Frank and the Frankist Movement. In 1991, Levine then published Economic Origins of Antisemitism: Poland and its Jews in the Early Modern Period with Yale University Press. In 1992, he published The Death of an American Jewish Community: A Tragedy of Good Intentions, co-authored with Boston Globe columnist Lawrence Harmon. Levine then traveled all over the world to conduct research in archives and conduct interviews to write a biography of Chiune Sugihara, a Japanese diplomat in Lithuania who helped thousands of Jews flee Europe during World War II. The book, In Search of Sugihara: The Elusive Japanese Diplomat Who Risked His Life to Rescue 10,000 Jews from the Holocaust, was published in 1996. The New York Review of Books praised Levine's "exhaustive research". Sugihara's family objected to some elements of the book, however, resulting in a lawsuit in Japan.

== Selected bibliography ==
- The Kronika: On Jacob Frank and the Frankist Movement. Jerusalem: Israel Academy of Sciences and Humanities. 1984.
- Economic Origins of Antisemitism: Poland and its Jews in the Early Modern Period. New Haven: Yale University Press. 1991. ISBN 9780300049879.
- The Death of an American Jewish Community: A Tragedy of Good Intentions. New York: Free Press. 1992. ISBN 9780029138656.
- In Search of Sugihara: The Elusive Japanese Diplomat Who Risked His Life to Rescue 10,000 Jews from the Holocaust. New York: Free Press. 1996. ISBN 9780684832517.
