= Libero Ajello =

American mycologist (1916–2004)

Libero Ajello

Libero Ajello (January 19, 1916 in New York City, New York — February 24, 2004) was an American mycologist. He cofounded and was first president of the International Society of Human and Animal Mycology (ISHAM). He was the head of the Division of Mycotic Diseases at the Communicable Disease Center (CDC), and editor of the ISHAM Journal Medical Mycology for several years. As one of the first researchers to investigate histoplasmosis and coccidioidomycosis in the United States, he and made valuable contributions to the comprehensive field of veterinary and human fungal disease diagnosis.

== Early life and education ==
Libero Ajello was born in New York City and raised in New Jersey. His parents emigrated to the United States from Petralia Sottana, a village in the province of Palermo, Sicily, Italy. He had a sister, Santa Ajello, and a brother, Vero Ajello. He studied medical mycology under Rhoda Benham and completed his Ph.D. at Columbia University in 1947 under J. S. Karling, a specialist in aquatic chytrids.

== Career ==
Before pursuing a doctorate at Columbia University, Ajello worked for the Armed Forces during World War II conducting a series of studies on tinea pedis, a skin infection of the feet caused by dermatophyte fungi. The increased incidence of fungal diseases during World War II drove the beginning of the investigation of thousands of serologic tests for the diagnosis of histoplasmosis, coccidioidomycosis, and blastomycosis by the Armed Forces. Shortly after the Communicable Disease Center (CDC) was founded in 1946, the federal government followed an epidemiological study of Histoplasm capsulatum, at the time under the direction of Michael L. Furcolow. As a result, the CDC became a valuable source of information about histoplasmosis, and other research groups were inspired to begin to unravel the epidemiology and different aspects of fungal infections. The government established the Kansas City Field Station as part of the CDC to study non-tuberculosis-related calcified pulmonary disease in the Mississippi-Ohio river valley area. Ajello joined the team of medical epidemiologists and was first sent to Duke University to establish a medical mycology unit. Two months later, the unit was moved to Atlanta, Georgia, and became the Division of Mycotic Diseases of the CDC. Ajello remained at the CDC for 43 years, leading a team of researchers. Under his guidance were Morris Gordon, Lucille K. Georg, Leo Kaufman, William Kaplan, and Arvind Padhye. Ajello and collaborators' discoveries about Coccidioides immits, the fungal agent responsible for Valley Fever, and Histoplasma capsulatum changed medical and public health practices throughout the world. In 1965, Ajello formed a committee with other mycological researchers, such as Campbell, Friedman, Milton Huppert, Levine, and Silva-Hutnerin, in Phoenix, Arizona, during the Second Coccidioidomycosis Symposium. The team led the creation of the Medical Mycological Society of the Americas, with Ajello as the first president. In 1969, the Rhoda Benham Award was established by ASM for individuals who contributed significantly to the development of medical mycology. Even after Ajello's retirement in September 1990 as director of the CDC's division of mycology, he continued to collaborate substantially with many research groups around the world.

=== Honors ===
Ajello was decorated by the government for his outstanding work at the CDC and contributions to public health in the United States.

== Personal life ==
Ajello was married to Gloria Ajello and had a son, Mark Ajello.

== Publications ==
In his more than 390 scientific publications, Ajello focused mainly on histoplasmosis, coccidioidomycosis and systemic fungal diseases, making important discoveries for the general aspects of these diseases. In the 1940s, Ajello worked on the nutritional requirements of dermatophytes and the morphological characteristics of Trichophyton mentagrophytes and Trichophyton rubrum. He studied the pigmentation and hair penetration of 40 isolates of T. mentagrophytes and T. rubrum and concluding that the different manner in which these two species attack hair in vitro is a diagnostic aid for their identification when correlated with morphology. In the 1950s, aiming to improve the identification of Coccidioides immits, he investigated different methods for pathogen isolation from soil and clinical samples, which often failed due to overgrowth of saprophytic fungi and bacteria. Also in 1950, he recruited Dr. Lucille K. Georg to his team to continue her work with dermatophytes and actinomycetes at the CDC. In 1967, Ajello and Cheng studied the morphology of T. mentagrophytes and named its perfect state, Arthroderma benhamiae, in honor of Benham, a previous researcher that investigated the fungi. Opportunistic infections caused by fungi in the United States began to be investigated in the 1970s. In 1973, Ajello isolated the new species Phialophora parasitica from a subcutaneous infection in a kidney transplant patient. The term phaeohyphomycosis was proposed by Ajello and collaborators as a collective name for mycoses caused by several species of phaeoid fungi when the etiologic agent was present as phaeoid pseudohyphae or hyphae (with no muriform cells).

=== Selected publications ===
- Georg LK, Ajello L, Gordon MA. "A selective medium for the isolation of Coccidioides immitis". Science 1951; 114: 387–389.
- Zeidberg LD, Ajello L, Dillon A, Runyon LC. "Isolation of Histoplasma capsulatum from soil". Am J Public Health 1952; 42: 930–935.
- Bauer H, Ajello L, Adams E, Hernandez DU. "Cerebral mucormycosis: pathogenesis of the disease; description of the fungus, Rhizopus oryzae, isolated from a fatal case". Am J Med 1955; 18: 822–831.
- Ajello L, Georg LK. "In vitro hair cultures for differentiating between atypical isolates of Trichophyton mentagrophytes and Trichophyton rubrum". Mycopathologia 1957; 8: 3–17.
- Denton, J. F., E. S. McDonough, L. Ajello, and R. J. Ausherman. "Isolation of Blastomyces dermatitidis from soil". Science 1961; 133:1126–1127.
- Georg, L. K., L. Ajello, L. Friedman, and S. A. Brinkman. "A new species of Microsporum pathogenic to man and animals". Sabouraudia 1962; 1:189–196.
- Ajello L, "Comparative ecology of respiratory mycotic disease agents". Bact. Rev., 1967; 31: 6-24.
- Ajello, L. "Chronological record of the Medical Mycological Society of the Americas’ Genesis". Bull. Med. Mycol. Soc. Am. 1968; 5:1–2.
- Ajello, L. "Establishment of the Rhoda Benham award". Bull. Med. Mycol. Soc. Am. 1969; 8:1–2.
- Aplan W, Application of the fluorescent antibody technique to the diagnosis and study of coccidioidomycosis. In: Ajello, L. Coccidioidomycosis, pp. 227– 231. ed. Univ. of Ariz. Press, Tucson.
- Ajello L. "Coccidioidomycosis and histoplasmosis. A review of their epidemiology and geographical distribution", 1971; 6; 45(3):221-30.
- Ajello L, Georg LK, Steigbigel RT, Wang CJ. "A case of phaeohyphomycosis caused by a new species of Phialophora". Mycologia 1974; 66: 490–498.
- Ajello L. "Milestones in the history of medical mycology: the dermatophytes". In: Iwata K, editor. Recent Advances in Medical and Veterinary Mycology, Proceedings of the Sixth Congress of the International Society for Human and Animal Mycology, 1977; Tokyo: University of Tokyo, 1977: 3–11.
- McGinnis MR, Padhye AA, Ajello L. Pseudallescheria Negroni et Fischer, 1943 and its later synonym Petriellidium Malloch, 1970. 1982; Mycotaxon 14: 94–102.
- Honbo S, Standard PG, Padhye AA, Ajello L, Kaufman L. "Antigenic relationships among Cladosporium species of medical importance". Sabouraudia 1984; 22: 301–310.
- Weeks RJ, Padhye AA, Ajello L. Histoplasma capsulatum variety farciminosum: a new combination for Histoplasma farciminosum. Mycologia 1985; 77: 964–970.
- McGinnis MR, Borelli D, Padhye AA, Ajello L. "Reclassification of Cladosporium bantianum in the genus Xylohypha". J Clin Microbiol 1986; 23: 1148–1151.
- Weitzman I, McGinnis M, Padhye AA, Ajello L. "The genus Arthroderma and its later synonym Nannizzia". Mycotaxon 1986; 25: 505–518.
- Arora DK, Ajello L, Mukerji KG, eds Handbook of Applied Mycology, Vol. 2: Humans, Animals, and Insects, 1st ed. New York: Marcel Dekker, Inc., 1991: 665–706.
- Chezzi, C. "Editorial, Dr. Libero Ajello". Eur. J. Epidemiol. 1992; 8:319–320.
- Ajello L. "Italian contributions to the history of general and medical mycology". Med Mycol 1998; 36 Suppl 1: 1–11.
- Ajello L, Hay RJ, Medical Mycology, Vol. 4, Topley & Wilson's Microbiology and Microbial Infections, 9th ed. London: Arnold, 1998: 595–615.
- Herr RA, Tarcha EJ, Taborda PR, Taylor JW, Ajello L, Mendonza L. Phylogenetic Analysis of Lacazia loboi Places This Previously Uncharacterized Pathogen within the Dimorphic Onygenales, 2001. Journal of Clinical Microbiology, p. 309–314.
