= John Errol Chandos Aberdeen =

Australian mycologist (1913–1996)

- Born: April 27, 1913; Gatton, Queensland, Australia
- Died: June 17, 1996 (aged 83); Brisbane, Australia
- Education: University of Queensland
- Scientific career
- Fields: Mycology, botany, plant pathology, agricultural science

John Errol Chandos Aberdeen (April 27, 1913 – June 17, 1996) was an Australian botanist, mycologist and agricultural scientist.

Amongst his family he was known as Errol but from his schooldays onwards he was known as Jack. In 1926 Aberdeen attended the Church of England Grammar School in Brisbane where his academic studies resulted in him being named Dux of the school in 1931. In Australia Dux is the title given to the highest ranking student in academic, sporting or artistic achievement in each graduating year and can lead to university scholarships, which it indeed did for Aberdeen. He was awarded a scholarship to the University of Queensland and whilst he no doubt achieved this merit based on his academic performance he was also an avid cricketer, rugby player and school tennis champion for several years.

In 1931 his family began farming in Manly, Brisbane which may have provided the encouragement necessary for him to study Agricultural Science at the University of Queensland. On 1 May 1936, he achieved a Bachelor of Agricultural Science with Honours and joined the Queensland Department of Agriculture and Stock where he was appointed to the Plant Pathology Branch and worked on vegetable diseases. The department was focused heavily on tackling pest and disease problems most likely to impact agricultural production in Queensland and Aberdeen contributed greatly towards this goal, especially with his work on tomato crops.

On 16 December 1941, shortly after the attack on Pearl Harbor Aberdeen enlisted in the Australian Army and was assigned to the 2/2nd Mobile Entomology Section where he worked on malaria control in New Guinea until the end of the war and was discharged on 10 December 1945, having achieved the rank of Major. On 6 March 1947, Major John Errol Chandos Aberdeen was mentioned in dispatches in the Commonwealth of Australia Gazette and London Gazette for distinguished services in the South-West Pacific area.

After the war Aberdeen returned to the Queensland Department of Agriculture and Stock and continued his research into tomato diseases. In 1948 he was appointed to a lectureship in the Department of Botany at the University of Queensland where he conducted research into rhizosphere fungi. On 5 May 1950, he was awarded the degree of Master of Agricultural Science and on 13 November 1958, he earned the award of Doctor of Philosophy for his work with fungi. Aberdeen resigned from this position in 1969 and joined the Queensland Agricultural College in Gatton as the head of the Department of Plant Industry.

In 1973 Aberdeen returned to the Department of Primary Industries where he continued his research into plant pathology. One of his duties in this position was liaising with the Queensland Police Service in their investigations of 'offences' related to the use of psychedelic mushrooms however after retiring in 1973 he pursued his pre-existing interest into the taxonomy of these fungi.

In 1958 Aberdeen collaborated with W.Jones to write the paper entitled 'A hallucinogenic toadstool' published in the Australian Journal of Science. They described the distribution of Psilocybe cubensis across the valleys of Queensland and New South Wales.

During his retirement Aberdeen published a number of books on the mushroom species found in Queensland and engaged with members of the Queensland Naturalists' Club to document species found in the region and describe new species of mushroom including Leucocoprinus austrofragilis.

== Selected publications ==
During his life Aberdeen authored a number of books and journals about fungi, mushrooms and plant diseases including:

- 1936. Sooty moulds: with special reference to specimens occurring in Queensland. University of Queensland.
- 1946. Experiments in the control of bacterial wilt of tomatoes in south-eastern Queensland. Queensland Journal of Agricultural Science.
- 1949. Investigations on the phytotoxicity of Bordeaux mixture (4.4.40) with special reference to tomatoes. University of Queensland.
- 1954. Can I eat that toadstool? Queensland Naturalist.
- 1955. Quantitative methods for estimating the distribution of soil fungi. University of Queensland.
- 1956. Factors influencing the distribution of the fungi on plant roots. University of Queensland.
- 1958. Quantitative studies on the effects of a number of factors which influence the distribution of fungi in soil and rhizospheres. University of Queensland.
- 1958. A hallucinogenic toadstool. Australian Journal of Science vol. 21:149.
- 1962. Notes on Australian Lepiota in the Kew Herbarium. Kew Bulletin. 16(1).
- 1974. Larger Fungi: Hobby and Research. Queensland Naturalist.
- 1976. Common Queensland Mushrooms. Queensland Agricultural Journal.
- 1979. An introduction to the mushrooms, toadstools and larger fungi of Queensland. Queensland Naturalists' Club.
- 1992. Lepiotoid genera (Agaricales) in South-Eastern Queensland.
