= Dimitrios Kontoyiannis =

Greek-American microbiologist (born 1963)

- Born: Dimitrios Kontoyiannis; 1963 (age 62–63); Athens, Greece
- Education: National and Kapodistrian University of Athens Medical School (MD, PhD(Hon.)); Harvard University(M.S.)
- Known for: Fungal Pathogenesis; Mucormycosis Aspergillosis Fusariosis; Candidiasis; Fungal resistance
- Awards: Drouhet Medal, ECMM (2015); Texas 4000 Distinguished Professorships (2017); Award of Excellence, ESCMID (2018); American Academy of Microbiology Fellow (2017); AAAS Fellow (2018); Rhoda Benham Award, MMSA (2019); Robert C Hickey Chair (2021); George K. Daikos Lifetime Achievement Award (2025); Distinguished Alumnus Award, Baylor College of Medicine (2025); Lifetime Achievement Award, ICHS (2026)
- Scientific career
- Fields: Microbiology; Mycology; Infectious Diseases; Infections in Cancer Patients
- Website: MD Anderson Cancer Center Faculty Webpage

Dimitrios P. Kontoyiannis is Professor and the Robert C Hickey Chair in Clinical Care and Deputy Head for Research in the Division of Internal Medicine at The University of Texas MD Anderson Cancer Center in Houston, Texas. He received his medical degree as valedictorian Summa Cum Laude from the National and Kapodistrian University of Athens, Greece. Kontoyiannis was trained in Internal Medicine at Baylor College of Medicine in Houston, where he served as a Chief Medical Resident. He was subsequently trained as a clinical fellow in Infectious Diseases at Massachusetts General Hospital and obtained a master's degree in Clinical Sciences from Harvard Medical School in Boston. He spent three years at the Whitehead Institute for Biomedical Sciences/Massachusetts Institute of Technology as a fellow in the Harvard MIT Clinical Investigators Training Program.

Kontoyiannis is considered among the one or two leading experts in mycology worldwide and among the first or second most highly cited investigators in the area of mycology with over 755 peer-reviewed publications, over 88,000 citations and an H index of 145. He is the recipient of many institutional, national, and international awards such as the 2004 American Society for Microbiology Award for Outstanding Research in the Pathogenesis of Microbial Diseases (mentor), The Billy Cooper Memorial award from The Medical Mycological Society of the Americas (2013), The Drouhet Medal from the European Confederation of Medical Mycology (2015), Littman award from the Mycology Society of NY (2016), emeritus member of Paul-Ehrlich-Society (2016), the 2025 George K Daikos Lifetime Achievement Award from the Hellenic Infectious Diseases Society, and the 2025 Baylor College of Medicine Distinguished Alumnus Award. Kontoyiannis was an American Society for Microbiology Distinguished Lecturer, 2014–2016, and was awarded an honorary PhD (Honoris Causa) from the National Kapodistrian University in Athens, Greece (2017) and from the Aristotle University in Thessaloniki, Greece (2020).

Kontoyiannis is a fellow of the American College of Physicians, Infectious Diseases Society of America, American Academy of Microbiology, European Society of Clinical Microbiology and Infectious Diseases (ESCMID), a fellow in Royal College of Physicians, and an inaugural lifetime fellow of the ECMM. He is a past member of the EFISG/ESCMID council. Kontoyiannis is the past president of the International Immunocompromised Host Society (ICHS) (2016–2018). Kontoyiannis is also a fellow of the American Association for the Advancement of Science and he is the recipient of Award for Excellence in Clinical Microbiology and Infectious Diseases of the European Society of Clinical Microbiology and Infectious Diseases for 2018. In 2018 he was elected as a member in class II–Medicine of the European Academy of Sciences and Arts. He is the 2019 recipient of the Rhoda Williams Benham Award from the Medical Mycological Society of the Americas (MMSA). He was elected in 2023 to the Association of American Physicians. He received the 2023 IDSA Citation Award from the Infectious Diseases Society of America and the Harriet P Dustan Award for Outstanding Work in Science as Related to Medicine, from the American College of Physicians for 2023-2024. In 2025 he received the Lucille Georg Award from the International Society for Human and Animal Mycology (ISHAM) and delivered the Joseph E. Smadel Lecture at IDWeek 2025. In 2026 he received the Lifetime Achievement Award from the International Immunocompromised Host Society and was a keynote lecturer at ESCMID Global in Munich. He was also inducted into the Kenneth I. Shine, M.D., Academy of Health Science Education of the University of Texas System and elected to the MD Anderson Hall of Fame for distinguished educators. Kontoyiannis is listed in the 1% of the most highly cited and influential researchers in the world. He is the leader of the ECMM Diamond Excellence in Mycology Center at MD Anderson Cancer Center, the only US center to receive such designation by ECMM. He is the past president of The Mycoses Study Group Education Consortium (2024–2026) and a founding member of the International Immunotherapy Society for Fungal Diseases (IISFD), where he serves as secretary/treasurer.
