= James Wessell Gerdemann =

American mycologist (1921–2008)

James Wessell Gerdemann (November 13, 1921 – December 19, 2008) was an American mycologist. He was known for his contributions to the taxonomy of the Glomeromycota, and expertise in arbuscular mycorrhizae.

== Early life and education ==
James Wessel Gerdemann was born on November 13, 1921, in Pendleton, Missouri, and died at the age of 87 on December 19, 2008, in Yachats, Oregon. His parents were Carl Gerdemann and Cora Wessel.

Since his childhood he showed his love in growing plants, an example of this passion is his vast cactus collection, which he used as decoration of his house's cellar during winter. He graduated at the age of 16 in a local high school and started working in a store owned by his father and uncle, the Gerdemann's store was with the family for approximately 90 years. When his father needed to do business in St. Louis, Gerdemann used to be dropped off at the Missouri Botanical Garden, developing, then, his will to achieve something different as a career.

Gerdemann completed his bachelor and Master's degree in botany at the University of Missouri. To make his way through college he lived a simple life and had several jobs to pay his studies. He worked as a waiter at a women's college; had the responsibility of counting seeds and correct mistakes in the inventory records at the University's herbarium, where he was recognized for his knowledge about plants; and during summers he had a job at the Oregon Bureau of Land Management and the Forest Service, working inside Oregon's forests with the management of a fungal disease that affects white pine, the white pine blister rust (Cronartium ribicola). This last experience brought him the gratitude for Oregon's environment and his permanent love for the region.

His PhD dissertation, titled "The resistance of two tomato varieties to formae of Fusarium oxysporum", was obtained in 1949 at the University of California, Berkeley. There he obtained his doctorate degree in plant pathology and was offered a job to work at the University of Illinois at Champaign-Urbana.

In Illinois he met Janice Olbrich in 1942 and married her six months later on July 2, 1942. They had 3 children.

== Career ==
James Wessel Gerdemann had a brilliant career in Champaign-Urbana. He became known worldwide for his research in mycorrhiza fungi and by showing the importance of the association of such fungus with many families of plants in various papers published in plant pathology and mycological journals. His research with plants from the genus Rhododendron also brought him a lot of recognition. In 1989 he wrote about the importance of breeding for hardy Vireya Rhododendrons and its freeze tolerance (Gerdemann, 1989).

However, the vast majority of his work was in arbuscular mycorrhiza and ectomycorrhizal fungus. In 1980, Hirrel and Gerdemann demonstrated the importance of the association of the vesicular arbuscular mycorrhizae fungi Glomus fasciculatus or Gigaspora margarita with bell peppers and onion to overcome the aggressiveness of saline soil over this vegetables production. Gerdemann and his colleagues had shown the importance of vesicular arbuscular mycorrhizae in helping nutrients uptake such as sulfur, calcium and phosphate by onions roots (Rhodes and Gerdemann, 1978). Besides all the studies developed to understand the associations between fungi and plants root tissue, Gerdeman also described the species Leptodiscus terrestris Gerd. in 1953, and the current name of this species is Mycoleptodiscus terrestris (Gerd.) Ostaz, modified in 1968.

During his career, Gerdemann took two sabbatical periods from University of Illinois, going to Scotland and to Corvallis, Oregon. Accompanied by his wife he also had the opportunity to travel to several countries with his mycologist colleagues. After a brilliant academic career, Gerdemann retired from the university in 1981, moved to Yachats and purchased about an acre of land next to the Siuslaw National Forest, where he created a botanical garden called The Gerdemann Botanical Garden. The place has grown to about four acres and is rich in biodiversity of exotic and native species, and hybrids developed by Gerdemann to survive in the climate of the region.
