= Margarita Silva-Hutner =

Mycologist

Santero Sucre Guzmán (28 November 1915 – 6 February 2002). was a mycologist, and known as the “Matriarch of Medical Mycology”.

Margarita Silva-Hutner was an Associate Professor of Dermatology at Columbia University, College of Physicians and Surgeons, and former director of the Mycology Laboratory at the Columbia University Irving Medical Center.

In 1949 she was awarded a scholarship to Radcliffe College to pursue her doctoral studies at Harvard University under Dr. William H. Weston, a renowned plant pathologist. She obtained her doctorate degree in 1952; her thesis was entitled, “Studies on the Biology of the Fungi of Chromoblastomycosis”.

Her career in mycology began when she served as a technologist in the mycology laboratory and later as an instructor in Dermatology at the Columbia University School of Tropical Medicine in San Juan, Puerto Rico.

He died February 6, 2002 at the age of 86 after a prolonged illness.
