= Edmund William Mason =

Edmund William Mason (1890, Greater London – 13 May 1975) OBE FLS was an English botanist and mycologist, noteworthy for his research on the taxonomy of hyphomycetes.

== Biography ==
Edmund William Mason was christened in Barking on 30 March 1890. After secondary education at Oundle School he matriculated at St John's College, Cambridge. There he graduated in 1912 with a degree in botany and later was awarded a diploma in agriculture. At the beginning of WWI, he became a commissioned officer in the Northumberland Fusiliers. In 1916 in the Battle of the Somme, he was severely wounded. Upon his recovery he spent the remainder of the war attached to the Durham Light Infantry. In 1919 he became a graduate student at the University of Birmingham, where he graduated with an M.Sc. in 1921. From 1921 to 1960 he was employed as a mycologist at the Imperial Bureau of Mycology, which was renamed in 1930 the Imperial Mycological Institute and in 1948 the Commonwealth Mycological Institute. He collaborated with Guy Richard Bisby for the academic year 1921–1922 and later after Bisby moved to England.

At the Commonwealth Mycological Institute, Mason's rearrangement of the herbarium established a new standard for mycological herbaria. He diligently collected mycological specimens in England and was usually accompanied in the field forays by his wife Una. E. W. Mason was elected a Fellow of the Linnean Society of London in 1931 and was awarded the Linnean Medal (shared with Frederick Stratten Russell) in 1961. For the British Mycological Society, E. W. Mason served as the president for one year from 1939 to 1940, and Una Mason (who died in 1974) served as the vice-president for one year from 1945 to 1946. He was also the president for one year from 1953 to 1954 for the Yorkshire Naturalists' Union. In their 1976 obituary for E. W. Mason, the mycologists Martin Beazor Ellis and Stanley John Hughes claimed that Mason "did as much for mycology as anybody in this century."

== Selected publications ==
- Mason, E. W. (1926). "On two species of Tolyposporium Woronin recorded on cultivated Sorghum". Transactions of the British Mycological Society. 11 (3–4): 264–286. abstract
- Mason, E. W. (1928). Annotated account of fungi received at the Imperial Bureau of Mycology. Annotated account of fungi received at the Imperial Bureau of Mycology; 43 pages; abstract
- Bisby, G. R.; Mason, E. W. (1940). "List of Pyrenomycetes recorded for Britain". Transactions of the British Mycological Society. 24 (2): 127–243. abstract
- Mason, E. W.; Ellis, M. B. (1953). "British species of Periconia". Mycological Papers. 56. Commonwealth Mycological Institute. ISBN 0000000426; 127 pages; title record
