= Martin Beazor Ellis =

- Born: 14 September 1911; Guernsey
- Died: 8 June 1996 (aged 84)
- Education: Chelsea Polytechnic
- Known for: Taxonomy of hyphomycetes
- Spouse: Janet Pamela "Pam" Morgan
- Scientific career
- Fields: Mycology
- Author abbrev. (botany): M.B.Ellis

Martin Beazor Ellis (14 September 1911, Guernsey – 8 June 1996) was a British mycologist, known as a leading expert on the taxonomy of pigmented hyphomycetes. He was the president of the British Mycological Society for the academic year 1973–1974.

== Biography ==
Martin B. Ellis was the younger brother of Theodore Ellis, who became a well-known naturalist with a focus on The Broads. The Ellis family originated in Great Yarmouth, relocated to Guernsey, and returned to England to settle in 1920 in Gorleston-on-Sea. Martin and Ted Ellis often worked together and were keen amateur naturalists in Guernsey and later in East Anglia. Martin's mother taught him to draw and paint in watercolours. After education at Great Yarmouth Grammar School, Martin Ellis worked for three years as an apprentice in Great Yarmouth and then matriculated in 1933 at the University of London but lived at home and travelled back and forth. He then studied at Norwich's University Technical College Norfolk and became a laboratory assistant there. He passed the qualifying examination in 1935 to gain an Inter B.Sc. qualification from the University of London. He then worked until 1936 at University Technical College Norfolk before moving to London and studying mycology and botany for 2 years at Chelsea Polytechnic (affiliated with the University of London). In 1938 he passed his final examinations with 1st class honours. After a year at Chelsea Polytechnic, where he worked as a botanical researcher, demonstrator, lecturer, and private academic coach, he enlisted in October 1939 in the Royal Army Medical Corps (RAMC). He was sent to British India and posted to the District Laboratory at Quetta, where he worked until 1942. Due to his contributions to research on Shigella, Ellis became a commissioned officer. He was given the rank of Captain and posted to Calcutta. There he created an inspection unit for medical stores and was made the officer in charge of the unit. After passing examinations in Urdu, he was transferred from the RAMC to the Indian Army Ordnance Corps. In August 1943 he was stationed to Lahore and put in charge of British India's largest inspection depot. During his army service from 1943 to 1945, he organized collecting forays or collected by himself. He travelled in the Punjab, Sind, Baluchistan, and Kashmir. He collected microfungi for himself and polypores for Sahay Ram Bose.

After the end of WW II, Ellis returned to England. At the Commonwealth Mycological Institute he held an appointment as Mycologist from 1946 to 1960 and as Principal Mycologist from 1960 to 1976, when he retired. His successor as Principal Mycologist was Brian Charles Sutton. At the institute, Ellis worked with Edmund William Mason (1890–1975), Stanley John Hughes (1918–2019), and Guy Richard Bisby (1889–1958).

In Chatham, Kent, in September 1948, Martin B. Ellis married Janet Pamela "Pam" Morgan. She graduated in 1940 with a degree in general science from the University of Reading and in 1946 with a Diploma in systematic mycology mentored by Charles Geddes Coull Chesters (1904–1993), a professor of botany at the University of Nottingham. She met Martin Ellis during collecting forays. They spent their honeymoon collecting fungi on the island of Guernsey and the results of their research was published in Report and Transaction of la Société Guernesiaise. Martin and Pam Ellis collaborated in mycological research until his death in 1996 and wrote several books together.

The two superbly illustrated books Dematiaceous Hyphomycetes (1971) and More Dematiaceous Hyphomycetes (1976), both published by the Commonwealth Mycological Institute, were based on a series of articles published in Mycological Papers. The two books have essential importance for the science of dematiaceous hyphomycetes (a diverse group of microfungi sometimes called black yeasts or black molds) in identification and taxonomy.

In retirement, Martin and Pam Ellis moved to Southwold in Suffolk, where they began collecting, describing and illustrating microfungi, especially from East Anglia. Their research was presented in three identification handbooks, Microfungi on Land Plants (1985),Microfungi on Miscellaneous Substrates (1988), and Fungi without Gills (1990). The three books were extremely useful for amateur mycologists in the UK and led to a huge increase in the number of species of fungi newly recorded in Suffolk.

More than 30 species names honour Martin Ellis with derivations from his surname. The genera Ellisembia Subram. and Martinellisia V. G. Rao & Varghese are also named in his honour. Martin Ellis communicated his enthusiasm for the study of fungi and appreciation of nature to many mycologists and gained wide esteem. The mycologists T. R. Nag Raj and Bryce Kendrick dedicated A Monograph of Cholera and Allied Genera with the laudatio "prince of a man and peerless mycologist, Dr. Martin B. Ellis". Upon his death he was survived by his widow and their sons. The Natural History Museum, London has some of the specimens collected by M. B. Ellis.

=== Books ===
- Ellis, N. B. (1972). Dematiaceous Hyphomycetes. Commonwealth Mycological Institute. abstract
- Ellis, M. B. (1976). More Dematiaceous Hyphomycetes. Commonwealth Mycological Institute; 506 pages
  - 1996 reprint. CABI. 1996. ISBN 0851983650. description at CABI Digital Library
- Ellis, M. B.; Ellis, J. Pamela (1985). Microfungi on Land Plants: An Identification Handbook. New York: Macmillan. ISBN 0029478901.
- Ellis, M. B.; Ellis, J. Pamela (1988). Microfungi on Miscellaneous Substrates: An Identification Handbook. Timber Press. ISBN 9780881921151.
- Ellis, M. B.; Ellis, J. Pamela (30 June 1990). Fungi Without Gills (Hymenomycetes and Gasteromycetes): An Identification Handbook. Springer. ISBN 9780412369704.
