= Dictionary of the Fungi =

Mycological reference work

- Editor: Paul M. Kirk; Paul F. Cannon; David W. Minter; Joost A. Stalpers
- Author: Geoffrey C. Ainsworth; Guy Richard Bisby
- Subject: Mycology
- Genre: Dictionary
- Publisher: CABI Publishing
- Publication date: 1943 (1st ed.); 2008 (10th ed.)
- Pages: 771 (10th ed.)
- ISBN: 978-0-85199-826-8

Dictionary of the Fungi (later published as Ainsworth & Bisby's Dictionary of the Fungi) is a multi-edition reference work in mycology. First published in 1943, it was compiled by Guy Richard Bisby and Geoffrey C. Ainsworth and revised through ten editions, with the tenth and most recent edition issued in 2008. The work compiles generic names and higher-level classification, defines terminology, and provides short entries on topics, people, and institutions in the study of fungi. Arranged alphabetically, it combines taxonomic entries with definitions, topical articles, and (from the sixth edition onwards) coverage of lichen-forming fungi. Later editions reflected advances in molecular phylogenetics, with the tenth edition adopting the consensus taxonomy from the Assembling the Fungal Tree of Life project; the editors also reorganised the volume into three internally defined sections, separating entries on the true fungi from those on chromistan and protozoan fungi-like organisms traditionally treated in mycology.

The Dictionary has been described by reviewers as an essential reference for working mycologists. Early reviews praised it as a practical, time-saving work suitable for both professional and amateur readers, and later assessments characterised it as a reference most mycologists needed to keep immediately accessible. At the same time, reviewers noted the difficulty of maintaining a compact reference work amid rapid taxonomic change, pointing to inconsistencies in treatment, rising costs, and the challenge of integrating new molecular evidence. The editors of the tenth edition suggested it might be the last printed version of the work.

== Publication and contents ==
The Dictionary is arranged as an alphabetical reference work combining entries on taxonomic names with definitions and topical articles. According to the tenth edition's User's Guide, the longest series of entries comprises generic names (accepted names and synonyms), compiled to the end of Index of Fungi 7(15) (January 2008). Compared with its predecessor, the tenth edition added about 500 entries, bringing the total to more than 21,000. Every accepted generic name is referred to a higher rank (family, order, class or phylum), with brief descriptions provided for those higher taxa.

Reviewing the tenth edition, Pam Catcheside wrote that generic entries provide (for each genus) the authority and date of publication, systematic position, number of accepted species, distribution, and key references. She added that, in keeping with earlier editions, the work aimed to be more than a set of lists by combining nomenclatural information with broader explanatory entries and topical material. Supplementary entries include a glossary, some English common names, names of fungal antibiotics and toxins, topical entries on ecology and distribution and applied mycology, and notes on mycologists and collections. The guide cautions that estimates of species numbers and distributions are often approximate and that users should verify details independently, particularly for groups that have not been revised recently.

== Authorship and editing ==
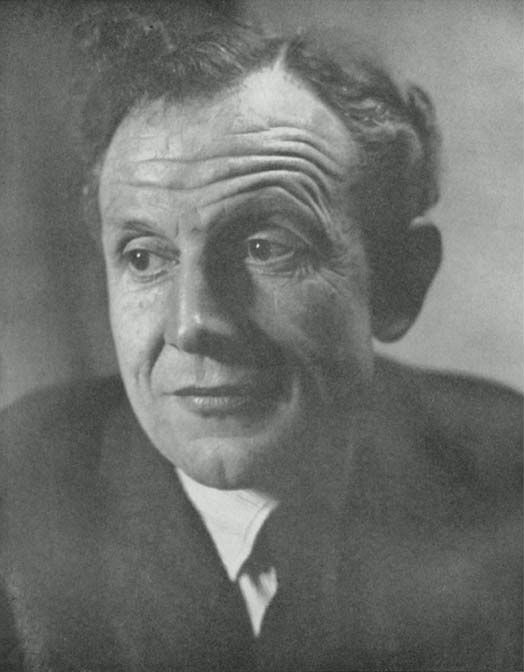
Geoffrey Ainsworth was one of the original compilers of the Dictionary.

In an obituary notice, Geoffrey C. Ainsworth described Guy Richard Bisby as an energetic compiler who "put much work" into successive editions of the Dictionary of the Fungi. Ainsworth noted that Bisby served as Senior Assistant Mycologist at the Commonwealth Mycological Institute at Kew, supervising production of the Index of Fungi for more than a decade. Reviewing the fifth edition, J. Webster stated that it was revised by Ainsworth with the aid of notes prepared by Bisby before his death in 1958. By the tenth edition (2008), editorship had passed to Paul M. Kirk, Paul F. Cannon, David W. Minter and Joost A. Stalpers.

== Edition history ==
=== First edition (1943) ===
The first edition, published in 1943, included an alphabetical list of fungal genera up to 1939, giving the order for each genus and an approximate account of species numbers and distribution. The first edition emerged during the Second World War, when Ainsworth and Bisby undertook nightly fire-watching duties at the then Imperial Mycological Institute at Kew and used the time to compile the Dictionary. It also included a glossary of mycological terms and keys to families of fungi. In Mycologia, Fred J. Seaver described the volume (359 pages with 138 figures) as a "great time saver" and recommended it to both professional and amateur mycologists. In the American Midland Naturalist, Theo Just called it a long-needed reference for mycologists and other biologists, noting its adherence to the International Rules of Botanical Nomenclature and its use of Basic English for most of the text. In Botanical Gazette, J. M. Beal summarised the edition as providing (in addition to the alphabetical compilation of genera) longer entries on general, ecological, applied, historical and systematic topics in mycology, with cross-references, a glossary of terms, and illustrative plates. In Nature, the reviewer compared the book to Willis's Dictionary of Flowering Plants and Ferns and wrote that it combined generic names with references to family placement and brief habitat notes. The same review said that the Dictionary provided explanations of technical terms but generally omitted their derivations, which could leave readers without much Latin or Greek unsure how particular terms were formed. The reviewer also noted that the text (apart from the appendix) was written in Basic English, but argued that the sheer quantity of specialised terminology reduced the simplicity that this might imply. Although the reviewer considered unevenness unavoidable in a compact work, they pointed to a specific example: the entry for Pyronema referred to a trichogyne but did not explain the corresponding male structure (the antheridium). The review's main criticism was that the Dictionary might revive technical words that were otherwise falling out of use.

=== Second edition (1945) ===
Reviewing the third edition, P. H. Gregory noted that a revised and greatly enlarged second edition followed the first edition in 1945. Leonel Mendoza and Dorothy McMeekin added that the second edition incorporated new genera and notes contributed by fifty mycologists.

=== Third edition (1950) ===
Reviewing the third edition, P. H. Gregory wrote that most mycologists (apart from extreme specialists) needed to keep the Dictionary immediately accessible, and that it served equally well as a glossary and guide to fungal classification and literature. Gregory stated that the third edition brought the work up to date, with a large proportion of entries revised. He described the volume as comprising an alphabetical dictionary (about 10,000 entries over 360 pages), followed by a systematic list of genera arranged under higher ranks and George Willard Martin's revised "Key to the Families of Fungi" (16 pages). Gregory noted that the book concluded with figures illustrating structural types and terminology, though he suggested that the illustrations could have made better use of the available space. He also argued that some major genera were treated too briefly and expressed the hope that a future edition would include lichens in both the dictionary and key.

=== Fourth edition (1954) ===
Reviewing the fourth edition in 1954, Martin wrote that earlier editions had already earned a place on the shelves of laboratories where fungi were seriously studied. He reported that remaining stock of the third edition (1950) had been destroyed in the winter floods of 1953 (a major flooding event affecting north-western Europe), prompting the publishers to update the work rather than reprint it from standing type. Martin wrote that the revision incorporated 525 additional generic names (including many the authors considered "doubtless unnecessary" but present in the literature) and brought nomenclature into line with changes arising from the International Code as adopted at Stockholm. He noted that the fourth edition ran to 475 pages (compared with 447 in the third edition). Martin concluded that there was no other work that could take its place for working mycologists.

=== Fifth edition (1961) ===
In New Phytologist, John Webster wrote that the fifth edition was revised by Ainsworth with the aid of notes prepared by Bisby before his death in 1958. Webster described the Dictionary as the Commonwealth Mycological Institute's best seller and stated that the edition followed the established pattern of earlier editions while adding much new material. In Mycologia, Clark Thomas Rogerson reported that more than 5,000 corrections or alterations had been made to the text of the fourth edition (1954). Rogerson wrote that much new material had been added, including about 500 additional generic names. He also noted that Martin revised his "Key to the families of fungi". Webster wrote that the Dictionary had been likened to a "mirror" intended to reflect the current state of mycological knowledge and practice and judged it an extremely useful, compact reference work in constant use. Webster also criticised inconsistencies in treatment, including uneven citation of key literature and non-uniform nomenclatural revision, while praising the newly prepared illustrations as an improvement over earlier editions. In Kew Bulletin, R. W. G. Dennis commented on the handling of lichenised fungi, stating that many illegitimate names were compiled but not the corresponding legitimate names, which affected the treatment of some groups in the non-lichenised Lecanorales.

=== Sixth edition (1971) ===
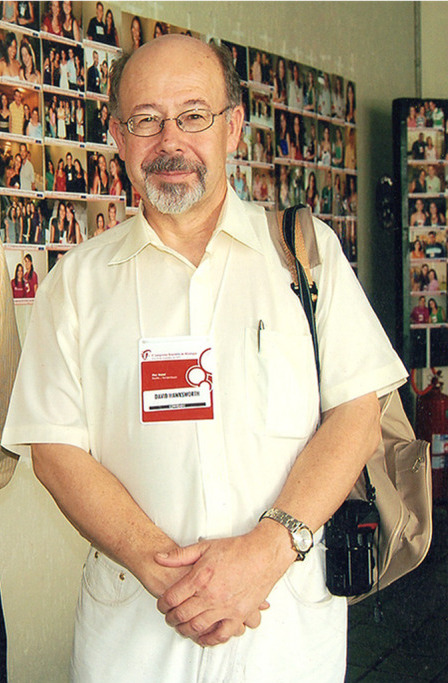
David Hawksworth contributed to the lichen coverage from the sixth edition and edited the eighth edition.

Reviewing the sixth edition, Rogerson described its appearance as a landmark in mycology and wrote that it reflected the decade of progress since the fifth edition (1961). Rogerson stated that the edition was completely revised and incorporated lichens for the first time, with entries prepared by Peter James and David Hawksworth. He summarised the Dictionary's core as a list of fungal and lichen generic names: for each accepted genus, it gave a systematic position, year of publication, distribution, and number of species, alongside definitions of terminology, short accounts of higher taxa, and references to recent works. Rogerson added that line drawings illustrated morphological features and that an additional plate of drawings had been added for lichens. He noted that the sixth edition did not include the "Systematic Arrangement of the Genera of Fungi" or Martin's "Key to the Families of Fungi" present in the fifth edition. In a spot-check of completeness and spelling, Rogerson reported that almost all of roughly 400 generic names absent from the fifth edition but described before 1970 were included in the sixth edition. Rogerson wrote that he found very few errors or omissions given the scale of the compilation.

A review in Taxon noted that the sixth edition was substantially larger than its predecessor (about 20% more pages) and considerably more expensive. The review explained that earlier editions had been printed from standing type—a procedure that reduced costs but constrained revision—and that after the fifth edition the type was dispersed, enabling more extensive rewriting. It reported that the edition's "taxonomic framework" followed Ainsworth's 1966 general-purpose classification and stated that the lichens were included and names of fungal metabolites were added. The same review described the Dictionary's extensive general entries as making it more than a compendium of names and terms. It also stated that the Dictionary treated Fungi as a separate kingdom in a Whittaker-style five-kingdom system and excluded bacteria while including myxomycetes and cellular slime moulds. Discussing the "numbers of fungi" entry, the review summarised estimates including 45,000 described fungal species and roughly 18,000 lichen species.

=== Seventh edition (1983) ===
Reviews of the seventh edition stated that it aimed to list and indicate the status of generic names applied to fungi (including lichen-formers) and to define mycological terminology, while also expanding major topics and concepts in brief articles and providing short biographical sketches of researchers. Hawksworth noted that Ainsworth's preface to the seventh edition described it as the first edition produced from a computerised database. William Culberson wrote that although the edition was shorter than the preceding edition, a double-column format and smaller type increased the total number of entries, and he welcomed the more complete integration of lichen-forming fungi into the general classification of fungi. In New Phytologist, R. F. O. Kemp reported that the list of generic names extended to the Index of Fungi (Vol. 5, Part 6; July 1983). In The Lichenologist, Jack Laundon wrote that the Dictionary was used mainly for looking up generic names in order to find their systematic position, rather than as a conventional dictionary for spelling or meanings. He described a major reform in the seventh edition as listing generic names from 1753 in line with recent changes to botanical nomenclature. Laundon summarised a typical generic entry as giving the author citation and date of publication, the systematic position (with a character code), an approximate number of species and their distribution, and principal references. He added that lichen genera were now assigned a systematic position rather than being referred simply to "Lichenes" as in the previous edition, but criticised the omission of the place of publication for generic names, which could make entries harder to check. He also noted that the edition was typeset by computer in double columns on an A5 page, with the text stored to facilitate later revisions.

=== Eighth edition (1995) ===
The eighth edition, edited by David Hawksworth, Paul Kirk, Brian Sutton and David Pegler, was described in reviews as a substantial expansion and update, with about 20,000 entries covering fungal generic names and a widening range of mycological topics. In Taxon, Rudolf Schmid noted that the edition was dedicated to Ainsworth on his 90th birthday and described it as a much-expanded volume with a larger page format designed to help the book lie flat. Schmid highlighted new features including entries for accepted families (with authorship and place of publication) and a revised classification reflecting molecular evidence. He also described a 44-page dichotomous key to recognised families and a synopsis of genera arranged by order and family, noting entries for major mycological collections with cross-references to their acronyms and updated figures placed beside relevant entries. Schmid added that although "including the lichens" had disappeared from the title, lichens (as lichen-forming fungi) were still covered. Reviewers also commented that the edition reflected the impact of molecular studies on higher-level classification and described the organisms traditionally studied by mycologists as spanning three kingdoms (Fungi, Chromista and Protozoa). Roy Watling and Alick Henrici described expanded and updated entries on terminology, techniques and applied topics, alongside other additions at the end of the main alphabetical section.

Reviewing the eighth edition in The Lichenologist, Brian J. Coppins described it as a thoroughly revised and expanded work rather than a minor update, noting an increase in entries from 16,500 in the seventh edition to 19,500 in the eighth. From a lichenological standpoint, he wrote that lichen names (first incorporated in the sixth edition) and lichenological terminology were now fully represented. Coppins noted that the Dictionary included an entry for the RIEC (Revised Index of Ecological Continuity) and the later NIEC (New Index of Ecological Continuity), suggesting that it covered organised lichen-biodiversity initiatives. He added, however, that some widely used names for lichen community types in phytosociology – such as Graphidion and Lobarion – did not have their own entries, even though the "phytosociology" entry directed readers to key references. He drew attention to several points of usage and terminology likely to matter to lichenologists (including "substrate" versus "substratum", and "epispore" versus "perispore") and noted a few omissions in term coverage. Coppins added that some treatments were conservative (for example, in how certain parmelioid genera were cross-referenced), but argued that inclusion of the taxa and pointers to the literature remained the central value of a reference work.

In Mycologia, Roy Halling noted that the preliminary matter included a list of contributors and acknowledgements and a list of 93 new entries treated in longer, encyclopaedic discussions under headings such as General, Ecology and Distribution, and Applied Mycology. Halling wrote that a User's Guide followed, outlining the main categories of entries and explaining conventions used in the dictionary. Halling questioned whether the systematic arrangement and family-level keys could realistically be used to identify an unknown fungus to genus, given the absence of character synopses and the large number of genera in some families. In Experimental Agriculture, John Malcolm Hirst characterised the Dictionary as a "household term" among those concerned with fungi and wrote that compilation of the eighth edition had been assisted by electronic information handling, noting that the editors acknowledged contributions from 55 collaborators.

=== Ninth edition (2001) ===
The ninth edition (2001), edited by P. M. Kirk, P. F. Cannon, J. C. David and J. A. Stalpers, was published by CABI Publishing and ran to 655 pages. In Mycopathologia, Leonel Mendoza and Dorothy McMeekin observed that the cover title omitted "Ainsworth & Bisby", although the internal title pages retained the earlier wording. They suggested that the change might foreshadow a shift in how future editions would be titled. Hawksworth remarked that use of the shortened cover title had led to the work being cited in reference lists without the "Ainsworth & Bisby's" form used on the title pages. Mendoza and McMeekin wrote that the ninth edition's central aim was to revise the classification of the Ascomycota and Basidiomycota by integrating traditional morphology with contemporary phylogenetic analysis. They noted reorganisations including a reduction in the number of basidiomycete orders and an effort to present sequenced anamorphs alongside their teleomorph counterparts. They also described the continuing inclusion of "fungal-like" eukaryotes (such as slime moulds and oomycetes) and discussed how molecular work had reshaped the placement of several of these groups relative to the true fungi. James Ginns wrote that the preface emphasised revision of the classifications of the Ascomycota and Basidiomycota and the integration of fungi lacking a sexual stage into the overall classification. He added that, for each of the nearly 4,000 anamorphic genus names, the Dictionary gives a phrase indicating placement (for example, Botrytis is entered as "anamorphic Botryotinia"). Ginns noted that this integration was not reflected in the "Systematic Arrangement" appendix, where anamorphic names were instead grouped in an alphabetical list.

Reviewing the ninth edition in The Lichenologist, Gintaras Kantvilas wrote that, despite the necessarily selective nature of the references cited, the citations provided generally offer an entry point into the literature for lichenologists working on particular genera or families. He considered the higher-level classification especially useful because it changes rapidly, and he suggested that the Dictionary's classification provides a practical benchmark for curators when filing herbarium collections systematically. Kantvilas also described the volume as a convenient "one-stop-shop" for lichenologists, pointing to the combined utility of taxonomic entries, glossary material and broader essays, and he recommended it as a personal reference for those without access to a comprehensive institutional library. He noted that the Dictionary acknowledged specialist contributions for lichenological groups, including coverage attributed to lichen specialists such as André Aptroot, Leif Tibell and Dagmar Triebel. At the same time, Kantvilas reported that the "Authors" entry now included the herbaria where major collections of taxonomic authors are located. He questioned some of the revised diversity figures given for lichen groups, remarking that large changes were sometimes presented without an obvious supporting reference and giving examples he regarded as implausible or erroneous. Kantvilas was also disappointed that the key to phyla and families had been deleted, arguing that it remained useful for general curators needing a provisional placement for otherwise unknown fungi.

Reviewing the edition in Mycological Research, Walter Gams wrote that it contained more than 20,500 entries and offered diagnoses for most families, orders and higher categories, alongside biographical notes, information on metabolites and mycotoxins, and broad coverage of pure and applied aspects of mycology. Gams attributed the ninth edition's appearance only six years after its predecessor to extensive computerisation, noting that coverage of new taxa extended roughly to early 2001. He reported that the 44 pages of family-level keys present in the eighth edition were omitted because they could not be updated, while a systematic arrangement of the fungi down to the generic level was provided on 87 pages. Gams also wrote that the edition revised higher-level classification to reflect DNA phylogenies and stated that the estimated number of named fungal species had risen to 80,060.

In The Mycologist, Bryce Kendrick wrote that the editors set out to revise the classification of the ascomycetes and basidiomycetes and to integrate anamorphic fungi into a classification of holomorphs. Kendrick wrote that the ninth edition made a substantial start by listing thousands of anamorph–holomorph connections throughout the text, while noting that molecular data were still incomplete. He also stated that the Dictionary treated not only groups long regarded as fungi, but also organisms newly incorporated (including Microsporidia) and some groups no longer considered fungi. Kendrick criticised the continued use of fungal-sounding names and endings for protozoan groups covered in the work.

=== Tenth edition (2008) ===
The tenth edition (2008), edited by Paul M. Kirk, Paul F. Cannon, David W. Minter and Joost A. Stalpers, was published by CABI Publishing and ran to 771 pages. Ashton wrote that the tenth edition restored the names of Ainsworth and Bisby on the first page, after their omission from the cover title of the ninth edition had drawn criticism from users. In The Quarterly Review of Biology, David J. McLaughlin wrote that the edition incorporated the consensus taxonomy emerging from the Assembling the Fungal Tree of Life project, providing a consistent higher-level classification based on monophyletic groups. McLaughlin added that the Dictionary separated the true fungi (Fungi) from chromistan and "protistan" ("more appropriately amoebozoan") fungi-like organisms placed in other eukaryotic kingdoms. He criticised uneven presentation in places, including unclear treatment of certain higher-level groupings and the integration of Microsporidia without the references provided for other generic entries. McLaughlin also suggested that an index to special topics would have helped readers locate the longer essays embedded within the alphabetical text. Despite these reservations, he concluded that the Dictionary remained essential, "now more than ever", as molecular analyses and environmental sampling continued to reveal fungal diversity.

In the preface to the tenth edition, the editors describe the Dictionary (then in its 65th year) as an entry point to accumulated knowledge in systematic mycology and state that it covers the organisms traditionally studied by mycologists, including lichens, mushrooms, slime moulds, water moulds and yeasts. They state that revision in this edition focused mainly on the higher-level classification of fungi, drawing on results from the Assembling the Fungal Tree of Life project. The editors write that they adopted the rank of subphylum alongside classes and subclasses. They explain that the work was reorganised into three parts: a Dictionary of the Fungi, a Dictionary of the chromistan/stramenopile fungi-like organisms, and a Dictionary of the protozoan fungi-like organisms. The editors acknowledge that many anamorph genera still could not be placed below subphylum level. They write that limited resources meant that the family-level keys remained omitted and invite users to send corrections. The editors suggested that the tenth edition might be the last "ink-on-paper" version of the work.

Ashton wrote that the editors coordinated contributions from 43 collaborators (compared with 31 for the ninth edition), drawn from multiple countries including the United States, Australia, South Africa, Sweden, Spain and the Netherlands. She characterised the volume as explicitly international in outlook, presenting entries from a global mycological perspective. Catcheside wrote that the main Dictionary of the Fungi was followed by shorter sections on chromistan and protozoan "fungal analogues", covering fungi-like organisms historically treated as fungi (including Phytophthora and slime moulds). She reported that identification keys were omitted because of limited resources and the difficulty of maintaining morphology-based keys when molecular characters were increasingly used in determination, and she noted that the "Systematic Arrangement" section present in the ninth edition was also omitted. Catcheside also wrote that the tenth edition increased its biographical coverage to include more mycologists from outside Europe, and she pointed to new or expanded topical entries (including climate change, genomics, and DNA sequencing and fingerprinting) with updated references.

== Reception ==
Reviews from the 1940s described the Dictionary as a practical, time-saving reference suitable for both professional and amateur mycologists. A contemporary notice in Nature praised the Dictionary as a convenient compilation but criticised uneven treatment in some entries and complained that it risked reviving obsolete technical terminology. Gregory wrote in 1950 that most mycologists needed to keep it immediately accessible and that it doubled as a glossary and guide to classification and literature. Martin wrote in 1954 that earlier editions had earned a place in laboratories where fungi were seriously studied and argued that there was no other work that could take its place for working mycologists. Rogerson described the fifth edition as remarkably complete and accurate, recommending that anyone interested in fungi keep a copy at hand. Dennis wrote in 1962 that few mycologists could imagine being without it. McLaughlin concluded in 2010 that the Dictionary remained an essential reference as molecular and environmental work continued to expand knowledge of fungal diversity.

At the same time, reviewers repeatedly noted the difficulty of maintaining a compact reference work amid rapid taxonomic change and uneven source material. Webster criticised inconsistency in treatment in the fifth edition, including uneven citation of key literature and non-uniform nomenclatural revision. Halling wrote that users should expect errors, omissions and differing taxonomic approaches and argued that wide use of the Dictionary made it important for information to be kept up to date and presented clearly. Gams regretted that the list price of the ninth edition was nearly three times that of its predecessor, suggesting that rising costs might push users towards overlapping internet databases; nonetheless, he argued that the Dictionary remained worth keeping at hand and improving through community feedback. Kendrick argued that retaining large numbers of archaic or abandoned names and obsolete terms diluted the work's most useful content and increased production costs; he suggested that such material could be moved to a public database. Kendrick also noted omissions and typographical inconsistencies, expressing hope that future versions would incorporate community-supplied corrections and eventually become freely available online. Ginns criticised some missing citations in individual entries, giving as examples the absence of Brodo, Sharnoff and Sharnoff's Lichens of North America in the lichen discussion and the absence of Ryvarden and Gilbertson's European Polypores under Polyporaceae.

Reviewing the tenth edition in Fungal Diversity, Kevin D. Hyde wrote that a spot-check of entries suggested that most had been updated, but he criticised the binding and wished that the edition contained more diagrams. McLaughlin pointed to gaps in presentation in the tenth edition and suggested that an index to special topics would have helped readers locate essays within the alphabetical text.
