= Monodictys castaneae =

Scientific classification
- Kingdom: Fungi
- Division: Ascomycota
- Class: incertae sedis
- Order: incertae sedis
- Family: incertae sedis
- Genus: Monodictys
- Species: M. castaneae

Binomial name
- Monodictys castaneae (Wallr.) S.Hughes

Synonyms
- List: Acrospeira macrosporoidea (Berk.) Wiltshire; Epochnium macrosporoideum Berk.; Hyphelia castaneae Wallr.; Stemphylium macrosporoideum (Berk.) Sacc.; Stemphylium macrosporoideum Berk.; Stemphylium macrosporoideum var. fuscescens Ferraris; Stemphylium macrosporoideum var. quercinum Sacc.; Stemphylium macrosporoideum var. roseum Fautrey; Stemphylium macrosporoideum var. spumarioides Penz.

Species of fungus

Monodictys castaneae is a species of dematiaceous hyphomycete fungus in the genus Monodictys (class Dothideomycetes). It is a saprobic, lignicolous species producing dark, muriform conidia on decaying wood and bark. The species was originally described by Karl Friedrich Wilhelm Wallroth and later transferred to Monodictys by S. J. Hughes.

== Description ==
Conidiophores are macronematous, mononematous, simple, short, and are brown to dark brown, arising directly from the substrate. Conidiogenous cells are integrated, terminal, and monotretic. Conidia are produced singly, dry, dark brown to black, thick-walled, broadly ellipsoid to obovoid, muriform (with both transverse and longitudinal septa), and typically with 3–7 transverse septa and several longitudinal septa. Conidia are rounded apices, truncate bases, and a roughened to verrucose surface.

== See also ==
- Black yeast ("dematiaceous")
- Saprotrophic nutrition
