= Physalospora perseae =

Scientific classification
- Kingdom: Fungi
- Division: Ascomycota
- Class: Sordariomycetes
- Order: Amphisphaeriales
- Family: Hyponectriaceae
- Genus: Physalospora
- Species: P. perseae

Binomial name
- Physalospora perseae Doidge (1923)

Species of fungus

Physalospora perseae is a fungal plant pathogen infecting avocados.
