= Samuel Paul Wiltshire =

English mycologist and phytopathologist (1891–1967)

Samuel Paul Wiltshire (13 March 1891, Burnham-on-Sea, Somerset – 13 May 1967) was an English mycologist and phytopathologist. For the academic year 1943–1944 he was the president of the British Mycological Society.

== Biography ==
He studied at the University of Bristol and Emmanuel College, Cambridge, where he graduated with an M.A. In 1914 he joined the staff of the Long Ashton Research Station and worked there briefly before leaving to do work related to WW I. In 1919 he returned as a mycologist employed by the Long Ashton Research Station and for a few years investigated fruit tree diseases caused by the apple and pear scab fungi. (Venturia inaequalis causes apple scab; Venturia pyrina causes pear scab.) In 1922 Edwin John Butler appointed him a staff member of the Imperial Bureau of Mycology (now called the International Mycological Institute). The Bureau's main function, which remained for decades the basic function of the Institute, was to publish a monthly abstracting journal entitled the Review of Applied Mycology. The abstracts provide coverage of the world literature on plant diseases. In 1922 Wiltshire married Violet Gertrude Scott, whose father was botanist Dukinfield Henry Scott, FRS.

From 1924 to 1939, S. P. Wiltshire was the assistant director of the Imperial Bureau of Mycology, which in 1930 became part of the Imperial Agricultural Bureaux and was renamed the Imperial Mycological Institute (IMI). From 1940 until his retirement in 1956 he was the director of the IMI, which in 1948 had its name changed from the Imperial Mycological Institute to the Commonwealth Mycological Institute.

Wiltshire gave the British Mycological Association's 1944 presidential address entitled The organization of the study of systematic mycology. As director, he initiated Mycological Papers, Phytopathological Papers, and the regular publication of the geographical distribution of plant diseases as shown on maps. He also initiated a second abstracting journal, the Review of Medical and Veterinary Mycology, the Index of Fungi (listing new names proposed for genera and species of fungi), and an annual (later semiannual) Bibliography of Systematic Mycology. His 1933 paper on Alternaria and his 1938 paper on Stemphylium are noteworthy.

== Selected publications ==
=== Articles ===
- Wiltshire, S. P. (1915). "Infection and immunity studies on the apple and pear scab fungi (Venturia inaequalis and V. purina)". Annals of Applied Biology. 1 (3–4): 335–350. doi:10.1111/j.1744-7348.1915.tb08000.x.
- —— (1921). "Studies on the apple canker fungus. I. Lear scar infection". Annals of Applied Biology. 8 (13): 182–192. doi:10.1111/j.1744-7348.1921.tb05545.x.
- —— (1922). "Studies on the apple canker fungus. II. Canker infection of apple trees through scab wounds". Annals of Applied Biology. 9 (3–4): 275–281. doi:10.1111/j.1744-7348.1922.tb05959.x.
- —— (1922). "The Michaelmas daisy disease". Annual Report for 1921, Agricultural & Horticultural Research Station, Long Ashton, Bristol: 74–76. abstract
- —— (1925). "The Wither-Tip Disease of Limes". Bulletin of Miscellaneous Information (Royal Botanic Gardens, Kew). 1925 (10): 401–403. doi:10.2307/4115100. JSTOR 4115100.
- —— (1929). "A Stemphylium Saltant of an Alternaria". Annals of Botany. 43 (172): 653–662. doi:10.1093/oxfordjournals.aob.a090194. JSTOR 43237865.
- —— (1930). "A method for the preservation of Petri dish cultures of fungi". Transactions of the British Mycological Society. 15 (1–2): 93–95. doi:10.1016/S0007-1536(30)80007-X. abstract
- —— (1931). "The correlation of weather conditions with outbreaks of Potato blight". Q. J. R. Meteorol. Soc. 57 (240): 304–316. Bibcode:1931QJRMS..57..304W. doi:10.1002/qj.49705724008. abstract
- —— (1932). "A Reversible Stemphylium-Alternaria Saltation". Annals of Botany. 46 (182): 343–351. doi:10.1093/oxfordjournals.aob.a090326. JSTOR 43237621.
- —— (1933). "The foundation species of Alternaria and Macrosporium". Transactions of the British Mycological Society. 18 (2): 135–160. doi:10.1016/S0007-1536(33)80003-9. abstract
- —— (1938). "The original and modern conceptions of Stemphylium". Transactions of the British Mycological Society. 21 (3–4): 211–239. doi:10.1016/S0007-1536(38)80024-3. abstract
- —— (1945). "Common names of virus diseases used in the Review of Applied Mycology". Review of Applied Mycology. 24: 513–544. abstract
- —— (1947). "Species of Alternaria on Brassicae". Mycological Papers. 20. 15 pages abstract
- —— (1947). "Danish Work on Alternaria and Stemphylium". Nature. 160 (4062): 313–314. doi:10.1038/160313b0. S2CID 116562350.
