= Physalospora abdita =

Scientific classification
- Domain: Eukaryota
- Kingdom: Fungi
- Division: Ascomycota
- Class: Sordariomycetes
- Order: Amphisphaeriales
- Family: Hyponectriaceae
- Genus: Physalospora
- Species: P. abdita

Binomial name
- Physalospora abdita (Berk. & M.A. Curtis) N.E. Stevens, (1942)

Species of fungus

Physalospora abdita is a fungal plant pathogen that causes cankers on, among other species, mangoes, persimmons, maples, alders, and oaks. It is a saprobe specifically on oaks and causes twig blights of persimmon.
