= Monodictys =

Scientific classification
- Kingdom: Fungi
- Division: Ascomycota
- Class: incertae sedis
- Order: incertae sedis
- Family: incertae sedis
- Genus: Monodictys; S.Hughes (1958)

Type species
- Monodictys putredinis (Wallr.) S.Hughes (1958)

Species
- See text

Genus of fungi

Monodictys is a genus of fungi of uncertain familial and ordinal placement in the class Ascomycetes. The genus was circumscribed by Welsh-born Canadian mycologist Stanley Hughes in 1956. He assigned Monodictys putredinis as the type species.

== Description ==
The genus Monodictys is characterized by its muriform conidia, which can be either partially or fully pigmented and are typically formed on slender conidiophores. Species from this genus predominantly inhabit leaves, flowers, and decaying wood, though they can also be found in air, oil, freshwater, and on human skin. Genera closely related in appearance to Monodictys include Hermatomyces, Pithomyces, Berkleasmium, Intercalarispora, and Canalisporium.

== Species ==
As of September 2023, Species Fungorum (in the Catalogue of Life) accepts 56 species of Monodictys.

- Monodictys abuensis (Chouhan & Panwar) V.Rao & de Hoog (1986)
- Monodictys anaptychiae (Lindau) D.Hawksw. (1975)
- Monodictys antillani R.F.Castañeda (1985)
- Monodictys antiqua (Corda) S.Hughes (1958)
- Monodictys arctica M.J.Day & Currah (2006)
- Monodictys arxanensis Y.M.Wu & T.Y.Zhang (2008)
- Monodictys asperospora (Cooke & Massee) M.B.Ellis (1971)
- Monodictys asterospora B.Sutton & Alcorn (1984)
- Monodictys austrina Tubaki (1965)
- Monodictys bicolorata R.F.Castañeda & Guarro (1997)
- Monodictys bogoriensis (Penz. & Sacc.) S.Hughes (1958)
- Monodictys bulbiliformis J.J.Xu & T.Y.Zhang (2017)
- Monodictys castaneae (Wallr.) S.Hughes (1958)
- Monodictys cellulosa S.Hughes (1958)
- Monodictys cerebriformis G.Z.Zhao & T.Y.Zhang (2004)
- Monodictys chlamydosporoidea H.M.Liu & T.Y.Zhang (2007)
- Monodictys cladoniae Brackel & Kukwa (2019)
- Monodictys clavata Y.M.Wu & T.Y.Zhang (2009)
- Monodictys cruciseptata J.L.Crane & Schokn. (1983)
- Monodictys desquamata K.Rodr., Figueras & Guarro (2001)
- Monodictys epilepraria Kukwa & Diederich (2005)
- Monodictys fluctuata (Tandon & Bilgrami) M.B.Ellis (1971)
- Monodictys fuliginosa Etayo (1996)
- Monodictys gemmipara V.Rao & de Hoog (1986)
- Monodictys glauca (Cooke & Harkn.) S.Hughes (1958)
- Monodictys huangheensis H.Q.Pan & T.Y.Zhang (2017)
- Monodictys indica K.Chowdhery & Rehill (1984)
- Monodictys levis (Wiltshire) S.Hughes (1958)
- Monodictys macrospora H.Q.Pan & T.Y.Zhang (2010)
- Monodictys melanocephaloides Goh & K.D.Hyde (1999)
- Monodictys melanopa (Ach.) M.B.Ellis (1976)
- Monodictys namatanaiensis Matsush. (1971)
- Monodictys nigra Matsush. (1975)
- Monodictys nigriglobulosa G.Z.Zhao & T.Y.Zhang (2007)
- Monodictys nitens (Schwein.) S.Hughes (1958)
- Monodictys oblongispora G.Z.Zhao & T.Y.Zhang (2004)
- Monodictys obscuriprimordiata Y.H.Yeh & R.Kirschner (2019)
- Monodictys pandani Matsush. (1985)
- Monodictys paradoxa (Corda) S.Hughes (1958)
- Monodictys parvispora R.F.Castañeda & W.B.Kendr. (1990)
- Monodictys peruviana Matsush. (1993)
- Monodictys phlyctidis R.C.Harris (2017)
- Monodictys putredinis (Wallr.) S.Hughes (1958)
- Monodictys qaidamensis H.F.Wang & T.Y.Zhang (2009)
- Monodictys sessilis Hol.-Jech. (1986)
- Monodictys shigatsensis Y.M.Wu & T.Y.Zhang (2009)
- Monodictys spinosa Mercado, Heredia & J.Mena (1995)
- Monodictys spiraeae Melnik & Shkarupa (1989)
- Monodictys striata (Petch) V.Rao & de Hoog (1986)
- Monodictys tibetensis Y.H.Geng & T.Y.Zhang (2011)
- Monodictys torulosa P.C.Misra & K.J.Srivast. (1979)
- Monodictys transversa G.Z.Zhao & T.Y.Zhang (2007)
- Monodictys trichocladiopsis Goh & K.D.Hyde (1999)
- Monodictys tuberculata Y.M.Wu & T.Y.Zhang (2009)
- Monodictys ucrainica (Kiril.) de Hoog & Grinb. (1975)
- Monodictys xiamenensis J.J.Xu & T.Y.Zhang (2017)

== See also ==
- List of Ascomycota genera incertae sedis
