= Guignardia camelliae =

Scientific classification
- Kingdom: Fungi
- Division: Ascomycota
- Class: Dothideomycetes
- Order: Botryosphaeriales
- Family: Botryosphaeriaceae
- Genus: Guignardia
- Species: G. camelliae

Binomial name
- Guignardia camelliae (Cooke) E.J. Butler ex Petch, (1923)

Species of fungus

Guignardia camelliae is a plant pathogen infecting tea. It has been observed in India, Sri Lanka, and Java.

== See also ==
- List of tea diseases
