= Sydney Francis Ashby =

British botanist (1874–1954)

Sydney Francis Ashby (31 December 1874 in Rock Ferry, Cheshire, UK – 6 March 1954 in Sussex) was a British mycologist and phytopathologist. He published on the genus Phytophthora.

== Biography ==
He was christened on 20 March 1875 in St Paul's Church, Tranmere. He had three sisters. His parents were Augustus Francis Ashby, an artist, and Priscilla Mary Ashby, the daughter of an officer in the Royal Navy. Sydney Francis Ashby studied at the University of Liverpool and then at the University of Edinburgh, where he graduated with a B.Sc. After his graduation he studied at the Martin Luther University of Halle-Wittenberg and the University of Göttingen and spent some time in Denmark studying bacteria that live in water. After his return to the UK, he became a Carnegie Research Fellow, working under Alfred Daniel Hall at the Rothamsted Experimental Station. From 1906 to 1910 and again from 1912 to February 1922 he was a microbiologist employed by the Department of Agriculture, Jamaica, which was part of the Imperial Agricultural Department for the West Indies. For some years, the director of Ashby's department was the chemist Herbert Henry Cousins (1893–1950). On 10 January 1910 Ashby married Caroline Louise Cork in Saint Catherine Parish, Jamaica. From 1910 to 1912 Ashby studied in London. His return to Jamaica in 1912 was in response to an outbreak among banana plants of Panama disease, a wilt disease caused by the fungus Fusarium oxysporum f. sp. cubense (Foc). In January 1912, Ashby published a valuable account concerning banana diseases and recommendations for the control of such diseases.

For around five years from 1921 to 1926, Ashby was a professor of mycology at the Imperial College of Tropical Agriculture, Trinidad. In April 1926 he returned to the UK to become a senior mycologist at the Imperial Bureau of Mycology (now called the International Mycological Institute). Upon the resignation of Sir Edwin John Butler in 1935, Ashby was appointed the director of the Imperial Mycological Institute (now called the International Mycological Institute). He held the directorship until his retirement in 1939.

Early in WWII, he and his wife suffered the loss of a son, who served in the RAF and was killed in his first operational flight as an observer. When Sydney Francis Ashby died in 1964, he was survived by his widow and one of their two sons.

Ashby's fungal specimens are stored at the International Mycological Institute. His botanical specimens are stored at the Tolson Museum in Huddersfield.

== Selected publications ==
=== Articles ===
- Ashby, Sydney Francis (1904). "CXVII.—The comparative nitrifying power of soils". Journal of the Chemical Society, Transactions. 85: 1158–1170. doi:10.1039/CT9048501158.
- Ashby, S. F. (1905). "Note on the Fate of Calcium Cyanamide in the Soil". The Journal of Agricultural Science. 1 (3): 358–360. doi:10.1017/S002185960000037X. S2CID 98024908.
- Ashby, S. F. (1905). "A Contribution to the Study of Factors affecting the Quality and Composition of Potatoes". The Journal of Agricultural Science. 1 (3): 347–357. doi:10.1017/S0021859600000368. S2CID 85795158.
- Ashby, S. F. (1907). "Some Observations on the Assimilation of Atmospheric Nitrogen by a Free Living Soil Organism.—Azotobacter Chroococcum of Beijerinck". The Journal of Agricultural Science. 2: 35–51. doi:10.1017/S0021859600000988. S2CID 84851634.
- Ashby, S. F. (1913). Banana Diseases. Kingston, Jamaica: Department of Agriculture, Jamaica, Government Printing Office.
- Ashby, S. F. (1917). "Leaf-bitten diseases of coconuts". Jamaica Agric. Soc., Kingston. 21 (7): 269–273. abstract
- Ashby, S. F. (1921). "Notes on two diseases of the coconut palm in Jamaica caused by fungi of the genus Phytophthora". West Indian Bulletin. 68: 61–73.
- Ashby, S. F. (1922). "Oospores in Cultures of Phytophthora faberi". Bulletin of Miscellaneous Information (Royal Botanic Gardens, Kew). 1922 (9): 257–262. doi:10.2307/4129946. JSTOR 4129946.
- Ashby, S. F. (1925). "The Perfect Form of Stilbum flavidum cke. In Pure Culture". Bulletin of Miscellaneous Information (Royal Botanic Gardens, Kew). 1925 (8): 325–328. doi:10.2307/4107442. JSTOR 4107442.
- "Bud-rots of the Coconut Palm in the West Indies by S. F. Ashby". Report, Imperial Botany Conference. 1925. pp. 153–158. abstract
- Ashby, S. F.; Nowell, W. (1926). "The Fungi of Stigmatomycosis". Annals of Botany. 40 (157): 69–83. doi:10.1093/oxfordjournals.aob.a090018. JSTOR 43237029.
- Ashby, S. F. (1927). "Bacterial Wilt Disease of Bananas". Bulletin of Miscellaneous Information (Royal Botanic Gardens, Kew). 1927 (1): 14–18. doi:10.2307/4107094. JSTOR 4107094.
- Ashby, Sydney Francis (1929). "The production of sexual organs in pure cultures of Phytophthora cinnamomi Rands and Blepharospora cambivora Petri" (PDF). Transactions of the British Mycological Society. 14 (3–4): 260–263. doi:10.1016/S0007-1536(29)80013-7.
- Ashby, S. F. (1929). "Further note on the production of sexual organs in paired cultures of species and strains of Phytophthora" (PDF). Transactions of the British Mycological Society. 14 (3–4): 254–260. doi:10.1016/S0007-1536(29)80012-5.
- Ashby, S. F. (1931). "Gloeosporium strains. Notes on thirty-two isolations of Gloeosporinm from Bananas in Trinidad". Tropical Agriculture. 8 (12). abstract
- "Quarantine and the spread of Sugar-Cane diseases by S. F. Ashby". Report of Proceedings, Imperial Sugar Cane Research Conference, January 1931, London. London: Empire Marketing Board. 1932. pp. 146–151. abstract
