= Physalospora disrupta =

Scientific classification
- Kingdom: Fungi
- Division: Ascomycota
- Class: Sordariomycetes
- Order: Amphisphaeriales
- Family: Hyponectriaceae
- Genus: Physalospora
- Species: P. disrupta

Binomial name
- Physalospora disrupta (Berk. & M.A. Curtis) Sacc., (1882)

Species of fungus

Physalospora disrupta is a plant pathogen infecting mangoes.
