= Apiothyrium =

Scientific classification
- Domain: Eukaryota
- Kingdom: Fungi
- Division: Ascomycota
- Class: Sordariomycetes
- Order: Amphisphaeriales
- Family: Hyponectriaceae
- Genus: Apiothyrium; Petr.

Type species
- Apiothyrium arcticum Petr.

Genus of fungi

Apiothyrium is a genus of fungi in the family Hyponectriaceae.

== Species ==
As accepted by Species Fungorum;

- Apiothyrium arcticum Petr. (1947)
- Apiothyrium tasmanicum H.J. Swart (1988)
