= Arwidssonia =

Scientific classification
- Domain: Eukaryota
- Kingdom: Fungi
- Division: Ascomycota
- Class: Sordariomycetes
- Order: Amphisphaeriales
- Family: Hyponectriaceae
- Genus: Arwidssonia; B. Erikss.

Type species
- Arwidssonia empetri (Rehm) B. Erikss.

Genus of fungi

Arwidssonia is a genus of fungi in the family Hyponectriaceae.

== Species ==
As accepted by Species Fungorum;

- Arwidssonia empetri (Rehm) B. Erikss. (1974)
- Arwidssonia loiseleuriae B. Erikss. (1974)
