= Guignardia philoprina =

Scientific classification
- Kingdom: Fungi
- Division: Ascomycota
- Class: Dothideomycetes
- Order: Botryosphaeriales
- Family: Botryosphaeriaceae
- Genus: Guignardia
- Species: G. philoprina

Binomial name
- Guignardia philoprina (Berk. & M.A. Curtis) Aa

Synonyms
- Botryosphaeria foliorum (Sacc.) Arx & E. Müll., (1954); Botryosphaeria philoprina (Berk. & M.A. Curtis) Arx & E. Müll., (1954); Botryosphaeria rhodorae (Cooke) M.E. Barr, (1970); Carlia ilicis Jacz., (1896); Discochora philoprina (Berk. & M.A. Curtis) Bissett, (1986); Guignardia ilicis (Jacz.) Schrantz, (1961); Guignardia rhodorae (Cooke) B.H. Davis, (1946); Laestadia ilicis (Jacz.) Sacc., (1895); Laestadia rhodorae (Cooke) Berl. & Voglino, (1886); Melanops foliicola (Sacc.) Petr., (1931); Phoma hysterella Peck & Cooke, (1878); Phoma hysteropsis (Peck & Cooke) Sacc. Physalospora gregaria var. foliorum Sacc., (1882); Physalospora ilicis (Schleich.) Sacc., (1891); Physalospora philoprina (Berk. & M.A. Curtis) Sacc. Sphaerella rhodorae (Cooke) Cooke; Sphaeria ilicis Schleich., in Ellis; Sphaeria philoprina Berk. & M.A. Curtis, (1859); Sphaeria rhodorae Cooke

Species of fungus

Guignardia philoprina is a plant pathogen that causes leaf spot on Araliaceae sp.
