= John Collier Frederick Hopkins =

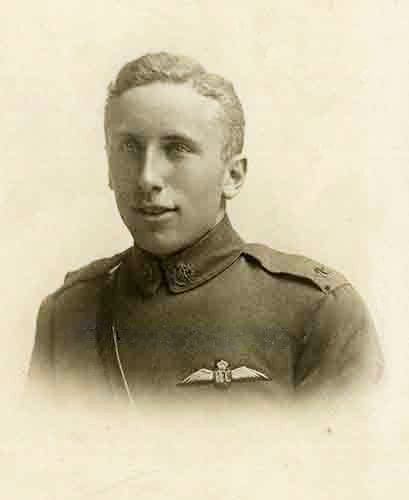
Royal Flying Corps, 1917

John Collier Frederick Hopkins (12 May 1898 in Stamford Hill, Greater London – 1 October 1981 in Maughold, Isle of Man) was a British mycologist. After serving in the Royal Air Force during World War I, he worked as a plant scientist in Africa for a number of years. He became the Chief Botanist of Southern Rhodesia (present day Zimbabwe) and later the Director of the Commonwealth Mycological Institute, London.

== Career ==
After having served in World War I and in the Royal Air Force, Hopkins won a Colonial Agricultural Scholarship and spent a year at the Imperial College of Tropical Agriculture in Trinidad.

Having worked for two years in Uganda as an agriculture officer, Hopkins was appointed in 1926 as mycologist in Southern Rhodesia, and from 1946 to 1954 as Chief Botanist and Plant Pathologist. He published numerous papers on the diseases afflicting tobacco and other crops.

In 1954, he returned to England as Assistant Director of the Commonwealth Mycological Institute, Kew and, two years later, he followed S.P. Wiltshire as Director. In 1963, he returned to Salisbury to attend the 3rd World Tobacco Scientific Congress arranged by the Tobacco Research Board of Rhodesia and Nyasaland.

On his retirement in 1964, he moved first to Hastings, and then to the Isle of Man where he assembled a collection of fungi. His Tobacco Diseases with Special Reference to Africa (1956) became the standard text on the subject. Hopkins' expertise was much sought after and in consequence he travelled widely.

== Awards and honours ==
In 1962 he was made a Companion of the Order of St Michael and St George.

== Personal life ==
Hopkins was the son of William Henry Hopkins and Edith Eliza Hopkins. He married Elizabeth Callister Rothnie (1914-1993) and they had a daughter called Evadne.

== Cited as ==
The standard author abbreviation J. C. F. Hopkins is used to indicate this person as the author when citing a botanical name.

== Works ==
- Hopkins, J. C. F. Tobacco Diseases with Special Reference to Africa (1956) Commonwealth Mycological Institute. Kew, Surrey. 1956.
