= Discosphaerina =

Scientific classification
- Kingdom: Fungi
- Division: Ascomycota
- Class: Dothideomycetes
- Order: Mycosphaerellales
- Family: Mycosphaerellaceae
- Genus: Discosphaerina; Höhn.

Type species
- Discosphaerina discophora Höhn.

Genus of fungi

Discosphaerina is a genus of fungi in the family Mycosphaerellaceae.

== Species ==
As accepted by Species Fungorum;

- Discosphaerina asperulae Petr. (1929)
- Discosphaerina circumtegens (Rostr.) M.E. Barr (1972)
- Discosphaerina cytisi (Fuckel) Sivan. (1984)
- Discosphaerina diapensiae (Rehm) Lar.N. Vassiljeva (1998)
- Discosphaerina discophora Höhn. (1917)
- Discosphaerina gentianae (Briard & Har.) Petr. (1924)
- Discosphaerina graminis (Lind) Lar.N. Vassiljeva (1998)
- Discosphaerina himalayensis (E. Müll.) Sivan. (1984)
- Discosphaerina insularis Petr. (1942)
- Discosphaerina lini Petr. (1927)
- Discosphaerina lonicerae (Dearn. & Barthol.) L. Holm, K. Holm & M.E. Barr (1999)
- Discosphaerina mirabilis (E. Müll.) Sivan. (1984)
- Discosphaerina niesslii (Kunze ex Rehm) L. Holm, K. Holm & M.E. Barr (1999)
- Discosphaerina nothofaginea Gamundí & Aramb. (1984)
- Discosphaerina scabiosae (Lambotte & Fautrey) Petr. (1924)
- Discosphaerina seriata Petr. (1927)
- Discosphaerina serratulae Petr. (1927)
- Discosphaerina sorbi L. Holm, K. Holm & M.E. Barr (1999)
- Discosphaerina stromatica (Fuckel) Petr. (1927)
- Discosphaerina umbelliferarum (Rabenh.) Petr. (1924)
- Discosphaerina vincetoxici (Fautrey) Petr. (1934)

Former species;

- D. boltoniae (Dearn. & Barthol.) M.E. Barr (1972) = Columnosphaeria boltoniae, Phyllostictaceae
- D. bulgarica Petr. (1929) = Guignardia bulgarica, Phyllostictaceae
- D. dioscoreae Petr. (1931) = Phyllosticta dioscoreae, Phyllostictaceae
- D. empetri (Rostr.) Lar.N. Vassiljeva (1998) = Physalospora empetri, Hyponectriaceae
- D. epilobii (Wallr.) Petr. (1940) = Guignardia epilobii, Phyllostictaceae
- D. euganea (Sacc.) Petr. (1953) = Columnosphaeria euganea, Phyllostictaceae
- D. fagi (H.J. Huds.) M.E. Barr (1972) = Columnosphaeria fagi, Phyllostictaceae
- D. franconica Petr. (1938) = Guignardia franconica, Phyllostictaceae
- D. fulvida (F.R. Sand.) Sivan. (1984) = Guignardia fulvida, Phyllostictaceae
- D. latemarensis (E. Müll.) Petr. (1958) = Guignardia latemarensis, Phyllostictaceae
- D. miribelii (Aa) Sivan. (1984) = Guignardia miribelii, Phyllostictaceae
- D. poterii Petr. (1955) = Guignardia poterii, Phyllostictaceae
- D. rosae (Auersw.) Petr. (1924) = Guignardia rosae, Phyllostictaceae
- D. tofieldiae (Tassi) M.E. Barr (1972) = Discochora tofieldiae, Phyllostictaceae
- D. xylostei (Reusser) Sivan. (1984) = Guignardia xylostei, Phyllostictaceae
