= Pellucida =

Scientific classification
- Kingdom: Fungi
- Division: Ascomycota
- Class: Sordariomycetes
- Order: Amphisphaeriales
- Family: Hyponectriaceae
- Genus: Pellucida; Dulym., Sivan., PF. Canon & Peerally

Type species
- Pellucida pendulina Dulym., Sivan., P.F. Cannon & Peerally

Genus of fungi

Pellucida is a genus of fungi in the family Hyponectriaceae. This is a monotypic genus, containing the single species Pellucida pendulina.
