= Xenothecium =

Scientific classification
- Domain: Eukaryota
- Kingdom: Fungi
- Division: Ascomycota
- Class: Sordariomycetes
- Order: Amphisphaeriales
- Family: Hyponectriaceae
- Genus: Xenothecium; Höhn.

Type species
- Xenothecium jodophilum Höhn.

Genus of fungi

Xenothecium is a genus of fungus in the family Hyponectriaceae. According to the 2007 Outline of Ascomycota, the placement in this family was uncertain, but it was confirmed in 2020. This is a monotypic genus, its only species being Xenothecium jodophilum. It was published by Franz Xaver Rudolf von Höhnel in Sber. Akad. Wiss. Wien, Math.-naturw. Kl., Abt. 1 vol.128 (7-8) on page 589 in 1919.
