= Léon Guignard =

French pharmacist and botanist (1852–1928)

Jean Louis Léon Guignard (13 April 1852 in Mont-sous-Vaudrey – 7 March 1928 in Paris) was a French pharmacist and botanist.

In 1882 he received his doctorate of sciences in Paris, and afterwards served as a professor of botany at the Faculty of Sciences of Lyon. In 1887, he succeeded Gaspard Adolphe Chatin as chair of botany at the Ecole Supérieure de Pharmacie in Paris. From 1900 to 1910 he was dean to the faculty of pharmacy.

In 1899 he was named president of the Académie des sciences. He was also a member of the Société de biologie (from 1888), the Académie de Médecine (from 1897) and the Académie d'Agriculture (from 1915). In 1920 he was chosen a commander in the Legion d'Honneur.

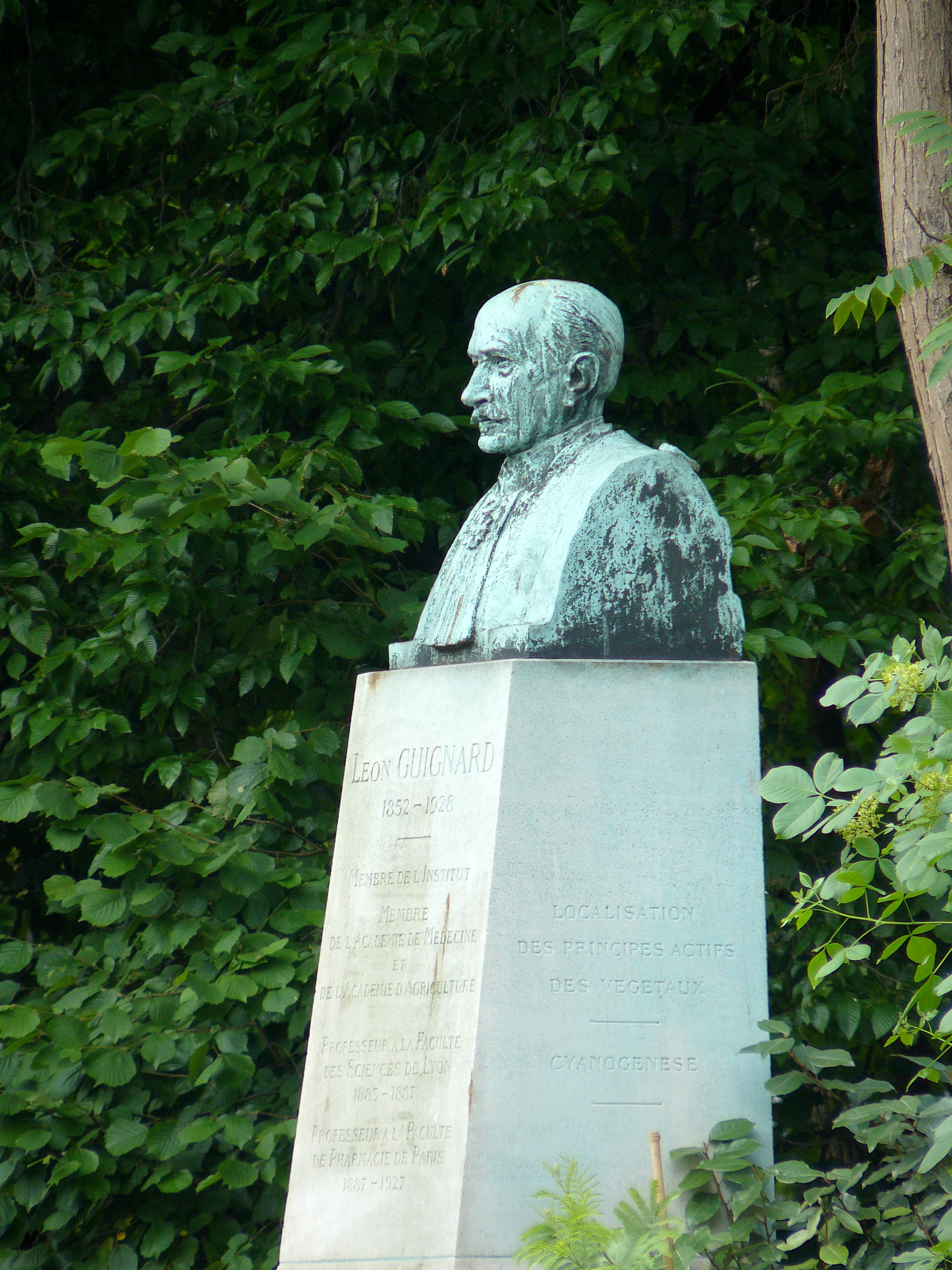
Bust of Léon Guignard at the botanical garden of the Faculté de Pharmacie in Paris

Along with biologist from Kyiv Sergei Navashin, he is credited as the co-discoverer of double fertilization in flowering plants. The two men made their discoveries independent of each other, Navashin in 1898 and Guignard in 1899. He also introduced a new method for detecting the presence of hydrocyanic acid in plants. In addition, he conducted significant research on the origin and structure of integuments for a large number of seeds.

In 1892, botanists Pierre Viala and Louis Etienne Ravaz published Guignardia,which is a genus of fungi in the family Botryosphaeriaceae and named in Guignard's honour.

== Selected works ==
- Recherches anatomiques et physiologiques sur l'embryogénie des légumineuses, 1881 – Anatomical and physiological research on the embryology of legumes.
- Recherches sur le sac embryonnaire des phanérogames angiospermes, 1882 – Research on the embryonic sac of angiosperms.
- Sur la division du noyau cellulaire chez les végétaux, 1883 – On the cell nucleus division in plants.
- Nouvelles observations sur la structure et la division du noyau cellulaire, 1884 – New observations on the structure and the division of the cell nucleus.
- Sur les organes reproducteurs des hybrides végétaux, 1886 – On the reproductive organs of plant hybrids.
- Sur les effets de la pollinisation chez les orchidées, 1886 – The effects of pollination in orchids.
- Observations sur l'appareil mucifère des Laminariacées, 1892 – On the muciferous apparatus in Laminariaceae.
- Recherches sur le développement de la graine et en particulier du tégument séminal, 1893 – Research on the development of seeds, in particular the seed coat.
- L'origine des sphères directrices, 1894 – The origin of director spheres.
- Les découvertes récentes sur la fécondation chez les végétaux angiospermes, 1899 – Recent discoveries on fertilization in angiosperms.
- Sur les anthérozoides et la double copulation sexuelle chez les végétaux angiospermes, 1899 – On antherozoids and double copulation in angiosperms.
- La double fécondation chez les renonculacées, 1901 – Double fertilization in buttercups.
- Sur la double fécondation chez les solanées et les gentiancées, 1901 – Double fertilization in Solanaceae and Gentianaceae.
- Le haricot a acide cyanhydrique (Phaseolus lunatus), 1906 – A bean containing hydrocyanic acid (Phaseolus lunatus).
- L'ovule chez les Apocynacées et Asclépiadacées, 1910 – The ovule in Apocynaceae and Asclepiadoideae.
