= Guignardia festiva =

Scientific classification
- Kingdom: Fungi
- Division: Ascomycota
- Class: Dothideomycetes
- Order: Botryosphaeriales
- Family: Botryosphaeriaceae
- Genus: Guignardia
- Species: G. festiva

Binomial name
- Guignardia festiva (Syd. & P.Syd.) Sacc. (1928)

Synonyms
- Laestadia festiva Syd. & P.Syd. (1912)

Fungal plant pathogen

Guignardia festiva is a plant pathogen that has been recorded on Sumbaviopsis albicans.
