= Hyponectria =

Scientific classification
- Kingdom: Fungi
- Division: Ascomycota
- Class: Sordariomycetes
- Order: Amphisphaeriales
- Family: Sporocadaceae
- Genus: Hyponectria; Sacc.

Type species
- Hyponectria buxi (DC.) Sacc.

Genus of fungi

Hyponectria is a genus of fungi in the family Hyponectriaceae.

== Species ==
As accepted by Species Fungorum;

- Hyponectria acaciae Sivan. & R.G. Shivas (2002)
- Hyponectria auripuncta (Harkn.) M.E. Barr (1977)
- Hyponectria betulina M.E. Barr (1977)
- Hyponectria biparasitica Höhn. (1918)
- Hyponectria buxi (Alb. & Schwein.) Sacc. (1878)
- Hyponectria cacti (Ellis & Everh.) Seaver (1909)
- Hyponectria contecta (Desm.) Höhn. (1917)
- Hyponectria cookeana (Auersw.) M.E. Barr (1976)
- Hyponectria cooperta (Desm.) M.E. Barr (1977)
- Hyponectria depressa (Peck) M.E. Barr (1977)
- Hyponectria dicalycis Katum. (1981)
- Hyponectria embeliae Petch (1917)
- Hyponectria eugeniae Petch (1926)
- Hyponectria flavonitens Sacc. & Speg. (1878)
- Hyponectria fusispora M.E. Barr (1993)
- Hyponectria gossypii (Schwein.) Sacc. (1883)
- Hyponectria gregaria M.E. Barr (1977)
- Hyponectria grevilleae Z.Q. Yuan & M.E. Barr (1996)
- Hyponectria jucunda (Mont.) Weese (1910)
- Hyponectria magnoliae (Schwein.) M.E. Barr (1977)
- Hyponectria mohavensis Bonar (1965)
- Hyponectria oxystomella G.C. Zhao & R.L. Zhao (2012)
- Hyponectria pandani Racib. (1900)
- Hyponectria penzigiana Sacc. (1891)
- Hyponectria populi (G.E. Thomps.) M.E. Barr (1977)
- Hyponectria raciborskii Penz. & Sacc. (1898)
- Hyponectria rhododendri Rehm (1907)
- Hyponectria rubescens (Ellis & Everh.) M.E. Barr (1977)
- Hyponectria sinensis Sacc. (1921)
- Hyponectria syzygii Z.Q. Yuan & M.E. Barr (1996)

Former species;

- H. adenostomatis (Farl.) P.F. Cannon (1996) = Polystigma adenostomatis, Phyllachoraceae
- H. astragali (Lasch ex Rabenh.) Lar.N. Vassiljeva (1998) = Stigmatula astragali, Phyllachoraceae
- H. australis (Sacc. & Speg.) Cooke (1884) = Cesatiella australis, Hyponectriaceae
- H. consolationis (Sacc.) Cooke (1884) = Nectriella consolationis, Bionectriaceae
- H. dakotensis Seaver (1909) = Nectriella dakotensis, Bionectriaceae
- H. dubitationum (Speg.) Cooke (1884) = Passerinula dubitationum, Dothideomycetes
- H. lonicerae (Dearn. & Barthol.) M.E. Barr (1977) = Discosphaerina lonicerae, Hyponectriaceae
- H. memecyli Petch (1917) = Plectosphaera memecyli, Xylariaceae
- H. onobrychidis Săvul. & Rayss (1935) = Stigmatula astragali, Phyllachoraceae
- H. phaseoli F. Stevens (1920) = Phyllachora dolichogena, Phyllachoraceae
- H. physocarpi (Jacz.) Lar.N. Vassiljeva (1998) = Phyllachora physocarpi, Phyllachoraceae
- H. queletii P. Karst. (1882) = Nectriopsis queletii, Bionectriaceae
- H. sceptri (P. Karst.) Samuels, Rogerson, Rossman & J.D. Sm. (1984) = Charonectria sceptri, Bionectriaceae
- H. succinea (Roberge ex Desm.) Cooke (1884) = Leiosphaerella succinea, Pseudomassariaceae
- H. sutherlandiae (Kalchbr. & Cooke) Theiss. (1919) = Stigmatula sutherlandiae, Phyllachoraceae
- H. therophila (Desm.) Lar.N. Vassiljeva (1987) = Phyllachora therophila, Phyllachoraceae
- H. volkartiana Rehm (1907) = Polystigma volkartianum, Phyllachoraceae
