= Arecomyces =

Scientific classification
- Domain: Eukaryota
- Kingdom: Fungi
- Division: Ascomycota
- Class: Sordariomycetes
- Order: Amphisphaeriales
- Family: Hyponectriaceae
- Genus: Arecomyces; K.D. Hyde

Type species
- Arecomyces frondicola K.D. Hyde

Genus of fungi

Arecomyces is a genus of fungi in the family Hyponectriaceae.

== Species ==
As accepted by Species Fungorum;

- Arecomyces attaleae Vitória & J.L. Bezerra (2011)
- Arecomyces bruneiensis K.D. Hyde (1996)
- Arecomyces calami K.D. Hyde & J. Fröhl. (2003)
- Arecomyces dicksonii K.D. Hyde (1996)
- Arecomyces epigenus K.D. Hyde (1996)
- Arecomyces frondicola K.D. Hyde (1996)
- Arecomyces hedgeri K.D. Hyde (1996)
- Arecomyces licualae K.D. Hyde & J. Fröhl. (2003)
- Arecomyces sekoyae K.D. Hyde (1996)
- Arecomyces tetrasporus K.D. Hyde (1996)
