= Cesatiella =

Scientific classification
- Kingdom: Fungi
- Division: Ascomycota
- Class: Sordariomycetes
- Order: Amphisphaeriales
- Family: Hyponectriaceae
- Genus: Cesatiella; Sacc.

Type species
- Cesatiella australis Sacc. & Speg.

Genus of fungi

Cesatiella is a genus of fungi in the family Hyponectriaceae.

The genus name of Cesatiella is in honour of Vincenzo Barone di Cesati (1806 - 1883), an Italian botanist and Professor of Botany and Director of the Botanical Garden of Naples, Italy.

The genus was circumscribed by Pier Andrea Saccardo in Michelia Vol.1 (Issue 2) on page 250 in 1878.

== Species ==
As accepted by Species Fungorum;

- Cesatiella australis Sacc. & Speg. (1878)
- Cesatiella lancastriensis Grove (1930)
- Cesatiella rehmiana Höhn. (1904)

Former species; C. polyblasta (Romell & Sacc.) Höhn. (1905) = Phragmocalosphaeria polyblasta, Calosphaeriaceae
