= Physalospora =

Scientific classification
- Domain: Eukaryota
- Kingdom: Fungi
- Division: Ascomycota
- Class: Sordariomycetes
- Order: Amphisphaeriales
- Family: Hyponectriaceae
- Genus: Physalospora; Niessl (1876)

Type species
- Physalospora alpestris Niessl

Species
- 36

Genus of fungi

Physalospora is a genus of fungi in the family Hyponectriaceae. The genus is estimated to contain about 36 species that grow on dead leaves. Often confused with Botryosphaeria, Physalospora is probably polyphyletic.

== Species ==
- Physalospora abdita
- Physalospora alpestris
- Physalospora anamalaiensis
- Physalospora aquatica
- Physalospora arctostaphyli
- Physalospora corni
- Physalospora disrupta
- Physalospora empetri
- Physalospora ephedrae
- Physalospora eucalypti
- Physalospora euphorbiae
- Physalospora lonicerae
- Physalospora perseae
- Physalospora prasiolae
- Physalospora rhododendri
- Physalospora scirpi
- Physalospora vaccinii
- Physalospora vitis-idaeae
