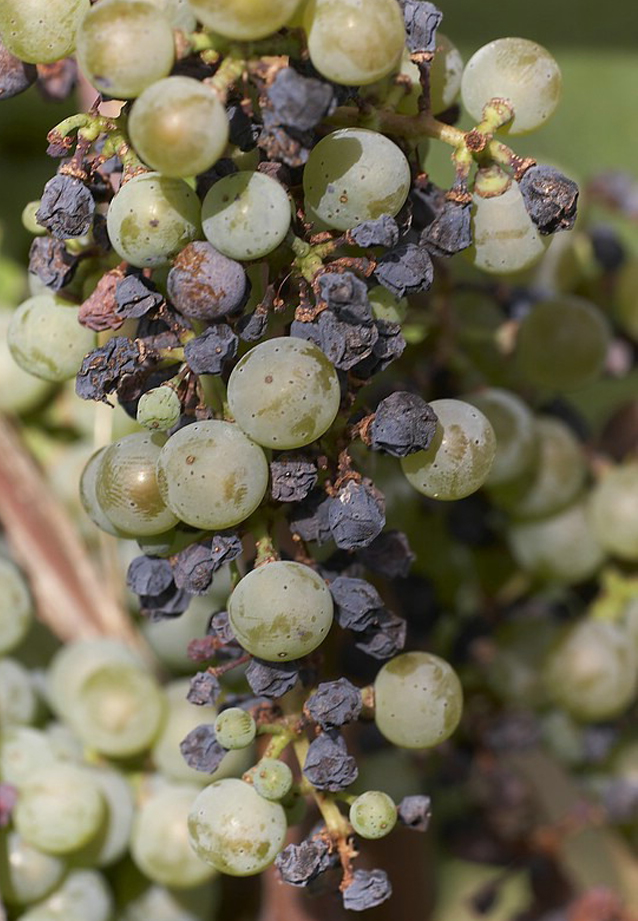
- Guignardia bidwellii on grapes

Scientific classification
- Kingdom: Fungi
- Division: Ascomycota
- Class: Dothideomycetes
- Order: Botryosphaeriales
- Family: Botryosphaeriaceae
- Genus: Guignardia; Viala & Ravaz

Species
- Guignardia bidwellii; Guignardia camelliae; Guignardia citricarpa; Guignardia festiva; Guignardia fulvida; Guignardia mangiferae; Guignardia musae; Guignardia philoprina. . .

= Guignardia =

Genus of fungi

Guignardia is a genus of fungi in the family Botryosphaeriaceae.

The genus name of Guignardia is in honour of Jean Louis Léon Guignard (1852–1928), who was a French pharmacist and botanist.

The genus was circumscribed by Pierre Viala and Louis Etienne Ravaz in Bull. Soc. Mycol. France vol.8, issue 63 on page 177 in 1892.

== Species ==
- Guignardia abeana
- Guignardia abietella-sibirica
- Guignardia acaciae
- Guignardia adeana
- Guignardia adianti
- Guignardia adriatica
- Guignardia aegyptiaca
- Guignardia aesculi
- Guignardia agerati
- Guignardia ahlesiana
- Guignardia ailanthi
- Guignardia aleuritis
- Guignardia alhagi
- Guignardia allamandae
- Guignardia alliacea
- Guignardia alnigena
- Guignardia alternantherae
- Guignardia alyxiae
- Guignardia amomi
- Guignardia anthurii
- Guignardia aphyllanthis
- Guignardia apiahyna
- Guignardia apocyni
- Guignardia arachidis
- Guignardia araliae
- Guignardia araucariae
- Guignardia ardisiae
- Guignardia arengae
- Guignardia asparagi
- Guignardia astragali
- Guignardia atropurpurea
- Guignardia aurangabadensis
- Guignardia bambusae
- Guignardia bambusella
- Guignardia bambusina
- Guignardia betulae
- Guignardia bidwellii
- Guignardia biennis
- Guignardia boltoniae
- Guignardia bulgarica
- Guignardia bumeliae
- Guignardia buxicola
- Guignardia cabelludae
- Guignardia cahirensis
- Guignardia calami
- Guignardia cambucae
- Guignardia camelliae
- Guignardia canavaliae
- Guignardia candeloflamma
- Guignardia capsici
- Guignardia caricae
- Guignardia caricicola
- Guignardia caricis
- Guignardia caryophyllea
- Guignardia castanopsidis
- Guignardia cephalanthae
- Guignardia cephalotaxi-nanae
- Guignardia chandrapurensis
- Guignardia chondri
- Guignardia cinchonae
- Guignardia cirsii
- Guignardia citricarpa
- Guignardia clematidis
- Guignardia clusiae
- Guignardia cocoës
- Guignardia cocogena
- Guignardia cocoicola
- Guignardia codiaei
- Guignardia coffeae
- Guignardia concinna
- Guignardia convolvuli
- Guignardia coronillae
- Guignardia creberrima
- Guignardia crepidis
- Guignardia cryptomeriae
- Guignardia cussoniae
- Guignardia cyperi
- Guignardia depressa
- Guignardia diapensiae
- Guignardia dieffenbachiae
- Guignardia diffusa
- Guignardia dinochloae
- Guignardia dioscoreae
- Guignardia discophora
- Guignardia dodartiae
- Guignardia dracaenae
- Guignardia durmitorensis
- Guignardia dyerae
- Guignardia echinophila
- Guignardia effusa
- Guignardia epilobii
- Guignardia eucalyptorum
- Guignardia eucrypta
- Guignardia eugeniae
- Guignardia eupatorii
- Guignardia euphorbiae
- Guignardia euphorbiae-spinosae
- Guignardia excentrica
- Guignardia fatsiae
- Guignardia festiva
- Guignardia fici
- Guignardia fici-beecheyanae
- Guignardia fici-septicae
- Guignardia flacourtiae
- Guignardia foeniculata
- Guignardia franconica
- Guignardia freycinetiae
- Guignardia fulvida
- Guignardia fuscocinerea
- Guignardia fuscocoriacea
- Guignardia galactina
- Guignardia garciniae
- Guignardia gaultheriae
- Guignardia glycyrrhizae
- Guignardia gmelinae
- Guignardia graminea
- Guignardia graminicola
- Guignardia graminis
- Guignardia harunganae
- Guignardia haydenii
- Guignardia heliconiae
- Guignardia helicteres
- Guignardia herbarum
- Guignardia hernandiae
- Guignardia heterostemmae
- Guignardia heterostemmatis
- Guignardia heterotrichi
- Guignardia heveae
- Guignardia heveicola
- Guignardia hibisci-sabdariffae
- Guignardia himalayensis
- Guignardia hispanica
- Guignardia horaninoviae
- Guignardia humulina
- Guignardia ilicis-formosanae
- Guignardia istriaca
- Guignardia jasmini
- Guignardia jasminicola
- Guignardia juniperina
- Guignardia jussiaeae
- Guignardia justiciae
- Guignardia kareliniae
- Guignardia lapponica
- Guignardia laricina
- Guignardia latemarensis
- Guignardia linderae
- Guignardia lingue
- Guignardia lini
- Guignardia lonchocarpi
- Guignardia lonicerae
- Guignardia lunulata
- Guignardia lysimachiae
- Guignardia magnoliae
- Guignardia mammeae
- Guignardia mangiferae
- Guignardia manihoticola
- Guignardia manihotis
- Guignardia manokwaria
- Guignardia medinillae
- Guignardia melanostigma
- Guignardia mespili
- Guignardia miconiae
- Guignardia microscopica
- Guignardia microsticta
- Guignardia migrans
- Guignardia mildae
- Guignardia mirabilis
- Guignardia miribelii
- Guignardia moelleriana
- Guignardia musae
- Guignardia myopori
- Guignardia nectandrae
- Guignardia niesslii
- Guignardia nilagiriaca
- Guignardia oleandrina
- Guignardia opuntiae
- Guignardia oxyriae
- Guignardia paulowniae
- Guignardia pedrosensis
- Guignardia pegani
- Guignardia perpusilla
- Guignardia perseae
- Guignardia philoprina
- Guignardia photiniae
- Guignardia phytolaccae
- Guignardia pinastri
- Guignardia pipericola
- Guignardia piperis
- Guignardia plectroniae
- Guignardia pleurothallis
- Guignardia podocarpi
- Guignardia polygonati
- Guignardia polygoni
- Guignardia polygoni-chinensis
- Guignardia populi
- Guignardia poterii
- Guignardia prasiolae
- Guignardia prominens
- Guignardia pruni-persicae
- Guignardia psidii
- Guignardia puerariae
- Guignardia puiggarii
- Guignardia pullulans
- Guignardia punctiformis
- Guignardia punctoidea
- Guignardia quercus-ilicis
- Guignardia ramulicola
- Guignardia rathenowiana
- Guignardia reniformis
- Guignardia reticulata
- Guignardia rhamni
- Guignardia rhodomyrti
- Guignardia rhynchosporae
- Guignardia robiniae
- Guignardia rosae
- Guignardia rosaecola
- Guignardia rosicola
- Guignardia rubi
- Guignardia rugosa
- Guignardia ryukyuensis
- Guignardia salicina
- Guignardia sansevieriae
- Guignardia sarcomphali
- Guignardia sawadae
- Guignardia scabiosae
- Guignardia scirpicola
- Guignardia seriata
- Guignardia serratulae
- Guignardia sibirica
- Guignardia singularis
- Guignardia smilacicola
- Guignardia smilacinae
- Guignardia smilacis
- Guignardia sojae
- Guignardia sophorae
- Guignardia spinicola
- Guignardia steppani
- Guignardia sterculiae
- Guignardia stromatica
- Guignardia sudetica
- Guignardia sydowiana
- Guignardia synedrellae
- Guignardia tetrazygiae
- Guignardia theae
- Guignardia tilakii
- Guignardia tofieldiae
- Guignardia traversoana
- Guignardia trichosanthis
- Guignardia tunetana
- Guignardia ulmariae
- Guignardia umbelliferarum
- Guignardia vaccinii
- Guignardia valesiaca
- Guignardia veronicae
- Guignardia verrucicola
- Guignardia xanthosomatis
- Guignardia xylostei
