= Verruculina =

Scientific classification
- Kingdom: Fungi
- Division: Ascomycota
- Class: Dothideomycetes
- Order: Pleosporales
- Family: Didymosphaeriaceae
- Genus: Verruculina; Kohlm. & Volkm.-Kohlm.

Type species
- Verruculina enalia (Kohlm.) Kohlm. & Volkm.-Kohlm.

Genus of fungi

Verruculina is a monotypic genus of fungi in the family Didymosphaeriaceae.

This is a marine fungus with carbonaceous, clypeate and papillate fruiting bodies with elongated, bitunicate asci, with eight brown, uniseptate ascospores with germ pore at the ends. This species lives on branches and twigs at both low and high water marks. It is one of the most dominant marine fungi to colonise woody mangrove substrata.

A former species found in 2008 Verruculina sigmatospora (Speg.) Etayo was found to be a synonym of Lichenoverruculina sigmatospora (Speg.) Etayo & Sharuddin (2011).
