= Micronectria =

Scientific classification
- Kingdom: Fungi
- Division: Ascomycota
- Class: Sordariomycetes
- Order: Amphisphaeriales
- Family: Hyponectriaceae
- Genus: Micronectria; Speg.

Type species
- Micronectria guaranitica Speg.

Genus of fungi

Micronectria is a genus of fungi in the family Hyponectriaceae.

== Species ==
As accepted by Species Fungorum;

- Micronectria agharkarii Ananthan. (1964)
- Micronectria eugeniae Petch (1920)
- Micronectria guaranitica Speg. (1885)
- Micronectria montenegrina Bubák (1915)
- Micronectria syzygii Ciccar. (1951)

Former species;

- M. pterocarpi Racib. (1900) = Sphaerulina pterocarpi, Mycosphaerellaceae
- M. unicaudata (Feltgen) Höhn. (1906) = Ophionectria belonospora, Nectriaceae
