= Sahay Ram Bose =

Sahay Ram Bose (Bengali: সহায়রাম বসু; 15 February 1888 – 1970) was an Indian botanist. He was known for his pioneering work in the study of bracket fungi and the discovery of antibiotics Polysporin and Campestrin. In a research career spanning more than half a century, Bose published 120 papers on various aspects of fungi in an array of academic journals across Europe, America, and Asia. Bose is credited for pioneering work on mycology and the antibacterial properties of fungi.

== Biography ==
=== Early years ===
Sahay Ram Bose was born on 15 February 1888; his father Benimadhab was a civil servant and Sahay Ram Bose studied law at the University of Calcutta before moving to science.

=== Career ===
Bose was Professor of Botany in Bangabasi College in 1909, and Carmichael Medical College in 1916. In 1918 he went to Ceylon (now Sri Lanka) on a deputation to the Royal Botanical Gardens, Perudeniya for training in systematic of Bengal Polyporaceae (bracket fungi) under the famous mycologist Tom Petch. Polyporaceae became the subject for his lifetime study.

Bose published his findings in Polyporaceae of Bengal, a monograph in 11 parts with photo-prints, between 1918 and 1947. Bose's work on ‘Golgi Bodies’ in the basidia of Polypraceae attracted criticism from renowned Botanist J. B. Gatenby. The debate that ensued was covered in several issues of ‘'Nature'’ between 1927 and 1929. Ultimately Bose's views prevailed.

Bose's paper on "the spore- forming bacterium on rice grains" in Lancet in May 1924 refuted the old "rice-toxin" theory of Knowles, Acton and Chopra. Bose's comments on the problem of wheat rust were published in issues of ‘'Nature'’ (1950) and ‘'Science’' (1953). He investigated luminous fungi and ant-hill fungi from termite nests. He proved with the help of P.W.Wilson of Wisconsin University that, contrary to prevailing view, Phoma casuarinae did not fix nitrogen directly from the air.

Bose studied edible fungi in India and advised widely on their cultivation. One of the crowning achievements of Bose was his discovery of two antibiotics obtained from higher fungi, polyporin from Polistictus sanguineus and campestrin from Psalliota campestris, which were not concentrated. He studied the effects of radiation on some polypores in culture in 1938.

Bose worked as a Director of Research under the C.N.R.S of the government of France from 1957 to 1959, for which he studied the movement of chemicals from the host trees with isotope P32 that induced the formation of bracket fungi on the tree. Bose built up over the years a herbarium for bracket fungi by collections from different parts of the world. The herbarium, containing about 4000 specimens of Polyporaceae, was entered in the list of World Herberia, Index Herbarium, Utrecht, Netherlands. It includes one specimen contributed by Emperor Hirohito of Japan, who was an amateur Botanist. The herbarium is now housed in the Presidency College, now Presidency University, of which Bose is an alumnus. His collection of local and foreign reprints of about 1000 packages is also located at the college.

== Awards ==
- Three-time winner of the Griffith Memorial Prize of Calcutta University in 1925, 1927 and 1929 for studies on higher fungi.
- Winner of Bruhl Memorial Medal & Barclay Memorial Medal of Asiatic Society in 1947 and 1953, respectively.
- Bose was elected Fellow of the Royal Society of Edinburgh in 1925.
- Honorary Member of Societa Internationale di Microbiologia of Italy in 1930.
- Elected fellow of National Institute of Sciences of India at the first year of its election of Fellows in 1935.
- President of the Botany section of the Indian Science Congress in 1937.
- Twice President of the Botanical Society of India for 1937 and 1938.
- Elected Honorary Member and Fellow of the Bengal Botanical Society in 1965 and of the Indian Phytopathological Society in 1964.

== Publications ==
- Polyporaceae of Bengal (1918)
- Sexuality of Polyporus Ostreiformis and Polystictus Hirsutus (1934)

== Personal life ==
Bose was married to Annapurna Debi and they had eight children.

== See also ==
Martin Beazor Ellis
