= Rhachidicola =

Scientific classification
- Kingdom: Fungi
- Division: Ascomycota
- Class: Sordariomycetes
- Order: Amphisphaeriales
- Family: Hyponectriaceae
- Genus: Rhachidicola; K.D. Hyde & J. Fröhl.

Genus of fungi

Rhachidicola is a genus of fungi in the family Hyponectriaceae.
