= Frondicola =

Scientific classification
- Kingdom: Fungi
- Division: Ascomycota
- Class: Sordariomycetes
- Order: Amphisphaeriales
- Family: Hyponectriaceae
- Genus: Frondicola; K.D.Hyde (1992)

Type species
- Frondicola tunitricuspis K.D.Hyde (1992)

Genus of fungi

Frondicola is a fungal genus in the Hyponectriaceae family and Xylariales order. It was formerly placed in the Annulatascaceae family of the Ascomycota. This is a monotypic genus, containing the single species Frondicola tunitricuspis, described as new to science by mycologist Kevin Hyde in 1992.
