= Phragmitensis =

Scientific classification
- Kingdom: Fungi
- Division: Ascomycota
- Class: Sordariomycetes
- Order: Amphisphaeriales
- Family: Hyponectriaceae
- Genus: Phragmitensis; K.M. Wang, Poon & K.D. Hyde

Type species
- Phragmitensis marina M.K.M. Wong, Poon & K.D. Hyde

Genus of fungi

Phragmitensis is a genus of fungi in the Ascomycota phylum.

The relationship of this taxon to other taxa within the phylum was formerly unknown (incertae sedis), and it had not yet been placed with certainty into any class, order, or family. It has now been placed into class Sordariomycetes, order Amphisphaeriales, and family Hyponectriaceae.

== Species ==
As accepted by Species Fungorum;

- Phragmitensis ellipsoidea M.K.M. Wong, Goh & K.D. Hyde (1999)
- Phragmitensis marina M.K.M. Wong, Poon & K.D. Hyde (1998)
