= Chamaeascus =

Scientific classification
- Kingdom: Fungi
- Division: Ascomycota
- Class: Sordariomycetes
- Order: Amphisphaeriales
- Family: Hyponectriaceae
- Genus: Chamaeascus; L.Holm, K.Holm & M.E. Barr

Type species
- Chamaeascus arcticus L. Holm, K. Holm & M.E. Barr

Genus of fungi

Chamaeascus is a genus of fungi in the family Hyponectriaceae. This is a monotypic genus, containing the single species Chamaeascus arcticus.
