= Exarmidium =

Scientific classification
- Kingdom: Fungi
- Division: Ascomycota
- Class: Sordariomycetes
- Order: Amphisphaeriales
- Family: Hyponectriaceae
- Genus: Exarmidium; P. Karst.

Type species
- Exarmidium hysteriiforme P. Karst.

Genus of fungi

Exarmidium is a genus of fungi in the family Hyponectriaceae.

== Species ==
As accepted by Species Fungorum;

- Exarmidium biseptatum (Sherwood) Aptroot (1998)
- Exarmidium blumeanum (Rehm) Theiss. & Syd. (1915)
- Exarmidium calotropidis (R. Rao) A. Pande (2008)
- Exarmidium clypeatum Petr. (1947)
- Exarmidium diaphanum (Cooke & Ellis) M.E. Barr & Boise (1985)
- Exarmidium ericae Petr. (1929)
- Exarmidium excellens (Rehm ex Sacc.) Aptroot (1998)
- Exarmidium hemisphaericum (Fr.) Aptroot (1998)
- Exarmidium hysteriiforme P. Karst. (1873)
- Exarmidium inclusum (Pers.) Aptroot (1998)
- Exarmidium kleinmondense Marinc., M.J. Wingf. & Crous (2008)
- Exarmidium lacustre Kirschst. (1935)
- Exarmidium marchicum Kirschst. (1939)
- Exarmidium weirii (Petr.) Petr. (1929)

Former species;

- E. caesalpiniae (R. Rao) A. Pande (2008) = Clypeothecium caesalpiniae, Hyponectriaceae
- E. fusariisporum (Ellis & Everh.) Theiss. & Syd. (1915) = Microdochium fusariisporum, Amphisphaeriaceae
- E. indicum (Tilak & S.B. Kale) A. Pande (2008) = Clypeothecium indicum, Hyponectriaceae
- E. morthieri (Fuckel) M.E. Barr & Boise (1985) = Zignoella morthieri, Chaetosphaeriaceae
