= Lichenoverruculina =

Scientific classification
- Kingdom: Fungi
- Division: Ascomycota
- Class: Sordariomycetes
- Order: Amphisphaeriales
- Family: Hyponectriaceae
- Genus: Lichenoverruculina; Etayo (1992)

Type species
- Lichenoverruculina sigmatospora (Speg.) Etayo & Sharuddin (2011)

Synonyms
- Metanectria sigmatospora Speg., Boln Acad. nac. Cienc. Córdoba 11(4): 528 (1889); Verruculina sigmatospora (Speg.) Etayo, in Etayo & Rosato, Lichenologist 40(3): 230 (2008)

Genus of fungi

Lichenoverruculina is a fungal genus in the family Hyponectriaceae and order Amphisphaeriales. This is a monotypic genus, containing the single species Lichenoverruculina sigmatospora. which was published in Herzogia vol.24 (2) on page 274 in 2011.

In a revision of lichenicolous fungi described by Spegazzini by botanists Etayo & Rosato in 2008, they proposed a new genus of Verruculina Etayo, unaware that this generic name was already used for an unrelated marine fungus group by Kohlmeyer & Volkmann-Kohlmeyer (in 1990), as Verruculina Kohlm. & Volkm.-Kohlm. The name Lichenoverruculina Etayo & Sharuddin was then proposed to replace Verruculina Etayo.

== Description ==
Lichenoverruculina is lichenicolous (a parasitic fungus that only lives on lichen as the host), with immersed perithecia under the thallus of various Heterodermia species (a genera of lichen in the family Physciaceae). The genus has abundant paraphyses (erect sterile filament-like support structures), 32-spored, cylindrical asci and fusoid-sigmoid, 2-celled, hyaline ascospores.

== Distribution ==
It has only been found in Brazil, South America.
