= Guignardia mangiferae =

Scientific classification
- Kingdom: Fungi
- Division: Ascomycota
- Class: Dothideomycetes
- Order: Botryosphaeriales
- Family: Botryosphaeriaceae
- Genus: Guignardia
- Species: G. mangiferae

Binomial name
- Guignardia mangiferae A.J.Roy (1968)

Species of fungus

Guignardia mangiferae is a tropical endophytic fungus that inhabits living plant tissues without causing visible disease symptoms, although some members of the genus are associated with plant disease.
