= Papilionovela =

Scientific classification
- Kingdom: Fungi
- Division: Ascomycota
- Class: Lecanoromycetes
- Order: Graphidales
- Family: Graphidaceae
- Genus: Papilionovela; Aptroot

Type species
- Papilionovela albothallina Aptroot

Genus of fungi

Papilionovela is a genus of fungi in the family Graphidaceae. This is a monotypic genus, containing the single species Papilionovela albothallina.
