= Guy Richard Bisby =

Guy Richard Bisby

Guy Richard Bisby (1889–1958) was an American Canadian mycologist and botanist in plant pathology. He spent his early career working as a professor at the University of Minnesota and University of Manitoba in plant pathology, and his late career as Senior Assistant Mycologist at the Imperial Mycological Institute in Kew, England. He published around fifty books and papers in mycology that extensively contributed to the taxonomy and nomenclature of fungi.

== Biography ==
Guy Richard Bisby was born on August 17, 1889, in Brookings, South Dakota. He grew up in South Dakota and earned a Bachelor of Science at South Dakota State College in 1912, and continued working at the college for a year after. He then worked as an assistant at the Brooklyn Botanic Garden in New York from 1913 to 1914, where he gained an interest in plant pathology. He studied at Columbia University in New York from 1914 to 1915. He also did work on potato diseases, working as a consulting pathologist to the American Potato Corporation in Presque Isle, Maine. He worked as an assistant in botany with Purdue University in West Lafayette, Indiana, from 1915 to 1916. While at Purdue, he worked with the plant pathologist and mycologist Joseph Charles Arthur. In 1916, he married Helen Hitchcock. He moved to Minnesota in 1916 where he both studied and worked at the University of Minnesota. He finished his Master's Degree from Columbia in 1917, albeit via his studies in Minnesota. At UM, he earned his doctorate in 1920, and became an Assistant Professor of Plant Pathology. At the invitation of Arthur Henry Reginald Buller, the founder of the Botany Department at the University of Manitoba, Bisby moved to Winnipeg, Canada in 1920 to join Buller's department as a professor of plant pathology there. Sadly, his wife Helen died of illness in 1920.

Mycology and plant pathology have a strong overlap due to rusts, pathogenic plant-killing fungal diseases. Bisby took a year's long leave of absence in 1921–1922 to visit the Imperial Bureau of Mycology in Kew, England. After his return to Manitoba, he set about systemizing and collecting fungi in the region. The result was the 1929 book The Fungi of Manitoba, which he co-authored with Buller and John Dearness. In 1931, he and co-author Edwin John Butler published The Fungi of India, partially based on samples collected while Bisby was on sabbatical there. Bisby remarried in 1936 to Berenice Butler, an English artist. Preparing to move to England, he resigned from the University of Manitoba. During his term in Winnipeg, Bisby (and Buller's team) had gathered several thousand fungi samples which were stored in the herbarium of the University of Manitoba. The collection was later transferred to the Canadian National Mycological Herbarium (DAOM) in Ottawa. He also republished The Fungi of Manitoba in an expanded second edition in 1939. Bisby was still close friends with Buller, and as Buller grew ill late in his life, he arranged for Bisby to edit the seventh and final volume of Buller's work Researches on Fungi. Buller died in 1943, and the work was eventually published in 1950.

Bisby and his new wife moved to England in 1937, returning to Kew where he had worked at the Imperial Mycological Institute (the new name of the Imperial Bureau of Mycology) in 1921. Among others, Bisby collaborated with Geoffrey Clough Ainsworth while in England. The two published A Dictionary of the Fungi in 1943, with a 2nd edition in 1945, a 3rd edition in 1950, and a 4th edition in 1954. The dictionary would continue to be repeatedly updated and kept in print by later mycologists, with later editions called Ainsworth & Bisby's Dictionary of the Fungi directly in the title. It is currently on its 10th edition, most recently updated in 2008. Bisby wrote An Introduction to the Taxonomy and Nomenclature of Fungi in 1945, as well as an updated second edition in 1953. Bisby also co-authored with Thomas Petch The Fungi of Ceylon, published in 1950 after Petch's death in 1948.

Bisby retired in 1954. After a four-year illness, he died on September 3, 1958, at his home in Staines, Middlesex. Obituaries often noted that Bisby had a reputation as a hard worker who largely skipped conferences, committees, and meetings, eschewing administrative work to doggedly gather samples and write articles and books with his co-authors. Other than his work on the fungi of Manitoba, India, and Ceylon, Bisby's areas of expertise included catalogs of Pyrenomycetes, Hyphomycetes, and rusts of Great Britain; as well as work on Hysteriales. Honors he received including the University of Manitoba awarding him a medal in 1956 for his contributions to mycology, as well as serving as a vice-president in the British Mycological Society.
