= Guignardia fulvida =

Scientific classification
- Kingdom: Fungi
- Division: Ascomycota
- Class: Dothideomycetes
- Order: Botryosphaeriales
- Family: Botryosphaeriaceae
- Genus: Guignardia
- Species: G. fulvida

Binomial name
- Guignardia fulvida (F.R. Sand.) Sivan. (1984)

Synonyms
- Columnosphaeria fulvida (F.R. Sand.) M.E. Barr (2001); Discosphaerina fulvida

Species of fungus

Guignardia fulvida is a fungus that is a plant pathogen in the family Botryosphaeriaceae.
