= John Dearness =

John Dearness (13 May 1852 – 6 December 1954) was a Canadian educator, botanist, and mycologist. Largely self taught he conducted scientific studies in plant pathology leading to B.T. Dickson of the McGill University called him the "Rostrup" of Canada, comparing him with the Danish plant pathologist Emil Rostrup (1831-1907).

Dearness was born in Hamilton, Canada West and grew up on a farm near London, Canada West. At a young age he began a wildflower garden. At school he took an interest in natural history and at 19 he became principal of the Lucan village school and three years later principal of the Strathroy public school. In 1874 he became an inspector of public schools in East Middlesex. In 1881 he married Harriet Emma Wilkinson. He served as a professor of biology at Western University from 1888 to 1914. From the 1880s he began collecting and documenting plants and fungi, publishing on the latter with J.B. Ellis. He received a BA in 1902 and an MA in 1903 from the Western University. He wrote extensively on nature education, including a book How to Teach the Nature Study Course (1905). He was a member of numerous societies including the Entomological Society of Ontario, the Nature Study Association of America, the McIlwraith Ornithological Society. In 1893 he was in charge of Ontario educational exhibit at the Chicago World Fair. On his 100th birthday, a John Dearness Home for Elder Citizens was set up in Ontario.
