= Hyponectriaceae =

Scientific classification
- Kingdom: Fungi
- Division: Ascomycota
- Class: Sordariomycetes
- Order: Amphisphaeriales
- Family: Hyponectriaceae; Petr.

Type genus
- Hyponectria Sacc.

Genera
- See text

Family of fungi

The Hyponectriaceae are a family of fungi, that was formerly in the order Xylariales. It was placed in the Amphisphaeriales order in 2020.

== Genera ==
As accepted in 2020 (with amount of genera);

- Apiothyrium Petr. (2)
- Arecomyces K.D. Hyde (10)
- Arwidssonia B. Erikss. (2)
- Cesatiella Sacc. (3)
- Chamaeascus L. Holm, K. Holm & M.E. Barr (1)
- Discosphaerina Höhn. (21)
- Exarmidium P. Karst. (14)
- Frondicola K.D. Hyde (1)
- Hyponectria Sacc. (30)
- Lichenoverruculina Etayo (1)
- Micronectria Speg. (4)
- Papilionovela Aptroot (1)
- Pellucida Dulym., Sivan., P.F. Cannon & Peerally (1)
- Phragmitensis M.K.M. Wong, Poon & K.D. Hyde (2)
- Physalospora Niessl (37)
- Rhachidicola K.D. Hyde & J. Fröhl. (1)
- Xenothecium Höhn. (1)
