= Edwin John Butler =

Irish mycologist and plant pathologist (1874-1943)

Sir Edwin John Butler CMG CIE FRS
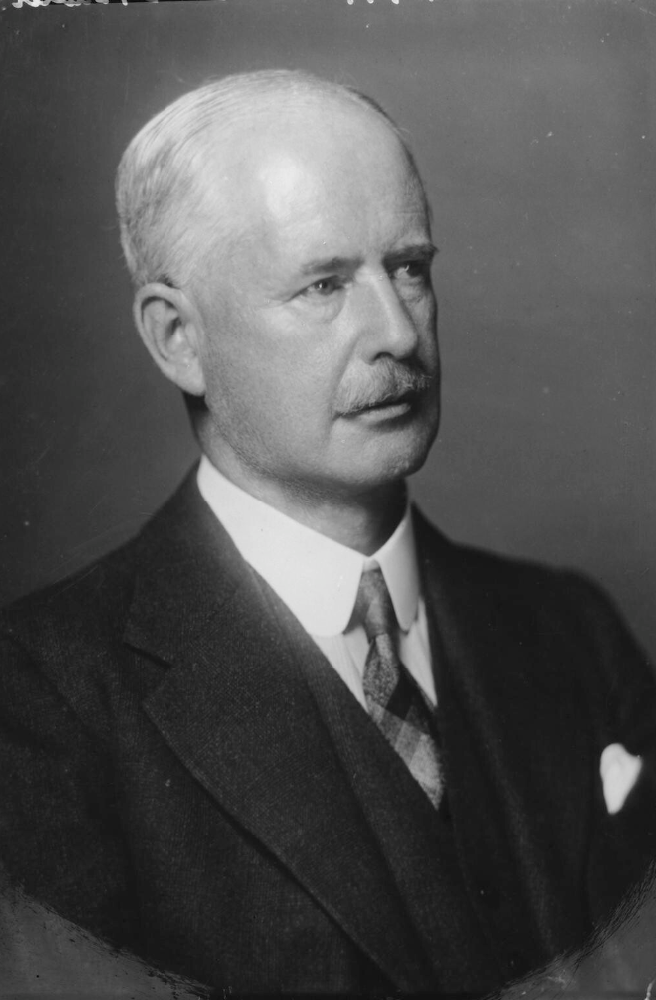
- Butler in the 1930s
- Born: 13 August 1874; Kilkee, County Clare, Ireland
- Died: 4 April 1943 (aged 68)
- Known for: Contributions to mycology and plant pathology
- Scientific career
- Fields: Mycology, Plant pathology
- Author abbrev. (botany): E.J.Butler

Sir Edwin John Butler CMG CIE FRS (13 August 1874 – 4 April 1943) was an Irish mycologist and plant pathologist. He became the Imperial Mycologist in India and later the first director of the Imperial Bureau of Mycology in England. He was knighted in 1939. During his twenty years in India, he began large scale surveys on fungi and plant pathology and published the landmark book Fungi and Disease in Plants: An Introduction to the Diseases of Field and Plantation Crops, especially those of India and the East (1918) and has been called the Father of Mycology and Plant Pathology in India.

== Background and education ==
E.J. Butler was born in Kilkee, County Clare, Ireland the son of Thomas Butler, a resident magistrate. He initially went to school in Gainsborough, Lincolnshire but returned to Ireland in 1887 due to illness and studied under a tutor. A library in Cahersiveen where his father was transferred helped him develop an interest in a diverse range of topics. In 1890 his health improved and he went to the Christian Brothers School followed by Queen's College, Cork, where in 1898 he took the degrees of M.B., B.Ch., and B.A.O. Butler also received an MSc in Botany from University College Cork in 1920.

== Career in India ==
Butler took an initial interest in botany thanks to Marcus Hartog, a Professor of Natural History. Hartog was researching Saprolegnia a genus of fungus-like water moulds and Butler learnt techniques of study which he later applied to the related genus Pythium. He went to Paris, Antibes, Freiburg, and Kew, spending time in the Jardin des Plantes in Paris in the laboratory of mycologist Philippe Édouard Léon Van Tieghem. In 1900, at the recommendation of the Royal Botanic Gardens, Kew, he was appointed as the first Cryptogamic Botanist to the Government of India at Calcutta.

In 1902, Butler was transferred to Dehra Dun under the Imperial Agricultural Department. During a visit to Coorg he studied spike disease of sandalwood which was later studied by L. C. Coleman, the Government Botanist in the state of Mysore. In 1905 he became Imperial Mycologist at the Imperial Agricultural Research Institute at Pusa. He published a monograph of the Indian wheat rusts in 1906 and his research on Pythium in 1907. In 1918 he produced "Fungi and diseases in plants", which became a standard reference work for tropical plant pathologists. Between 1910 and 1912 Butler additionally held the office of Director and Principal at the Agricultural College in Pusa. In 1921 his services to India were recognised and he was awarded the Order of the Indian Empire.

== Career in England ==
In 1920, Butler returned to the United Kingdom to take up the post of director at the new Imperial Bureau of Mycology at Kew, Surrey, which was intended to research and provide information on plant diseases throughout the British empire. He helped staff and establish the bureau, later known as the International Mycological Institute, until his resignation in 1935. Among his later studies were Panama disease of bananas, witch's broom disease of cacao in Trinidad, and Yellow Leaf disease of tea in Nyasaland. In 1930 he published the Fungi of India along with Guy Richard Bisby. Butler subsequently became the first paid secretary of the Agricultural Research Council until ill-health forced his retirement in 1941.

Butler was elected a Fellow of the Royal Society in 1926, president of the British Mycological Society in 1927 and president of the Association of Applied Biologists from 1928 to 1929. He was appointed to the Order of St Michael and St George (CMG) in 1932 and was knighted in 1932. He died in 1944 following an attack of influenza.

Several species of fungal pathogens were named by him and many have been named in his honour.

== Commemoration in Ireland ==
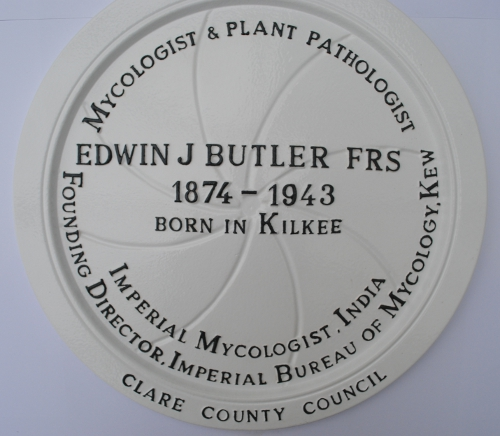
Butler plaque in Kilkee

The work of Sir Edwin John Butler is commemorated in the naming of a building at University College Cork (formerly Queen's College, Cork) in his honour. The Butler Building houses plant science teaching and research facilities, part of the School of Biological, Earth and Environmental Sciences at the university. The school also awards a 'Butler Prize' to plant science undergraduate students. The Society of Irish Plant Pathologists award a Butler Medal to individuals who have made a significant contribution to plant pathology in Ireland. A plaque in his honour was unveiled at Kilkee, County Clare in May 2012 by the National Committee for Commemorative Plaques in Science and Technology.

== Selected publications ==
- 1903. Report on 'Spike' disease among sandalwood trees.
- 1906. (With J. M. Hayman and W. H. Moreland) Indian wheat rusts. Mem. Dep. Agric. India, Bot. Ser. (2) 1, 58 pp. 1 graph, 5 pls. (4 col.).
- 1908. Report on coconut palm disease in Travancore. Bull. Agric. Res. Inst. Pusa, no. 9, 23 pp.
- 1909. Fomes lucidus (Leys) Fr. a suspected parasite. Indian Forester, 35, 514–518, 1 col. pl.
- 1918. Fungi and disease in plants. Thacker, Spink & Co. Calcutta. vi+547 pp. 206 figs.
- 1924. Bud-rot of coconut and other palms. Rep. Imp. Bot. Conf. Lond. July 1924, 145–147.
- 1925. Meteorological conditions and plant diseases. Int. Ree. Sci. Pract. Agric. n.s. (2) 3, 369–384.
- 1926. The wilt diseases of cotton and sesamum in India. Agric. J. India, (4)21,268–273, 1pl.
- 1931. (With G. R. Bisby) The fungi of India. Scientific Monograph Imperial Council of Agric. Research no. 1, xviii+237 pp. 1 map.
