= Stanley Hughes =

Canadian mycologist

Stanley John Hughes
- Born: 1918; Llanelly, Wales
- Died: 2019 (aged 100–101)
- Education: University of Wales in Aberystwyth
- Scientific career
- Fields: Mycology
- Workplaces: Agriculture and Agri-Food Canada
- Author abbrev. (botany): S.Hughes

Stanley John Hughes (1918–2019) was a Canadian scientist who was known his work in the field of mycology for developing and introducing a precise and meticulous system for classifying fungi that is still used today. A naturalized Canadian, he was a federal research scientist for Agriculture and Agri-Food Canada at what is today the Ottawa Research and Development Centre.

Throughout his professional career he made significant contributions to the field of fungal taxonomy. His contributions introduced an updated method of classifying fungi to enable more in-depth research on moulds. His mentorship of young scientists throughout his career also helped create a new generation of mycology taxonomists.

== Biography ==
Hughes was born in Llanelly, Wales in 1918. He completed his studies at the University of Wales in Aberystwyth where he obtained a Bachelor of Science degree, (1941), Master of Science (1943) and Doctor of Science (1954). First at Aberystwyth, then at Cardiff, he studied plant diseases through the National Agricultural Advisory Service. From 1945 to 1952, Hughes worked as an assistant mycologist at the Commonwealth Mycological Institute in Kew, England where he helped classify micro-fungi from all over the commonwealth.

In 1952 Hughes joined Canada's federal department of agriculture (AAFC) which became the Ottawa Research and Development Centre. His research played an integral role in supporting Canada's National Mycological Herbarium and the Canadian Collection of Fungal Cultures. These national reference collections help scientists identify fungi and support research to control fungal pathogens that affect Canadian agricultural production.

Hughes retired in 1983, but continued his research well into his 90s as an Honorary Research Associate with AAFC at the Eastern Cereal and Oilseed Research Centre in Ottawa where he continued his work on sooty moulds and publish in scientific journals. He died in 2019, having recently celebrated 61 years of marriage.

== Career ==
Upon coming to Canada, Hughes almost immediately initiated a new era in the classification of conidial fungi, an economically important group of fungi, commonly referred to as moulds, that reproduce asexually by producing masses of spores called “conidia”.

His 1953 paper in the Canadian Journal of Botany, “Conidiophores, conidia, and classification” offered a novel approach to modifying the classification of conidial fungi. He proposed a number of useful descriptive terms such as blastospore, porospore, meristem arthrospore, and basauxic conidiophores which are now widely used. This paper contained meticulously prepared descriptions, arguments and illustrations regarding conidial fungi classification.

The approach for classifying fungi that Hughes recommended provided a prospect for improving communication, organization, and retrieval of information about conidial fungi. This work was a significant update to the systematics of conidial fungi and it influenced subsequent mycological taxonomic literature. In a subsequent 1958 paper, Hughes compiled an extensive list of more than 1,000 accepted genera, species and synonymies of conidial fungi.

Hughes travelled extensivvely to collect and study microfungi which resulted in over 130 publications, descriptions of hundreds of new genera and species and identification keys to help classify many moulds. In 1949 he spent three months in Ghana as a visiting scientist and in 1955 he visited many European national and university fungal collections to trace important specimens gathered by early mycologists. A Senior Research Fellowship from New Zealand in 1963 enabled him to spend a year in that country and author more than 30 papers on the fungi of New Zealand. In 1974 he spent three months at the Mycological Institute of the University of Pernambuco in Recife, Brazil.

In the 1960s Hughes turned his attention towards sooty moulds, a complex of fungi that grows on honeydew excreted by sucking insects or on plant exudate. Sooty moulds occur sporadically through the world but are particularly abundant and conspicuous in the “mist forests” of the Pacific basin. In 1976 Hughes published a paper demonstrating that sooty moulds are not a single family but represent two different families belonging to two different orders of fungi.

== Awards and recognition ==
On Hughes' 80th birthday in 1998 the Canadian Journal of Botany, where many of his scientific papers were published, included two articles from colleagues paying tribute to his research.

Tributes to Hughes are also documented in two volumes commemorating the achievements of the International Mycological Institute – one published by the Centre for Agricultural Bioscience International (CABI) in 1993 and a second published by Cambridge University Press in 1996. Both books single out Hughes’ 1953 contribution as the most significant paper on the systematics of conidial fungi of the twentieth century and the most profound contribution to mycological taxonomic literature in the history of the International Mycological Institute.

Professional Honours:

- Jakob Eriksson Gold Medal, Swedish Academy of Science (Third recipient, 1969 )
- President, Mycological Society of America (1974)
- Member of the Royal Society of Canada (Fellow, 1974)
- Vice-president, International Mycological Association (1971 to 1983)
- George Lawson Medal of the Canadian Botanical Association (1981 )
- Distinguished Mycologist Award, Mycological Society of America (1985)
- Linnean Society of London (Foreign member, 1986)
- Honorary Member, Foreign Vice President, British Mycological Society (1987 )
- Member to the Order of Canada “for his lifetime contribution to the field of mycology, particularly for his seminal work on the classification of various fungi and moulds, and for his mentoring of young scientists.” (2010)

In 2009 he presided over the official opening of the National Botanical Garden of Wales Stanley J Hughes Mycological Collection where he donated over 10,000 books and reprints from his personal collection of the world-renowned taxonomic mycologist.

== See also ==
- Category:Taxa named by Stanley Hughes
