= International Mycological Institute =

English non-profit organisation

The International Mycological Institute was a non-profit organisation, based in England, that undertook research and disseminated information on fungi, particularly plant pathogenic species causing crop diseases. It was established as the Imperial Bureau of Mycology at Kew in 1920 and amalgamated with CAB International in 1998.

== History ==
The Imperial Bureau of Mycology was established in 1920 as a centre for accumulating and disseminating information on plant pathogenic fungi in the British Empire and for undertaking systematic research into such fungi. It was initially based in two houses at Kew, but in 1930 moved into a purpose-built building in the grounds of the Royal Botanic Gardens. In the same year, it became part of the Imperial Agricultural Bureaux and was renamed the Imperial Mycological Institute (IMI).

IMI provided an identification service for pathogenic fungi from 1921 onwards and in 1922 started publishing abstracts of research literature in the Review of Applied Mycology. An herbarium of fungal specimens was also established. The journal Index of Fungi, covering all new fungal names, began in 1940 and the Bibliography of Systematic Mycology in 1947. In 1943, the first edition of the standard reference work, the Dictionary of the Fungi was published. A culture collection of living fungi was initiated in 1947.

In 1948, IMI changed its name to the Commonwealth Mycological Institute and in 1986 to the International Mycological Institute. In 1993, it was moved from Kew to Egham, Surrey, and in 1998 it merged with the International Institute of Entomology, the International Institute of Biocontrol, and the International Institute of Parasitology to form CAB International. In 2010, the former IMI herbarium was merged with that of the Royal Botanic Gardens, Kew.

=== Director of the Imperial Bureau of Mycology ===
- Sir Edwin John Butler (1920–1930)

=== Director of the Imperial Bureau of Mycology ===
- Sir Edwin John Butler (1930–1935)
- Sydney Francis Ashby (1935–1939)
- Samuel Paul Wiltshire (1940–1948)

=== Director of the Commonwealth Mycological Institute ===
- Samuel Paul Wiltshire (1948–1956)
- John Collier Frederick Hopkins (1956–1964)
- Geoffrey Clough Ainsworth (1964–1968)
- Anthony Johnston (1968–1983)
- David Leslie Hawksworth (1983–1986)

=== Director of the International Mycological Institute ===
- David Leslie Hawksworth (1986–1997)
