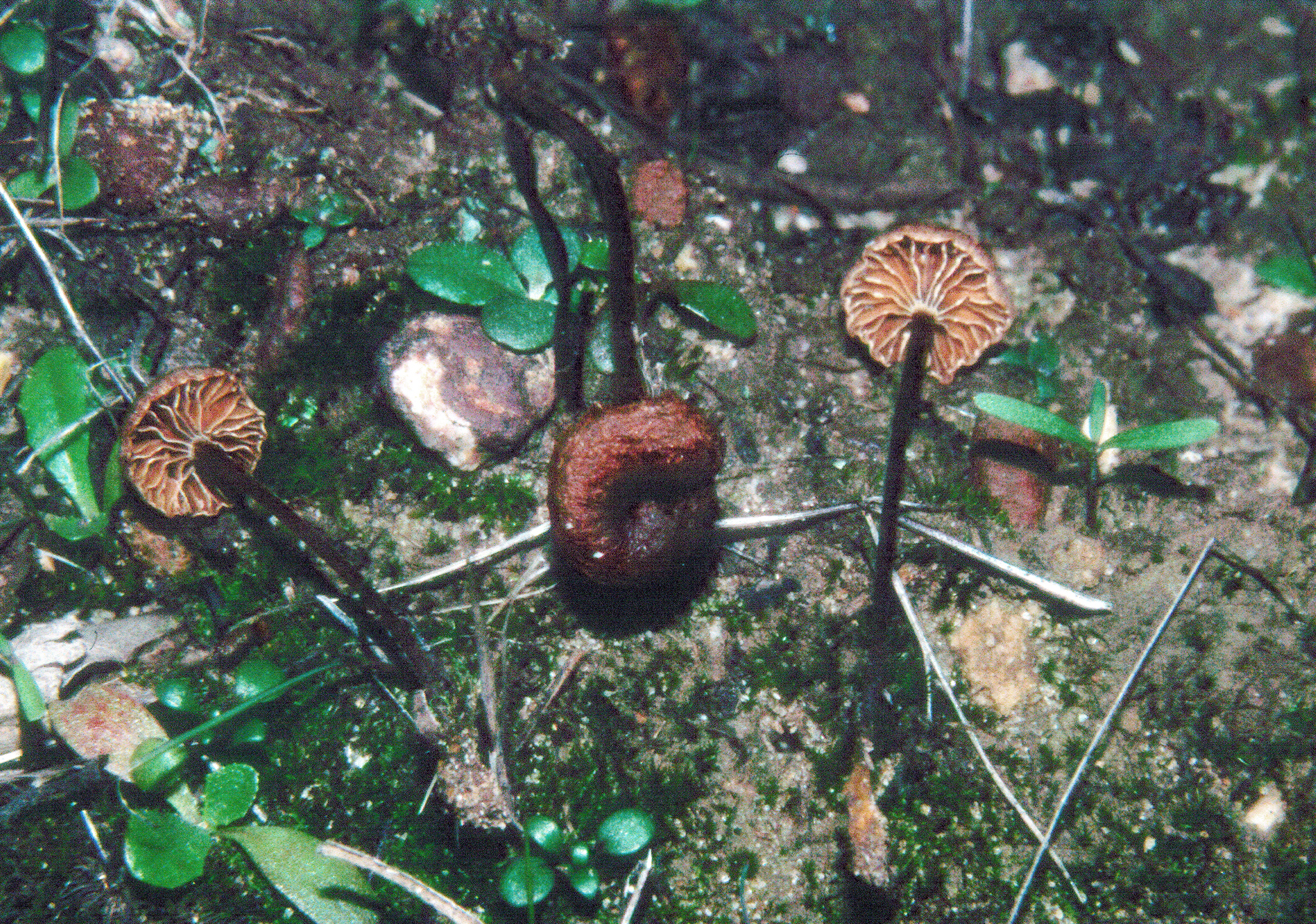

Scientific classification
- Domain: Eukaryota
- Kingdom: Fungi
- Division: Basidiomycota
- Class: Agaricomycetes
- Order: Agaricales
- Family: Mycenaceae
- Genus: Xeromphalina
- Species: X. setulipes

Binomial name
- Xeromphalina setulipes Esteve-Rav. & G.Moreno (2010)
- The species is known only from Ciudad Real Province, Spain.

= Xeromphalina setulipes =

Species of fungus

Xeromphalina setulipes is a species of fungus of the family Mycenaceae. First collected in 2005, it was described and named in 2010 by Fernando Esteve-Raventós and Gabriel Moreno, and is known only from oak forests in Ciudad Real Province, Spain. The species produces mushrooms with dark reddish-brown caps up to 15 millimetres (0.59 in) across, dark purplish-brown stems up to 45 millimetres (1.8 in) in height and distinctive, arched, brown gills. The mushrooms were found growing directly from the acidic soil of the forest floor, surrounded by plant waste, during November.

Morphologically, the dark colour of the gills and stem, lack of a strong taste, and characters of the cystidia (large cells found on the mushrooms) are the most distinguishing characteristics of X. setulipes. These features allow the species to be readily distinguished from other, similar species, including X. cauticinalis and X. brunneola. Its ecology and habitat are also distinct, but it is unclear whether they can serve as certain identifying characteristics. Within the genus Xeromphalina, X. setulipes is classified in the section Mutabiles, along with several other species. It seems most closely related to X. fraxinophila, X. cornui, X. campanelloides and X. cauticinalis, but, according to Esteve-Raventós and colleagues, further analysis is required to accurately judge the relationships between the species of Xeromphalina.

== Taxonomy ==
- - - - X. cauticinalis
      - X. aff. parvibulbosa
    - X. setulipes
  - - X. campanella
    - X. junipericola

A cladogram showing the results of internal transcribed spacer (ITS) analysis, demonstrating one hypothesis about the relationships between X. setulipes and some other members of the genus.

Xeromphalina setulipes was first described in 2010 in an article in Mycological Progress by Fernando Esteve-Raventós and Gabriel Moreno, both of the University of Alcalá. The description was based on specimens collected during 2005 field work in Ciudad Real Province, Spain. The type specimen was collected on 17 November, and was found 770 metres (2,530 ft) above sea level. The specific epithet setulipes is from the Latin setula, meaning "stiff hair", and pes, meaning "foot", in reference to the bristly hairs that cover the stem.

Within Xeromphalina, X. setulipes is part of the section Mutabiles, which also contains X. campanelloides, X. cauticinalis, X. cirris, X. cornui, and X. fraxinophila. Phylogenetic analysis performed by Esteve-Raventós and colleagues concluded that X. setulipes appears to be most closely related to X. fraxinophila, X. cornui, X. campanelloides and X. cauticinalis, the five of which are clearly separate from the group containing X. campanella, X. kauffmanii, X. brunneola, and, possibly, X. junipericola. Data from the large subunit (60S) of the nuclear ribosomal RNA gene suggests that the species is most closely related to X. campanelloides, while internal transcribed spacer (ITS) data place it closest to a clade containing X. cauticinalis and X. aff. parvibulbosa (an unidentified species similar, but not identical, to X. parvibulbosa). Further research, analysing the ITS or RPB2 loci, could serve to help clarify the precise relationships of species and positions of clades within the genus.

== Description ==
Xeromphalina setulipes Mycological characteristics
- Gills on hymenium
- Cap is convex or flat
- Hymenium is decurrent
- Stipe is bare
- Ecology is saprotrophic

Xeromphalina setulipes produces basidiocarps in the form of mushrooms. Each mushroom has a flattened-convex cap of between 8 and 15 millimetres (0.31 and 0.59 in) in diameter with a depressed centre. It is not particularly hygrophanous (it does not change color as it loses or absorbs water), and, unlike the caps of related species, is neither grooved nor translucent at the margin. The cap is dark brown, sometimes with reddish colouration. It becomes paler, turning tobacco-brown, when it dries; this change is more noticeable at the cap margin. The caps of young mushrooms are smooth and hairless, but they wrinkle as they age; however, fine, soft hairs are sometimes visible towards the margin (which is rolled inwards) when the cap is dry. The margin is typically not smooth; instead, it undulates.

The cylindrical stem measures between 30 and 45 mm (1 and 2 in) in length by 1 and 2 mm (0.04 and 0.08 in) in width, though it is slightly thicker at the very bottom. It is stiff, but can be somewhat flexible. The colour is a dark brown, sometimes approaching black, with purplish hints. It appears smooth, but is actually covered in minute tufts. The hairs at the base of the stem are somewhat more visible, and are an amber colour. The gills are subdistant (neither close to, nor distant from, one another) and are of a distinctive shape; they are decurrent, that is, they extend down the stem, and are noticeably arched. The gills can be up to 2 mm (0.08 in) thick, and sometimes split into two. The gills are a tobacco-brown no matter the age of the mushroom, though the edges can be paler (sometimes whitish) and crenulate. The flesh is firm but flexible, and the same colour as the surface. It has an indistinct smell, and a taste that is not bitter.

=== Microscopic characteristics ===
Xeromphalina setulipes has smooth, ellipsoid to somewhat cylindrical spores that measure from 5.0 to 7.3 micrometres (μm) by 2.9 to 3.7 μm. They are amyloid, meaning that they stain a dark colour in Melzer's reagent or Lugol's solution, and have thin cell walls. The four-spored (occasionally two-spored) basidia are shaped like narrow clubs, sometimes approaching cylindrical, and measure between 21 and 30 μm long by 4.5 to 5.5 μm wide. The sterigmata, the narrow prongs that connect the spores to the basidia, can measure up to 3 μm in length. The edge of the gill is primarily made up of cheilocystidia (cystidia on the gill edge) but there are also some basidia. The hyaline (translucent) cheilocystidia have an irregular, sometimes vaguely cylindrical shape, and measure between 30 and 80 μm by 3 to 7 μm. They are packed together, extending outwards from the gill in a manner reminiscent of coral, as is sometimes seen in members of the genus Mycena. The abundant caulocystidia (cystidia on the stem) project prominently, and are visible to the naked eye as the minute hairs on the stem. They measure between 30 and 60 μm by 5 to 10 μm. They are swollen in the middle, tapering at each end, but are irregular in shape and are often curved. The particularly thick cell walls can be as much as 2.5 μm wide. The caulocystidia are yellowish-brown. There are a large number of circumcystidia (cystidia found on the margin of the cap), which are similar to the cheilocystidia. They typically have thick cell walls, and numerous projections of various sorts grow from their sides. The circumcystidia form a mass reminiscent of coral.

The flesh in the gills is composed of cylindrical hyphae measuring between 4 and 8 μm thick that run parallel to one another. The hyphae typically have fairly thin, smooth walls, but they can have a small amount of brown pigment, which stains orange-brown in potassium hydroxide. The pileipellis, the uppermost layer of hyphae in the cap, forms a cutis made up of cylindrical, slightly thicker-walled hyphae of between 5 and 10 μm wide. They can be interwoven or primarily extending from the margin to the centre. The pigmentation is yellowish-brown and stains reddish-brown in potassium hydroxide. The hyphae below the pileipellis run parallel to one another and measure between 4 and 8 μm in width. Their yellowish-brown pigment stains orange-brown in potassium hydroxide. The stipitipellis, the uppermost layer of hyphae on the stem, also forms a cutis. The cylindrical hyphae run parallel to one another and have thick cell walls. They have a dark red-brown pigment, which stains darker still in potassium hydroxide. Clamp connections are present.

=== Similar species ===
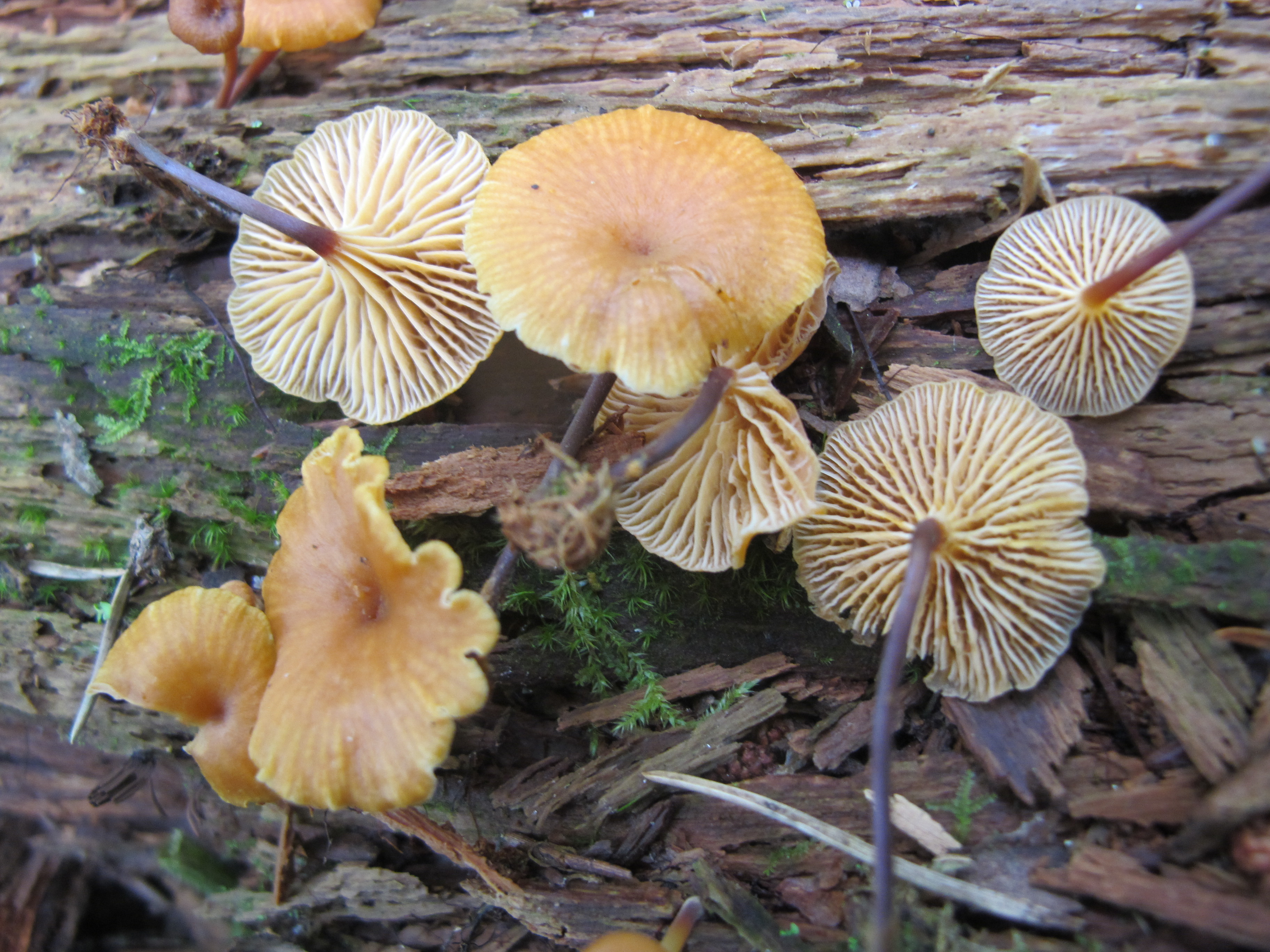
The similar X. cauticinalis

Xeromphalina setulipes shows some similarities to X. cauticinalis. They share the amber-coloured hair towards the base of the stem and both grow on soil, as opposed to directly onto wood. Further, X. cauticinalis can display caulocystidia of the same distinctive shape as those of X. setulipes (though these are mixed with the other shapes more typical of the genus). X. cauticinalis mushrooms are typically of a different colour; for instance, the area at the top of the stem is paler than the rest, compared to the entirely dark stem of X. setulipes. Furthermore, X. cauticinalis has a very bitter taste. X. setulipes shares with X. brunneola its dark colouration and some microscopic traits. However, the two clearly differ in the shape of both the cheilocystidia and the pileocystidia, the width of the spores (the spores of X. brunneola measure between 2 and 3 μm in width) and the fact it is found specifically in softwood woodland. Furthermore, the two do not appear to be closely related.

Other species within Mutabiles include X. campanelloides, which can be differentiated by the shape of the thin-walled caulocystidia and yellow flesh in the stem. X. cornui grows in softwood forests with Sphagnum moss. Both the cap and the top of stem sport yellow grains. X. fraxinophila produces larger mushrooms and has yellow gills. X. parvibulbosa, while potentially featuring similar caulocystidia to X. setulipes, has a bitter or sour taste.

== Habitat, distribution and ecology ==
Xeromphalina setulipes is only known from the type locality in the province of Ciudad Real, Spain. Members of the Mycenaceae are saprotrophic, and X. setulipes was found in woodland made up of cork oak (Quercus suber) and Portuguese oak (Quercus faginea), with undergrowth consisting of gum rockrose (Cistus ladanifer), prickly juniper (Juniperus oxycedrus), and various heathers (Erica species). The mushrooms were growing in clusters on the forest floor from acid soil, surrounded by dead plant matter. The species's ecological patterns may be useful identifying characteristics, distinct from other, similar species. The mushrooms were found in autumn, and collected in November.
