= Fuzzy foot =

Fuzzy foot is a common name shared by several species of mushroom.

- Mycena overholtsii A.H.Sm. & Solheim (1953), also called the snowbank fairy helmet
- Tapinella atrotomentosa (Batsch) Šutara (1992), also called the velvet roll-rim or velvet-footed pax
- Xeromphalina campanella (Batsch) Kühner & Maire 1953, also called the golden trumpet and the bell Omphalina
