= Elizabeth Arnold =

Elizabeth Arnold may refer to:

- Elizabeth Arnold (poet) (1958–2024), American poet
- Elizabeth Arnold (singer), British classical singer
- Elizabeth Arnold (swimmer) (born 1973), British swimmer
- Elizabeth Arnold (children's writer) (born 1944), English children's writer
- Elizabeth Arnold (reporter) (1959/60–2026), American news reporter
- Elizabeth Arnold (scientist), American evolutionary biologist
- Eliza Poe (née Elizabeth Arnold, 1787–1811), English actress and mother of Edgar Allan Poe
- Elisabeth Arnold, Canadian politician
- Elisabeth Arnold (Danish politician)
