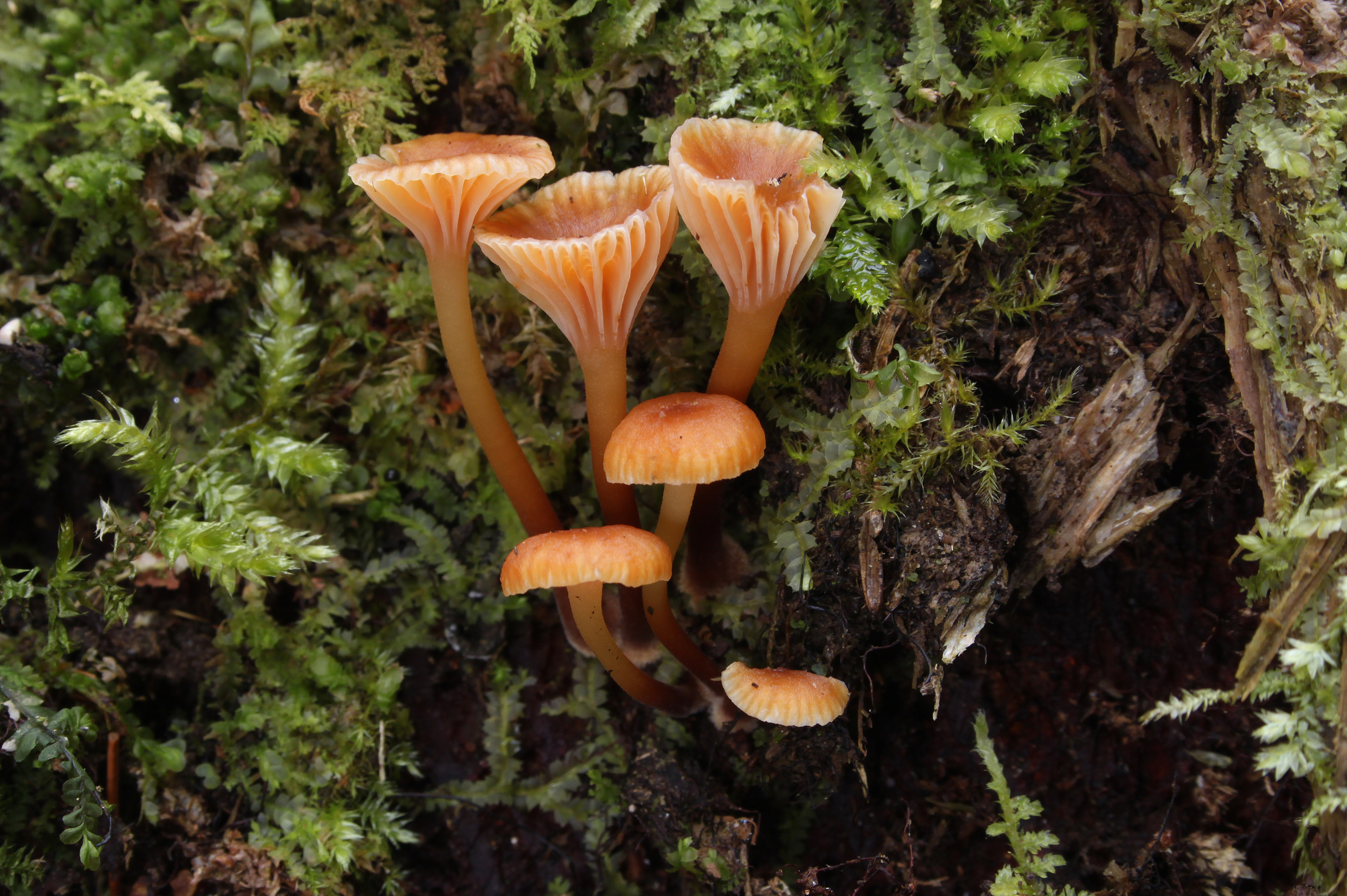

Scientific classification
- Kingdom: Fungi
- Division: Basidiomycota
- Class: Agaricomycetes
- Order: Agaricales
- Family: Mycenaceae
- Genus: Xeromphalina
- Species: X. campanella

Binomial name
- Xeromphalina campanella (Batsch) Kühner & Maire 1953

= Xeromphalina campanella =

Species of fungus

Xeromphalina campanella Mycological characteristics
- Gills on hymenium
- Cap is convex or depressed
- Hymenium is decurrent
- Stipe is bare
- Spore print is white
- Ecology is saprotrophic
- Edibility is unknown or inedible

Xeromphalina campanella is a species of mushroom. Its common names include the golden trumpet and the bell Omphalina. It is a cold-tolerant species found throughout North America and Eurasia.

== Taxonomy ==
The genus name Xeromphalina means "little dry navel" and campanella means "bell-shaped", respectively describing the mature and young shapes of the cap. The mushroom is also called fuzzy-foot.

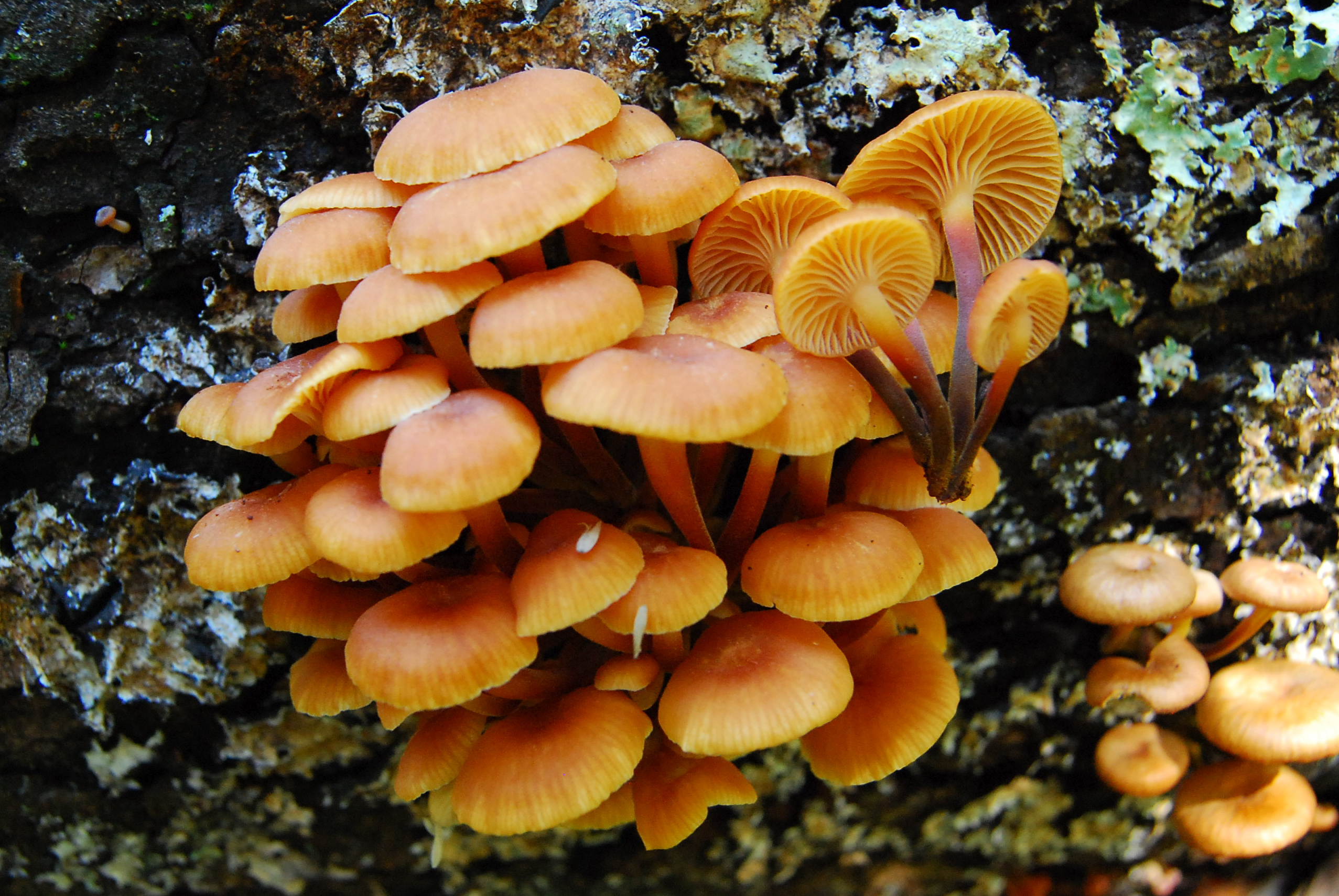
A cluster of X. campanella

== Description ==
The fruit body of X. campanella has a small umbrella-shaped cap, about .5–2 centimetres (1/4–3/4 in) wide. As it matures, the outer part of the cap expands and rises, leaving the center depressed somewhat like a navel. The thin brown stalk is 1–5 cm (1/2–2 in) long and 1–3 millimetres (1/16–1/8 in) wide, yellow at the apex, reddish-brown below, with brown or yellow hairs at the base. The gills are pale yellow to pale orange. The flesh is tannish and mild tasting. The spore print is pale buff.

=== Similar species ===
Xeromphalina campanelloides is distinguishable via microscopic features. Xeromphalina kauffmanii resembles the species, but has a more yellow cap and grows on decaying wood of broad-leaved trees. Xeromphalina brunneola also resembles the species, but has smaller, narrowly elliptical spores, and differs in odor, taste, and cap color. Xeromphalina cauticinalis, X. cornui, and X. fulvipes are also similar.

X. enigmatica looks the same but does not interbreed with it.

== Habitat and distribution ==
The fruiting occurs in clumps or very dense clusters on decaying logs, stumps, and woody debris of coniferous trees. The species is commonly found in North America. At times, the species almost entirely covers old tree stumps. The species can be found in any wet season of the year.

It is found in both Eurasia and North America and has some populations that are geographically separated and reproductively isolated.

== Edibility ==
Although the species is not poisonous, the mushrooms are small and bitter tasting, leading to their often being considered inedible. In 2006, one author noted that they were privately consumed.
