= Bar Karma =

- Created by: Will Wright; Albie Hecht
- Starring: William Sanderson; Matthew Humphreys; Cassie Howarth
- Country of origin: United States
- No. of seasons: 1
- No. of episodes: 12

Production
- Executive producer: Albie Hecht
- Running time: 22 minutes

Original release
- Network: Current TV
- Release: February 11 – April 29, 2011

Bar Karma is the first online community-developed network television series. Online users pitch their ideas for scenes and twists online, using a tool designed by Will Wright called the Storymaker. Some are eventually chosen by the production staff, and utilized to create a new episode every week. The main plot revolves around a bar known as "Bar Karma", a bar that resides someplace in between parallel timelines. Up until now, the typical structure of the shows consists of a patron accidentally walking into or being transported to the bar, where they are shown the consequences of their current life actions, and the potential outcomes for their behavior and choices. This, ultimately, leads to a karmic dilemma, and forces the patron to make a life-altering choice.

In the first episode, Doug Jones suddenly walks into the bar after a one-night stand. He is confused, and thinks that he accidentally fell asleep and is dreaming. When he finally realizes that this is some strange form of reality, James (Sanderson) and Dayna (Howarth) explain to him why he is in the bar, and is given the chance to alter his fate, and the course of "Bar Karma."

== Plot ==
There's a place at the edge of the universe, a venue that's behind time and before space, a watering hole where the tab you run up may never be paid - in this lifetime, at least.

That place is Bar Karma.

Notoriously lucky billionaire Doug Jones wins Bar Karma on a bet. He soon learns that ownership includes more than pouring the perfect cocktail - a lot more. Every happy hour one lost soul wanders through the bar's doors, finding themselves at a karmic crossroads in his or her life. The Bar Karma staff guides their patrons using eerie glimpses into the past, present and many possible futures.

What would happen if you could change your fate? That's the question Bar Karma sets out to answer. The show may begin with "A guy walks into a bar..." but Bar Karma always ends with someone's life being changed...forever.

== Characters ==
Doug Jones
portrayed by Matthew Humphreys
Cocky Internet mogul Doug Jones never intended to own a bar. But when you're made of luck, you tend to win a few pots at the poker table—and one of them included the deed to Bar Karma. Now he's responsible for helping his customers make life-changing decisions. Which is funny, considering that Doug hasn't a clue whether he's made the right decisions himself.

James Anon
portrayed by William Sanderson
Grizzled bartender James has been pouring drinks at Bar Karma for as long as he can remember. For a man who's over 20,000 years old, that's a long time. James has died more than 500 deaths, returning each time with hazy memories of his past lives—and the wrongs he still needs to right.

Dayna Rollins
portrayed by Cassie Howarth
Dayna was once a patron at the bar, facing her own karmic crossroads. Rather than return to her unhappy life on Earth, Dayna made a bold move; she asked James the bartender for a job. Now as the bar's lone waitress and a member of the Bar Karma team, she helps guide customers through their pasts and futures, while keeping herself rooted firmly in the present.

== Episodes ==
No.	Title	Directed by	Written by	Original release date
101	"A Man Walks Into a Bar"	Jonathan Judge	Anna Lotto	February 11, 2011
Billionaire Internet mogul Doug Jones stumbles into a mysterious bar, where the strange waitress and bartender offer him more than a drink—they offer him the chance to change his life.
102	"Once Upon a Timeline"	Jonathan Judge	Patrick Carman, Jeffrey Townsend	February 18, 2011
A writer arrives at Bar Karma and learns that his latest manuscript will inspire an act of terrorism, but he remains unconvinced that a children's book could lead to such violence.
103	"An Open Mind"	Henry S. Miller	Erin Maher, Kay Reindl	February 25, 2011
A hospital patient is summoned to Bar Karma in the middle of a surgical procedure... will she make it out of the operating room alive? Guest Star: Sonja Sohn
104	"Double Blind"	Jonathan Judge	Jill Abbinanti	March 4, 2011
In 2017, a beautiful Brazilian woman arrives at Bar Karma with a mysterious device...but when it's destroyed, it could mean the difference between life and death...
105	"Fair Catch"	Jonathan Judge	Jim Hecht	March 11, 2011
Dayna summons a 1960s football player to Bar Karma who is torn between two women, but when Doug tries to help, he lands in dangerous territory -- the cheerleaders' locker room. Guest Star: Charlie O'Connell
106	"Term Limits"	Jonathan Judge	Polly Draper	March 18, 2011
A US senator from 2058 is hiding a secret from the President that could kill her career and her lover. Guest Star: Polly Draper
107	"The Arrival"	David Kaplan	Patrick Carman, Jeffrey Townsend	March 25, 2011
While most of the universe is dreaming, the jukebox mysteriously allows an unwelcome stranger into Bar Karma, and James must face his deepest fears. Guest Stars: Ken Leung, Tom Noonan
108	"Hack Job"	Christopher Leone	Christopher Leone, Laura Harkcom	April 1, 2011
When Doug tries to stop a hacker from releasing a virus to destroy the Internet, Dayna must take the biggest risk of all...leaving the bar.
109	"Three Times a Lady"	Jonathan Frakes	Anna Lotto	April 8, 2011
When a waitress with multiple personalities enters Bar Karma, the staff must determine which personality has the karmic dilemma and how to help her. Guest Star: Genie Francis
110	"The Day the Music Died"	Henry S. Miller	Jill Abbinanti, Robert Brooks Cohen	April 15, 2011
When a man runs into Bar Karma to escape the police, the staff is scared of what he's hiding in his jacket...until they see it's not a gun, but a drumstick. Guest Star: Doug E. Doug
111	"Enter the Community"	Rosario Roveto	Alan Goodman	April 22, 2011
Worlds collide when a Bar Karma Community Member is the patron at the bar and explores the cosmic choices leading to the series finale.
112	"Man Walks Out of a Bar"	Christopher Leone	Patrick Carman, Jeffrey Townsend	April 29, 2011
Doug returns to the luxury of his former life and is offered a deal on an unusual news organization. But Dayna tries to bring him back by revealing the truth about her past... and why he was brought to Bar Karma in the first place.

== Producers ==
- Will Wright - Co-Creator
- Albie Hecht - Executive Producer
- David Cohn - Current's Executive in Charge
- Laura Knight - Supervising Producer
- Peter Swearengen - Storymaker Producer
