= Zhang Zhang =

Chinese biologist (born 1980)

- 章张
- Born: August 19, 1980 (age 45); Ningxia, China
- Education: Institute of Computing Technology, Chinese Academy of Sciences (Ph.D.); Nanjing University of Science & Technology (M.S.); Ningxia University (B.S.)
- Awards: Distinguished Professor of Chinese Academy of Sciences (2022); UCAS-BHPB Excellent Supervisor Award (2021); Excellence Award in the Final Evaluation of the CAS 100-Talent Program (2017)
- Scientific career
- Fields: Bioinformatics; Computational Biology; Molecular Evolution
- Institutions: National Genomics Data Center (2019-); China National Center for Bioinformation (2019-); University of Chinese Academy of Sciences (2016-); Beijing Institute of Genomics, Chinese Academy of Sciences (2011-); King Abdullah University of Science and Technology (2009-2011); Yale University (2007-2009)
- Doctoral advisor: Jun Yu
- Other academic advisors: Jeffrey Townsend; Vladimir B. Bajic
- Website: NGDC BIG

Zhang Zhang (章张) is a Distinguished Professor of Beijing Institute of Genomics (BIG), Chinese Academy of Sciences (CAS) & China National Center for Bioinformation (CNCB), and acts as Associate Director of the National Genomics Data Center (NGDC), which is part of BIG & CNCB.

== Education ==
Dr. Zhang obtained his PhD degree in Computer Science from Institute of Computing Technology, CAS in 2007, with a bioinformatics joint program with BIG, under the supervision of Jun Yu. Prior to joining BIG, he worked as Postdoctoral Associate at Yale University (advised by Jeffrey Townsend) in United States from 2007~2009 and Research Scientist at King Abdullah University of Science and Technology (advised by Vladimir B. Bajic) in Saudi Arabia from 2009~2011.

== Research ==
In 2011, Dr. Zhang was appointed as Professor in the CAS 100-Talent Program by BIG. He focuses on biological data integration & curation and development of multi-omics data resources and new algorithms & tools. In 2016, Dr. Zhang co-founded the BIG Data Center and served as Executive Director responsible for the center development. In this role, he led the center team to construct a family of database resources and computational methods and to provide a range of data services in support of worldwide research activities. Importantly, he led the center development by setting the organizational structure and directions, establishing the scientific advisory board composed with global field experts, and building interactions and collaborations with worldwide institutions to maximize the scope of data sharing. Based on the BIG Data Center, NGDC and CNCB were officially founded in 2019. Over the past several years, Dr. Zhang developed more than forty database resources and computational tools, organized a series of scientific conferences for promotion of computational biology & bioinformatics domestically and internationally, and raised the general awareness of significant value of database resources as a fundamental infrastructure for biomedical research.

Dr. Zhang published more than 130 papers and his research achievements have been selected in the "Top 10 Advances in Bioinformatics in China". He was an Executive Committee member of the International Society for Biocuration (2015-2018) and now serves as Asian Regional Editor for Briefings in Bioinformatics (2017-) and Associate Editor-in-Chief for Genomics Proteomics & Bioinformatics (2012-). Towards a new paradigm from data to theory, he also works on theoretical biology with new algorithms, models and laws for deciphering basic principles of life.
