= Lee Oras Overholts =

American mycologist (1890–1946)

- Born: June 23, 1890; Camden, Ohio, U.S.A
- Died: November 10, 1946 (aged 56); State College, Pennsylvania
- Education: Washington University in St. Louis
- Spouse(s): Flora May Conarroe (d.1944); Marie Knautz
- Children: 4
- Scientific career
- Fields: mycology
- Workplaces: Pennsylvania State University
- Thesis: (1915)
- Author abbrev. (botany): Overh.

Lee Oras Overholts (23 June 1890 – 10 November 1946) was an American mycologist known for his expertise on polypore fungi.

== Personal life ==
Lee Oras Overholts was born in Camden, Ohio and attended Miami University, where he received a Bachelor of Arts degree in 1912. His postgraduate education was at Washington University where his Ph.D. was awarded in 1915.

He was married twice, to Flora May Conarroe (died 7 June 1944) and then Marie Knautz. He had four children, two girls and two boys.

Overholts died 10 November 1946 at State College after a very short illness although he had been unwell for the five previous years.

== Scientific career ==
During the course of his graduate school research, he met prominent mycologists such as Bruce Fink, Frank Dunn Kern, and Edward Angus Burt and developed an interest in the polypores. In 1915 Overholts accepted the offer of a faculty post at Pennsylvania State University from Kern. He started teaching courses in botany, and later in mycology and forest pathology. He became a full professor in 1925.

Overholts described 35 polypore fungi either alone or with his colleague Josiah Lincoln Lowe. However, Overholts often neglected to include a Latin description, contrary to the then-prevailing rules of botanical nomenclature, and consequently a large proportion of his species were published invalidly.

== Awards and recognition ==
Overholts was the vice president of the Mycological Society of America in 1937, and its president in 1938. Several fungal taxa been named in his honor:

- Clitocybe overholtsii Murrill 1916
- Mycena overholtsii A.H.Sm. & Solheim 1953
- Peniophora overholtsii Burt 1926
- Phellinus overholtsii Ginns 1984
- Poria overholtsii Pilát 1940

== Selected works ==
- Overholts L.O. (1914). "The Polyporaceae of Ohio". Annals of the Missouri Botanical Garden. 1 (1): 81–155. Bibcode:1914AnMBG...1...81O. doi:10.2307/2990008. JSTOR 2990008.
- Overholts L.O. (1915). "Comparative studies in the Polyporaceae". Annals of the Missouri Botanical Garden. 2 (4): 667–730. Bibcode:1915AnMBG...2..667O. doi:10.2307/2989954. hdl:2027/osu.32435011307675. JSTOR 2989954.
- Overholts L.O. (1924). "Pholiota". North American Flora. 1924: 261–276.
- Overholts L.O. (1927). "A monograph of the genus Pholiota in the United States". Annals of the Missouri Botanical Garden. 14 (2): 87–210. Bibcode:1927AnMBG..14...87O. doi:10.2307/2394091. hdl:2027/mdp.39015052524470. JSTOR 2394091.
- J. Ben Hill, Lee Overholts and Henry W. Popp (1936) Botany, A textbook for Colleges 672pp McGraw Hill Book Company
- Overholts, L.O. (1953). The Polyporaceae of the United States, Alaska and Canada. University of Michigan Studies 19: 466 pp.

== See also ==
- List of mycologists
