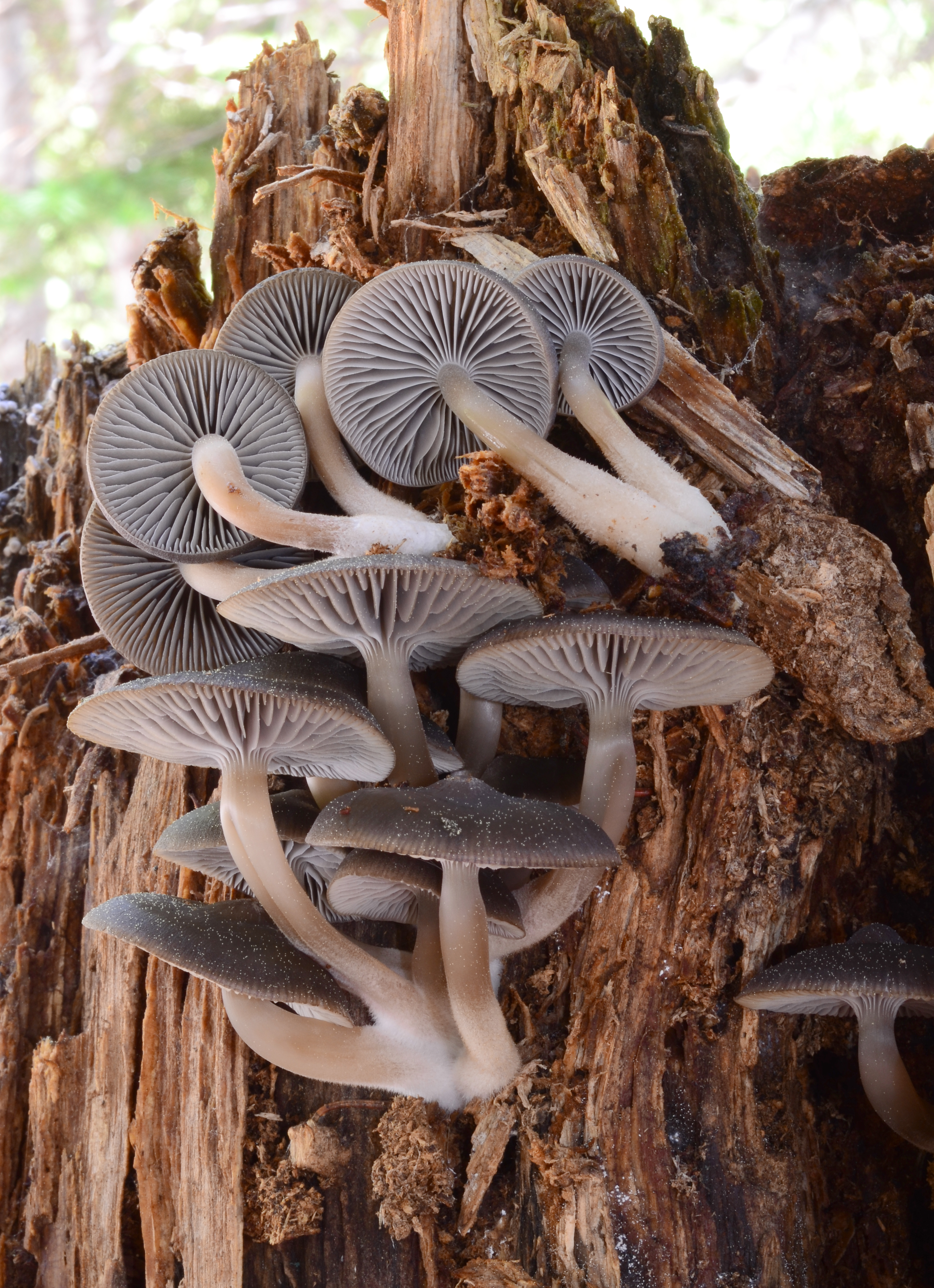

Scientific classification
- Domain: Eukaryota
- Kingdom: Fungi
- Division: Basidiomycota
- Class: Agaricomycetes
- Order: Agaricales
- Family: Mycenaceae
- Genus: Mycena
- Species: M. overholtsii

Binomial name
- Mycena overholtsii A.H.Sm. & Solheim (1953)

= Mycena overholtsii =

Species of fungus

Mycena overholtsii Mycological characteristics
- Gills on hymenium
- Cap is convex
- Hymenium is adnate or adnexed
- Stipe is bare
- Spore print is white
- Ecology is saprotrophic
- Edibility is unknown

Mycena overholtsii, commonly known as the snowbank fairy helmet or fuzzy foot, is a species of fungus in the family Mycenaceae. The mushrooms produced by the fungus are relatively large for the genus Mycena, with convex grayish caps up to 5 cm (2 in) in diameter and stems up to 15 cm (6 in) long. The gills on the underside of the cap are whitish to pale gray, and initially closely spaced before becoming well-spaced at maturity after the cap enlarges. The mushrooms are characterized by the dense covering of white "hairs" on the base of the stem. M. overholtsii is an example of a snowbank fungus, growing on well-decayed conifer logs near snowbanks, during or just after snowmelt. Formerly known only from high-elevation areas of western North America, particularly the Rocky Mountain and Cascade regions, it was reported for the first time in Japan in 2010. The edibility of the mushroom is unknown. M. overholtsii can be distinguished from other comparable species by differences in location, or spore size.

== History and naming ==
The species was first described by mycologists Alexander H. Smith and Wilhelm Solheim in 1953, on the basis of specimens collected in the Medicine Bow Mountains of Albany County, Wyoming. The specific epithet honors the early 20th-century American mycologist Lee Oras Overholts. It is commonly known as the "snowbank fairy helmet", or "fuzzy foot", although it shares the latter name with Tapinella atrotomentosa and Xeromphalina campanella. M. overholtsii has been given the Japanese name yukitsutsumikunugitake.

== Description ==
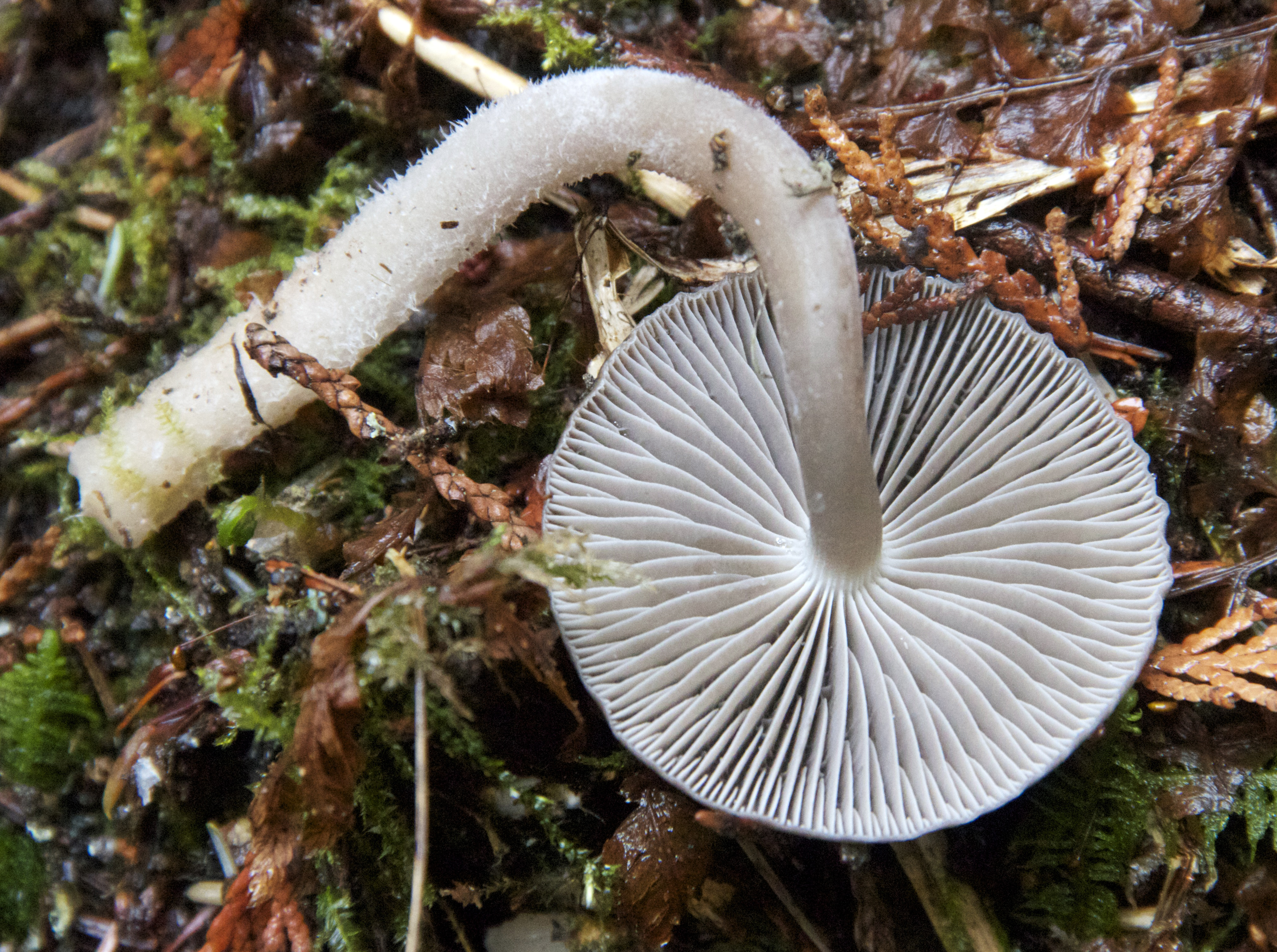
View of the gills and tomentose stem

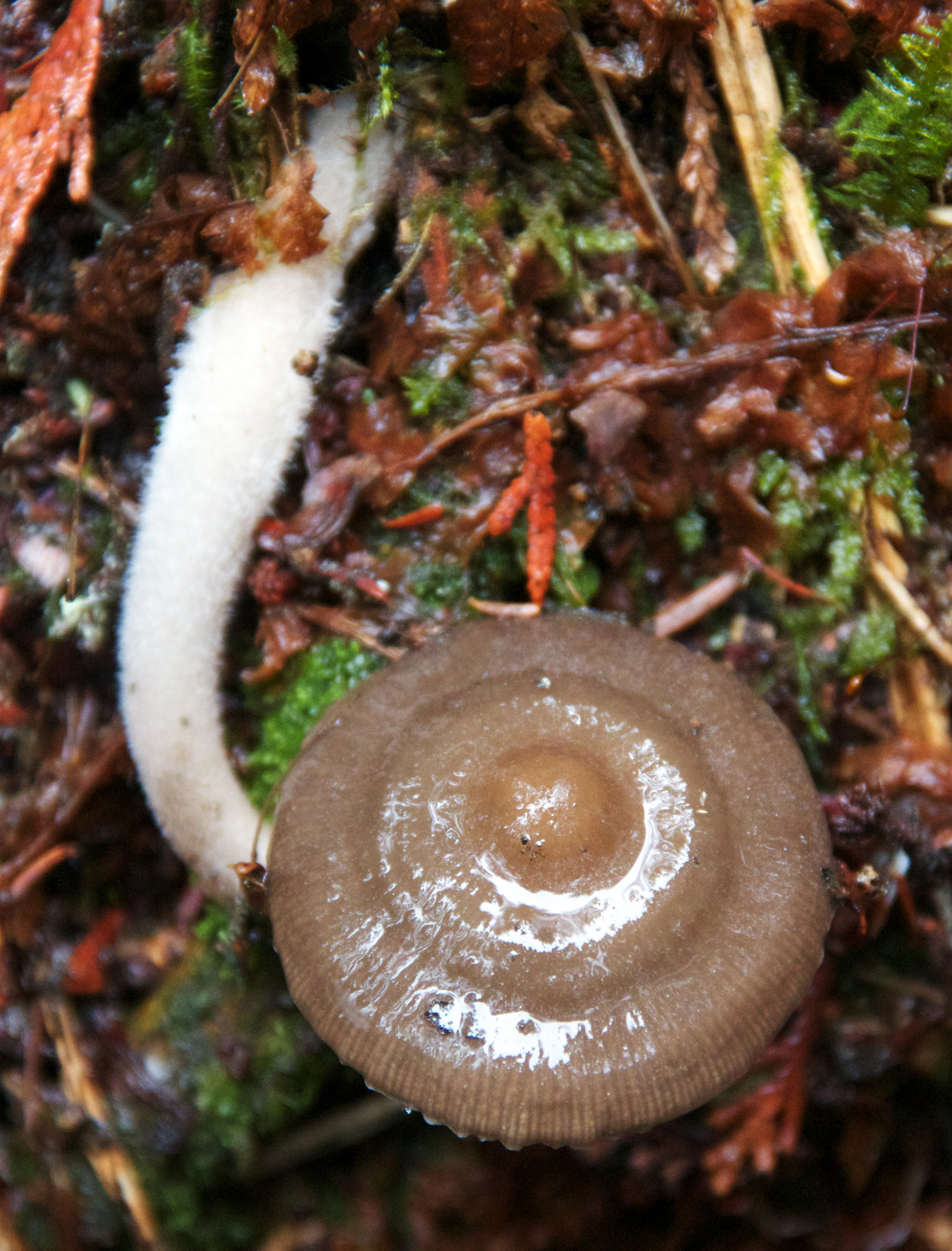
The cap of this mature specimen has a broad umbo, and radial striations on the margin.

Mycena overholtsii produces some of the largest mushrooms of the genus Mycena. They have caps that are 1.5 to 5 cm (1/2 to 2 in) in diameter, and convex in shape, developing an umbo (a central protrusion resembling a nipple) in maturity. The cap surface is smooth, moist, and marked with radial striations. The caps are somewhat hygrophanous, and depending on age and state of hydration, range in color from brown or grayish-brown, to dark or bluish-gray. The mushroom flesh is thin and watery, with a light gray color.

The gills have an adnate, adnexed, or shallowly decurrent attachment to the stem, and are initially closely spaced before becoming well-spaced at maturity. They have a whitish to pale gray color, and will stain gray when they are bruised. There are three or four tiers of lamellulae (short gills that do not extend fully from the cap margin to the stem) interspersed between the gills. The stem is 4 to 15 cm (1 1/2 to 6 in) long by 0.3 to 1 cm (1/8 to 3/8 in) thick, and tapers upward so that the stem apex is slightly thinner than the base. It can be straight or curved, has cartilage-like flesh, and is hollow in maturity. When growing on soft, well-decayed wood, the stem often penetrates deeply into the substrate. The stem is pinkish-brown in color, and the lower half is tomentose – densely covered with white, woolly hairs. The mushroom has a yeast-like odor and a mild taste; its edibility is unknown, but it is not considered poisonous.

=== Microscopic characteristics ===
Viewed in deposit, as with a spore print, the spores appear white. Microscopically, the spores are roughly elliptical, sometimes appearing bean-shaped, with dimensions of 5.5–7 by 3–3.5 μm. They are thin-walled and smooth, and bear an indistinct hilar appendage. The spores are amyloid, meaning they will absorb iodine and turn black to blue-black when stained with Melzer's reagent. The basidia (spore-bearing cells) are four-spored. The cheilocystidia (cystidia on the gill edge), which are scattered and interspersed with basidia, are roughly cylindric to fusoid (spindle-shaped), smooth, hyaline (translucent), and measure 45–65 by 2–5.5 μm. Pleurocystidia (cystidia on the gill face) are uncommon, and similar in appearance to the cheilocystidia. The cap cuticle is an ixocutis (a fungal tissue type in which the hyphae are gelatinous and lie flat) with mostly smooth hyphae that are 1.5–3.5 μm in diameter. The cap flesh is dextrinoid, meaning it will turn reddish-brown in Melzer's reagent. Clamp connections are present in the hyphae of M. overholtsii.

=== Similar species ===
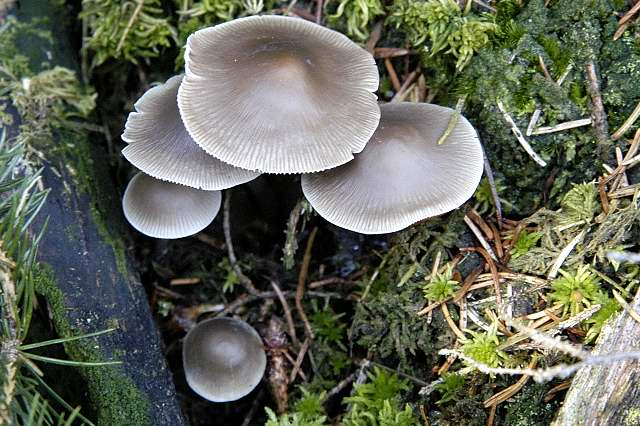
M. maculata

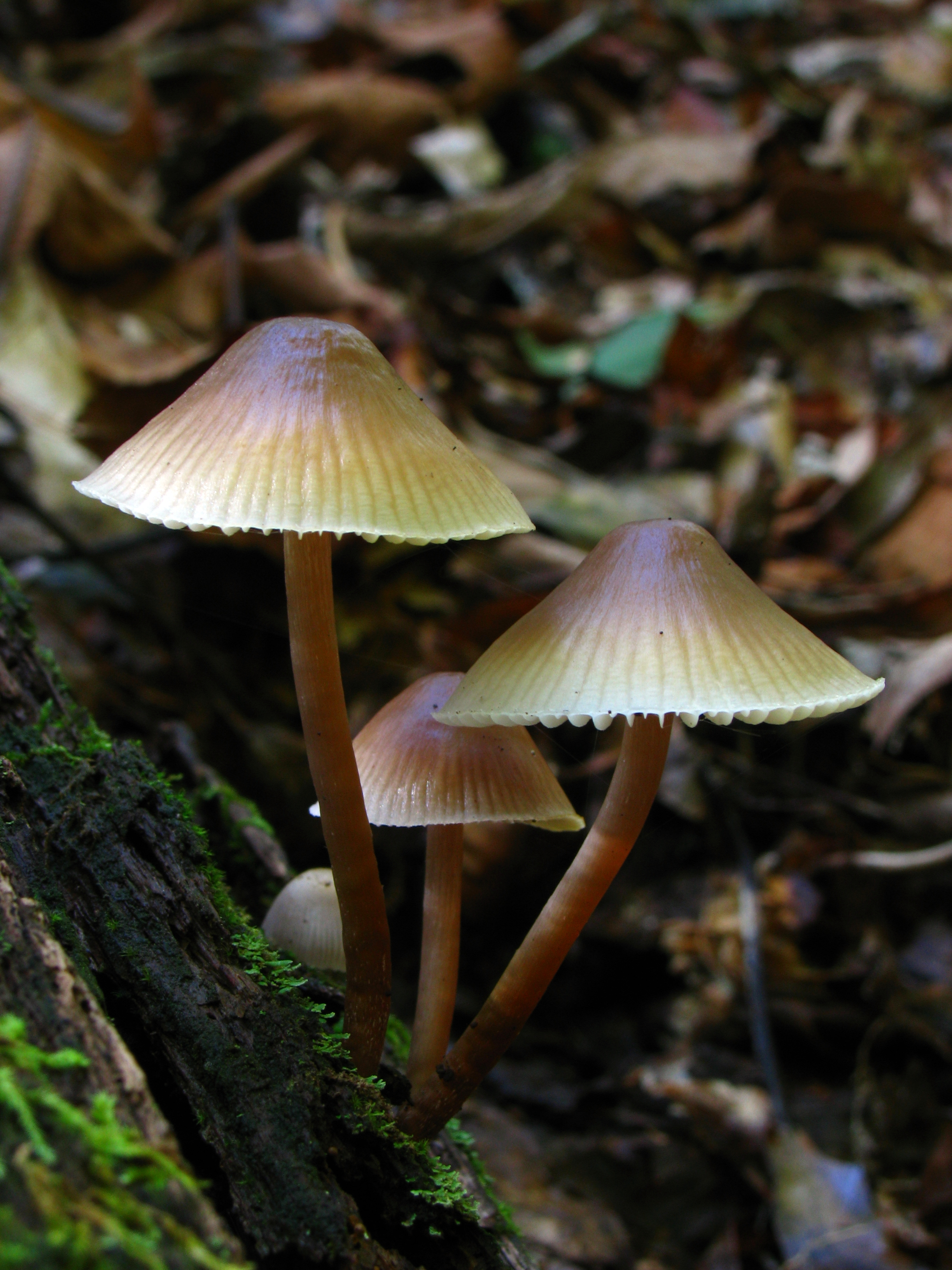
M. galericulata

Other similar mycenas that grow in clusters on wood include M. maculata and M. galericulata. The fruit bodies of M. maculata often develop red stains as they mature, but this characteristic is inconsistent and cannot be reliably used for identification. Its spores are larger than that of M. overholtsii, measuring 7–10 by 4–6 μm. M. galericulata is very similar in appearance to M. maculata, but does not undergo reddish staining; its spores are 8–12 by 5.5–9 μm. Another similar species is M. semivestipes, which can be distinguished by its bleach-like odor, an eastern North American distribution, fruiting season during summer and autumn, and small spores measuring 4–5 by 2.5–3 μm.

== Habitat and distribution ==
This species is sometimes found singly, but more often in clusters on well-rotted conifer logs and stumps (often Douglas-fir) near melting snowbanks, or sometimes in moist snow chambers formed by receding snow. Cool nighttime temperatures reduce the snowmelt rate, and help ensure that spores released by the mushroom will be dispersed into the soil. The mushroom is common in western North America, particularly the Pacific Northwest, the Rocky Mountains and the Cascade mountains. It has been reported in four US states: South Dakota, California, Washington and Wyoming, but is not known in Oregon. It is also found in western Canada. The mushroom is restricted to areas with minimum elevations of 1,000 m (3,300 ft). In 2010, it was reported growing in the boreal coniferous forests of Hokkaido, Japan, in plantations of Sakhalin fir (Abies sachalinensis), as well as in natural forests dominated by both Sakhalin fir and Jezo spruce (Picea jezoensis). In North America, the mushroom usually appears between March and July; Japanese collections were made in May. The fruiting period can be prolonged, especially in areas with heavy snowfall, or at high elevations where the snowmelt is delayed.
