= John W. Taylor =

John W. Taylor may refer to:

- John W. Taylor (Mormon) (1858–1916), apostle of The Church of Jesus Christ of Latter-day Saints
- John W. Taylor (politician) (1784–1854), early nineteenth-century American politician
- John Wilkinson Taylor (educator) (1906–2001), acting head of UNESCO, 1952–1953
- John Wilkinson Taylor (politician) (1855–1934), early British Labour politician
- John W. Taylor (professor) (born 1950), American mycologist researching fungal evolution

== See also ==
- John Taylor (disambiguation)
