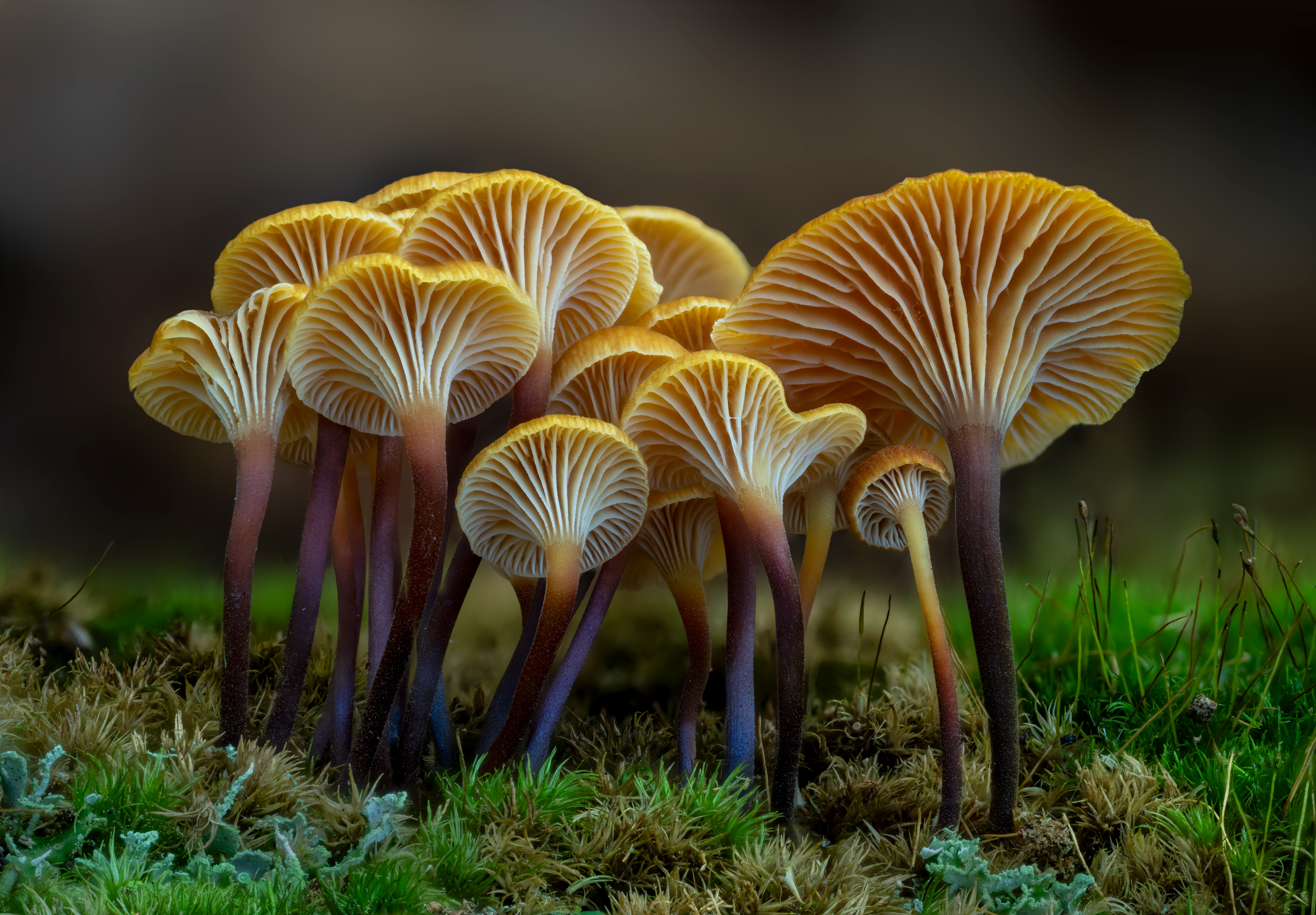
- Xeromphalina sp.

Scientific classification
- Kingdom: Fungi
- Division: Basidiomycota
- Class: Agaricomycetes
- Order: Agaricales
- Family: Mycenaceae
- Genus: Xeromphalina; Kühner & Maire (1934)

Type species
- Xeromphalina campanella (Batsch) Kühner & Maire (1934)

Synonyms
- Omphalopsis Earle (1909); Phlebomarasmius R.Heim (1967); Valentinia Velen. (1939)

= Xeromphalina =

Genus of fungi

Xeromphalina is a genus of fungi in the family Mycenaceae. The genus has a widespread distribution, and contains about 30 species.

Adults of the pleasing fungus beetle Tritoma humeralis have been recorded from an undetermined species of Xeromphalinus, but it does not seem to be a regular food source for them.

== Species ==
- X. amara
- X. aspera
- X. austroandina
- X. brunneola
- X. campanella
- X. campanelloides
- X. cauticinalis
- X. cirris
- X. cornui
- X. curtipes
- X. disseminata
- X. fraxinophila
- X. fulvipes
- X. helbergeri
- X. javanica
- X. junipericola
- X. kauffmanii
- X. leonina
- X. melizea
- X. mesopora
- X. nubium
- X. nudicaulis
- X. orickiana
- X. picta
- X. podocarpi
- X. pruinatipes
- X. pumanquensis
- X. racemosa
- X. setulipes
- X. tenuipes
- X. tropicalis
- X. testacea
- X. yungensis
