= George Baker Cummins =

American mycologist (1904-2007)

- Born: August 29, 1904; Tecumseh, Nebraska
- Died: March 20, 2007 (aged 102); Tucson, Arizona
- Education: Montana State University; University of Michigan
- Scientific career
- Fields: Mycology

George Baker Cummins (August 29, 1904 – March 30, 2007) was a notable American mycologist and was considered an authority on the rust fungi. At his death he was the last surviving charter member of the Mycological Society of America.

== Career ==
George Baker Cummins was affectionately known as "Mr. Rust" and he was recognized throughout the world as the authority on the rust fungi, the Puccinales, which are the largest order of disease-causing organisms of plants. Cummins professional specialty for almost his entire career was the taxonomy, biology and geographic distribution of the rust fungi. His investigations of the rusts took him to the Philippines, New Guinea, continental China, the Himalaya, central and western Africa, and North and South America.

Cummins began his mycological career at the age of 23 as a graduate student at the University of Michigan in 1927, meaning he was a mycologist for 80 years. He published his first journal paper in 1930 at the age of 26 and his last publication was the Illustrated Genera of Rust Fungi in 2003 at the age of 99.

Cummins studied the rust fungi at the internationally renowned Arthur Herbarium (Fungarium) at Purdue University, a collection dedicated to preserved specimens of rust fungi. He first came to Purdue University in 1930, as a research assistant under J. C. Arthur (another noted urediniologist to which the Arthur Fungarium owes its namesake) and worked with Arthur on Arthur's rust fungi monograph, published in 1934. Cummins was never a student of Arthur's although he gained a wealth of knowledge of rust fungi while working with him on the manual. He completed his PhD program at Purdue, working with several advisors, in 1935. Cummins was staff or faculty in the college of Agriculture, and the Agricultural Experiment Station at Purdue, for 40 years. He served as curator of the Arthur from 1938 - 1971 and built it to be one of the largest working collections of plant rust fungi in the world. With Wilhelm Solheim he issued several fascicles (cent.) of the exsiccata series Mycoflora Saximontanensis exsiccata. The collection is especially rich in grasses, partly due to the interest of Cummins in collecting hosts for grass rusts. Cummins named over 600 new taxa or combinations in his 33-year career as curator. He was appointed professor in 1947 and was head of the Department of Botany and Plant Pathology from 1966 to 1970, when he retired.

Cummins was active in teaching and instructed courses in general plant sciences and mycology. In collaboration with other departmental faculty he authored a textbook and laboratory manuals in plant sciences. He also served as major professor for graduate students in master's and doctoral programs. His students included J. W. Baxter, Y. Hiratsuka and J. F. Hennen. After retirement from Purdue Cummins moved to Tucson, Arizona, where he was appointed visiting research professor by the Department of Plant Pathology of the University of Arizona and was provided working facilities and microscopic equipment in the mycological herbarium. For the next 20 years he was a valued and highly productive faculty member.

== Memberships and awards ==
Cummins held all of the offices of the Mycological Society of America; secretary treasurer (1942–1944), vice president (1945), president (1946) and councilor (1947–1948). He was also active in the American Phytopathological Society of America, the Mycological Society of Mexico, the Torrey Botanical Club, American Society of Plant Taxonomists, the Southwestern Association of Naturalists, the Indiana Academy of Science, and the International Association for Plant Taxonomy. He was made a Life Member of the Mycological Society of America in 1967 and was the longest surviving charter member. His achievements were recognized by Montana State University (where he received a B.S. degree) when they conferred upon him an Honorary Doctor of Science degree in 1963. He became an Emeritus Professor at Purdue in 1971 and in recognition as the foremost authority on the rust fungi, Purdue University awarded him an honorary doctoral degree in 1981. Several other universities also awarded him honorary degrees including the Banco Nacional of Mexico which named him "Mencion honorifica" in 1982.

== Contributions and literary works ==
Outstanding contributions by Cummins include a study of the phylogenetic significance of the pores in rust urediniospores, a monograph of the genus Prospodium, an illustrated manual of rust genera, and studies of major groups of grass rusts, some cooperatively with H. C. Greene and J. F. Hennen (Baxter, 1962).

During his tenure at Purdue, and at the University of Arizona since his retirement, he published 120 refereed papers and 9 books. The books published include Rust Fungi on Legumes and Composites in North America (1978), The Rust Fungi of Cereals, Grasses and Bamboos (1971), three books on rust fungi of Mexico with Hector M. Gallegos and three editions of the Illustrated Genera of Rust Fungi with Yasuyuki Hiratsuka.

Cummins was also a talented scientific illustrator and J.C. Arthur's 1934 Manual of the Rust Fungi contains his illustrations. There are hundreds of original illustrations by Cummins throughout the collection in the Arthur Fungarium.

== Personal life and character ==
Cummins was born in Tecumseh, Nebraska, 29 August 1904 to Nellie Baker Cummins and George Wilson Cummins. He had a sister, Ruth, who was three years older. In 1906 his family moved to western Montana. Cummins' father had purchased a 100-acre farm on the edge of the village of Darby at the south end of the Bitterroot Valley, on which his father built a two-level log house. This building now acts as the administration building for the Darby School system on the aptly named Cummins street.

Cummins attended Montana state college (Now Montana State University) in Bozeman. He began his career as an engineering major but after a year changed his major to botany and bacteriology. In the summers during his college years Cummins and a classmate friend from Darby worked for the U.S. Department of Agriculture in the barberry eradication program for control of stem rust of wheat. This was Cummins' first rust-related employment.

Cummins was awarded a bachelor of science in Botany and Bacteriology from MSC in 1927. One of the botany professors at MSC was Frank B. Cotner, a student of the mycologist C. H. Kauffman at the University of Michigan. Cotner was impressed by Cummins and urged him to consider graduate work in mycology and helped him get an assistantship with Kauffman at Michigan. Cummins started a graduate program there in fall 1927. About the time Cummins finished his MS, E.B. Mains, then a faculty member at Purdue University, contacted his former mentor, Kauffman, at Michigan to ask whether anyone there was qualified and interested in working at Purdue with the noted rust specialist J.C. Arthur in preparing a manual of the rust fungi of North America. Kauffman recommended Cummins and Cummins decided to take the job. He went to Purdue in January 1930 to assume a position on the Agricultural Experiment Station staff as a research assistant.

In the fall of 1930 Cummins married Margaret Sempill and together they had two children, Richard in 1934 and Elaine in 1936. Sadly Margaret died shortly after Elaine was born. In 1938 Cummins married Mildred Shriver, a Purdue alumna, who became the loving mother of two small children and Cummins' devoted wife for the next 69 years. In summer 1957 Cummins spent several weeks collecting rust fungi in the Chiricahua Mountains and adjacent areas in southeastern Arizona, working out of the Southwestern Research Station of the American Museum of Natural History. In 1960 he spent a sabbatical year in Tucson doing field research on rusts in southern Arizona and northern Mexico. These experiences led to a permanent move by Cummins and Mildred to Tucson in 1971 after his retirement from Purdue.

Cummins has been noted as the best softball pitcher in the Purdue University School of Agriculture and a man of dry wit, who signed his letters "the burned-out botanist" (Mccain & Hennen, 1993). Below is a quote from Cummins from the Purdue University Retiree Newsletter: "... The abbreviation of Purdue University Retirees (PUR) is antedated by some years by PUR, the official international designation for the Arthur. The two PUR's have something in common. The PUR (Arthur Herbarium) is a repository of about 80,000 specimens, many quite old. Purdue University Retirees probably do not number so many, but the rest of the comparison has some validity. And I am in a position to know."

Dr. George Baker Cummins died on March 30, 2007, at the age of 102. "Dr. George B. Cummins is a scholar, a gentlemen, and a scientist of international fame. His contributions to Purdue University, Indiana, the United States, and the world have been enormous." - Dr. Markus Scholler (former curator of the Arthur Fungarium)

Mildred died 22 August 2008 at the age of 101. She and Cummins are survived by son Richard, daughter Elaine Cummins Yankula, six grandchildren and eight great-grandchildren, including a set of triplets.
