= Anne Pringle (scientist) =

American biologist

- Education: Duke University
- Scientific career
- Thesis: Ecology and genetics of arbuscular mycorrhizal fungi (2001)

Anne Pringle is an American mycologist and the L&S Mary Herman Rubinstein and Vilas Distinguished Achievement Professor of Botany at the University of Wisconsin, Madison. She is known for her work examining ecology and evolution using fungi as model organisms . Pringle was elected a fellow of the American Association for the Advancement of Science in 2025.

== Education and career ==
Pringle received an A.B. from the University of Chicago in 1993. In 2001 she earned her Ph.D. from Duke University where her studies were in botany. Following her PhD. she was a fellow at the University of California, Berkeley until she joined the faculty at Harvard University. In 2015 Pringle moved to the University of Wisconsin, Madison where she was promoted to professor in 2017. As of 2025, she is the Letters & Science Mary Herman Rubinstein Professor and the Vilas Distinguished Achievement Professor of Botany.

== Research ==
Pringle's early research examined diversity in arbuscular mycorrhiza, a fungus that lives in close association with plants. She has examined the distribution of fungus including a human pathogenic fungus, ectomycorrhizal fungus that live with plants, and lichens that grow on tombstones. Her research includes investigations into how fungal species move in the environment. Pringle also participates in science events to promote knowledge about fungi, shares her knowledge about fungus with children's newspapers, and talks with the public on whiskey fungus, by-product of alcohol distilling.

== Selected publications ==
- Pringle, Anne; Taylor, John W. (2002-10-01). "The fitness of filamentous fungi". Trends in Microbiology. 10 (10): 474–481. doi:10.1016/S0966-842X(02)02447-2. ISSN 0966-842X. PMID 12377558.
- Pringle, A.; Baker, D. M.; Platt, J. L.; Wares, J. P.; Latgé, J. P.; Taylor, J. W. (2005). "Cryptic Speciation in the Cosmopolitan and Clonal Human Pathogenic Fungus Aspergillus Fumigatus". Evolution. 59 (9): 1886–1899. doi:10.1111/j.0014-3820.2005.tb01059.x. ISSN 0014-3820. PMID 16261727.
- Pringle, Anne; Bever, James D.; Gardes, Monique; Parrent, Jeri L.; Rillig, Matthias C.; Klironomos, John N. (2009-12-01). "Mycorrhizal Symbioses and Plant Invasions". Annual Review of Ecology, Evolution, and Systematics. 40 (1): 699–715. doi:10.1146/annurev.ecolsys.39.110707.173454. ISSN 1543-592X.
- Hoeksema, Jason D.; Chaudhary, V. Bala; Gehring, Catherine A.; Johnson, Nancy Collins; Karst, Justine; Koide, Roger T.; Pringle, Anne; Zabinski, Catherine; Bever, James D.; Moore, John C.; Wilson, Gail W. T.; Klironomos, John N.; Umbanhowar, James (2010). "A meta-analysis of context-dependency in plant response to inoculation with mycorrhizal fungi". Ecology Letters. 13 (3): 394–407. Bibcode:2010EcolL..13..394H. doi:10.1111/j.1461-0248.2009.01430.x. ISSN 1461-023X. PMID 20100237.
- Morrison, Eric W.; Frey, Serita D.; Sadowsky, Jesse J.; van Diepen, Linda T. A.; Thomas, W. Kelley; Pringle, Anne (2016-10-01). "Chronic nitrogen additions fundamentally restructure the soil fungal community in a temperate forest". Fungal Ecology. 23: 48–57. Bibcode:2016FunE...23...48M. doi:10.1016/j.funeco.2016.05.011. ISSN 1754-5048.

== Awards and honors ==
In 2018 Pringle was named a fellow of the Mycological Society of America. Pringle was elected a fellow of the American Association for the Advancement of Science in 2025.
