= Martha J. Powell =

American Mycologist, Distinguished Professor of Botany

- Born: January 27, 1948; Charlotte, North Carolina
- Died: June 20, 2023 (aged 75)
- Education: Ph.D. University of North Carolina Chapel Hill 1974
- Spouse: Will H. Blackwell
- Scientific career
- Fields: Biology; Mycology
- Workplaces: Miami University; James Madison University; The University of Alabama
- Author abbrev. (botany): M.J.Powell

Martha Jane Powell (27 January 1948 – 20 June 2023) was an American Mycologist, Distinguished Professor of Botany at Miami University, and Chairman of the Biological Sciences Department at The University of Alabama. Powell was an elected fellow at the Mycological Society of America and served as Treasurer, Vice President, President, and Program Director for the organization.

== Personal life ==
Powell was born in Charlotte, North Carolina to parents John James and Martha Lee Powell. She was inspired to study mycology by the glow of Omphalotus olearius mushrooms she had placed in her bedroom after finding them in the woods.

Powell met her husband, Will H. Blackwell, while working at Miami University.

== Career ==
Powell attended Sylva-Webster High School before graduating with a degree in science education from Western Carolina University in 1969. She completed her Ph.D. in Botany at UNC Chapel Hill in 1974, where she studied under William Koch and John Nathaniel Couch. After completion of her Ph.D., she worked with Charles E. Bracker at Purdue University as a postdoctoral researcher.

Powell started at Miami University as an assistant professor in 1976.

Powell was awarded the Mycological Society of America (MSA) C. J. Alexopoulos Prize in 1981, an award for outstanding early career mycologists. She later went on to hold roles of Treasurer from 1986 to 1989, Vice President in 1989, President in 1991, and Program Director at MSA. Powell was elected as an MSA fellow in 2006.

In 1994, Powell was named a Distinguished Professor of Botany at Miami University. Powell became the Chairman of the Biological Sciences department at The University of Alabama in 1997.

In 2011, Powell won The University of Alabama's Blackmon-Moody Outstanding Professor Award for strengthening undergraduate education in the sciences.

Powell published over 140 times, demonstrating commitment to her field.

== Awards ==
- 1981 - Mycological Society of America C. J. Alexopoulos Prize
- 2011 - The University of Alabama Blackmon-Moody Outstanding Professor Award
- 2014 – Western Carolina Academic Achievement Award
