= Bryce Kendrick =

English-Canadian biologist (born 1933)

Bryce Kendrick (born 1933) is an English-Canadian biologist, who spent the majority of his career in Canada, principally at the University of Waterloo in Ontario.

== Biography ==
Kendrick was born in Liverpool in 1933. After completing his bachelor's degree (1955) and Ph.D. (1958) at the University of Liverpool, he took an assignment as a postdoctoral fellow with the Plant Research Institute of Agriculture Canada in Ottawa, Canada, remaining there as a research officer until 1965, when he accepted a position as assistant professor in the biology department at the University of Waterloo in Ontario. The following year he became as associate professor, and in 1971 he was made a full professor. He received his D.Sc. from the University of Liverpool in 1980. From 1985 he was Waterloo's associate dean for graduate affairs. Kendrick retired from the University of Waterloo and received a distinguished professor emeritus in 1994. He moved to Sidney, British Columbia, maintaining adjunct professorships at both the University of Waterloo and University of Victoria. He continues to consult and publish in his field; since 2004 he has been the technical advisor for Aerobiology Laboratory Associates in Reston, Virginia.

Kendrick wrote several books, and over 300 publications, including a textbook about fungi, The Fifth Kingdom.

== Honours ==
- U.K. Science Council Senior Visiting Scholarship 1974
- Guggenheim Fellowship 1979
- Distinguished Visiting Scholar, University of Adelaide 1979
- Fellow of the Royal Society of Canada 1981
- Distinguished Research Fellow, Foundation for Research Development, South Africa 1990
- Visiting Fellow, Foundation for Research Development, South Africa. 1992
- Sir. C.V. Raman Visiting Professorship, University of Madras. 1993
- Hon. Secretary, Academy of Science, Royal Society of Canada 1985–1991
- Distinguished Professor Emeritus, University of Waterloo 1995
- Distinguished Mycologist Award, Mycological Society of America 1996
- Centenary Fellow, British Mycological Society 1996
- Lawson Medal, Canadian Botanical Association 2001

== See also ==
- List of University of Waterloo people
