= Robert W. Lichtwardt =

American mycologist

Robert W. Lichtwardt (November 27, 1924 – February 9, 2018) was a Brazilian-American mycologist specializing in the study of arthropod-associated, gut-dwelling fungi (trichomycetes). He is known for his online monograph and interactive keys to trichomycete taxa.

== Family life ==
Lichtwardt was born in Rio de Janeiro, Brazil to American parents, and consequently had dual citizenship to both countries. As a child he made only a few trips to the U.S. with his parents, graduating from the American School of Rio de Janeiro high school in 1941 but permanently relocating to the US to attend college in 1945. When World War II began, he served for several years at the Embassy in a disbursing position at the Naval Operating Base for the South Atlantic in Rio.

== Education ==
After moving to Ohio in 1945, Lichtwardt began his undergraduate studies at Oberlin College and graduated in 1949 with a Bachelor of Arts degree. After taking a field biology course taught by George T. Jones, Lichtwardt decided to pursue a master's degree in botany, with an emphasis in Mycology, at the University of Illinois. He received his M.S. in 1951, and then his Ph.D. in 1954 both in Botany with a Mycology emphasis. His Ph.D. advisor was Leland Shanor, who suggested trichomycetes as a study subject. Specifically, Lichtwardt focused his research on species of Enterobryus. Enterobryus species are millipede gut-associated microorganisms that were confirmed as non-fungal protists in 2005, but share morphological traits with the fungal trichomycetes. Collections of millipede hosts used in Lichtwardt's thesis research were made at the University of Michigan Biological Station, Douglas Lake, Michigan, the Highlands Biological Station, Highlands, North Carolina, and from Champaign County, Illinois

While taking an undergraduate course in field biology at Oberlin, Lichtwardt met his future wife Betty Thomas. They were married in 1951 and have two children

== Career ==
Lichtwardt was among the first to receive the newly offered post-doctoral fellowships from the National Science Foundation in 1954. He used the funds to pursue field work in Panama and the Amazon region of Brazil. Up to that point, trichomycete collections had been made almost entirely from Europe and North America and Lichtwardt was motivated to discover more about the diversity and biogeography of trichomycetes in the tropics.

In 1955 he obtained a post-doctoral position at the University of Iowa that was offered for three years, but after two years he left to accept a position as an assistant professor at the University of Kansas where he spent the remainder of his career. He rose quickly to associate professor in 1960 and then professor in 1965. He twice served as chairman of the Department of Botany: 1971–74 and 1981–84. He officially retired at the end of 1995 and has served as professor emeritus since that time.

At Kansas, he taught botany, mycology, plant pathology, and medical mycology. He mentored 16 Ph.D. students and 12 Master's students. He has published over 150 papers, contributed to several book chapters, and written a monograph of the trichomycetes that was published online in 2001; it includes an interactive key for identifying species that is now curated by D.B. Strongman at Saint Mary's University, Halifax, Nova Scotia, Canada. His research is broadly involved with the evolution, ecology, biogeography, and diversity of trichomycetes. He pioneered studies in the tropics, expanded work on marine taxa, and collaborated internationally with various mycologists.

== Research ==
Lichtwardt's (author abbreviation Lichtw.) work led to over 100 taxon descriptions, including validation (along with one of his French collaborators, Manier) of the order Harpellales that circumscribes nearly all species of trichomycetes. Some examples are:

Arundinula abyssicola] Van Dover & Lichtwardt, 1986.: This protist species was collected from the guts of squat lobsters living around deep sea hydrothermal vents (~2,600 m depth) at the Galapagos Rift and East Pacific Rise. This is one of only two deep water collections of trichomycetes

Austrosmittium Lichtwardt & Williams, 1990 : This fungal genus was originally described from South Island, New Zealand, and all other species have so far been collected only from the Southern Hemisphere.

Trichozygospora chironomidarum Lichtwardt, 1972: This species has been collected from hosts in cold, mountainous streams in the Grand Teton National Park, Wyoming, the Abiskojåkka river some 125 miles north of the Arctic Circle in Sweden, and a stream draining from the Steingletscher glacier in Switzerland.

From collections in various geographic locations, Lichtwardt proposed two main hypotheses regarding historical trichomycete distributions: First, that “ancestral trichomycetes began to adapt to arthropod gut habitation shortly after insects began to evolve in aquatic habitats some 250 to 190 million years BP.” Second, that trichomycetes were associated with their arthropod hosts prior to the breakup of Pangea, thus accounting for the cosmopolitan distribution of some species and genera.

In addition to taxonomy, he contributed to the methodologies important for the study of trichomycetes. He grew over 150 trichomycete isolates in axenic culture, a critical step for experimental studies on nutritional modes and mating types as well as molecular and ultrastructural analyses.

== Professional societies ==
- Mycological Society of America (Honorary Life Member) (President of the Society, 1971 72; Editor-in-Chief of MYCOLOGIA, 1965–70; Councilor, 1963–65)
- Botanical Society of America (chairman, Microbiological Section, 1975–76)
- British Mycological Society (Centennial Fellow)
- Japan Mycological Society (Honorary Member)
- American Institute of Biological Sciences
- Federation of American Scientists
- Union of Concerned Scientists
- Society of Sigma Xi
- American Association of University Professors
- Kansas Academy of Science (Managing Editor, Transactions of the Kansas Academy of Science, 1958–65; Council Member, 1973–74)
- North American Mycological Association

== Awards and honors ==
- National Science Foundation Senior Postdoctoral Fellowship, 1963 1964 (Research in Japan and Hawaii)
- Honorary Life Membership, Mycological Society of America, beginning 1973
- William H. Weston Award for Teaching Excellence in Mycology, Mycological Society of America, 1982
- Distinguished Mycologist Award for 1991, Mycological Society of America
- Honorary Member, Mycological Society of Japan, 1995
- Centennial Fellow, British Mycological Society, 1996
- Robert W. Lichtwardt Student Research Award, Mycological Society of America, established by Merlin and Paula White, 2015

== Selected publications ==
Lichtwardt, R. W. 1954. Morphological, cytological, and taxonomic observations on species of Enterobryus from the hindgut of certain millipedes and beetles. Ph.D. Dissertation, University of Illinois 241 pp.

Horn, B. W., and Lichtwardt, R. W. 1981. Studies on the nutritional relationship of larval Aedes aegypti (Diptera: Culicidae) with Smittium culisetae (Trichomycetes). Mycologia 73: 724–740.

Lichtwardt, R. W. 1986. The Trichomycetes: Fungal Associates of Arthropods. Springer-Verlag, New York. 343 pp.

Lichtwardt, R. W., and Williams, M. C. 1988. Discovery of sexual reproduction in an unusual new species of Stachylina (Trichomycetes). Mycologia 80: 400–405.

Lichtwardt, R. W., and Williams, M. C. 1990. Trichomycete gut fungi in Australian aquatic larvae. Canadian Journal of Botany 68: 1057–1074.

Lichtwardt, R. W. 1996. Trichomycetes and the arthropod gut. In: The Mycota, Animal and Human Relations. D. Howard, and D. Miller, eds. Springer-Verlag, New York. pp. 315–330.

Lichtwardt, R. W. 2000. Gut fungi of invertebrates, p. 83–85. In: Monteverde: ecology and conservation of a tropical cloud forest. Nadkarni, N.M., and Wheelwright, N.T., eds. Oxford University Press, New York. 573 p.

Lichtwardt, R.W. 2002. Trichomycetes: fungi in relationship with insects and other arthropods, pp. 575–588. In: Symbiosis: mechanisms and model systems. J. Seckbach, ed. Kluwer Academic Publishers, Dordrecht, The Netherlands.

Lichtwardt, R.W. 2012. Evolution of Trichomycetes. Chapter 5, p. 107–114. In: Systematics and evolution of fungi. J.K. Misra, J.P. Tewari, S.K. Deshmukh, eds. 412 p.

Lichtwardt. R.W. 2012. Trichomycete gut fungi from tropical regions of the world. Biodiversity and Conservation 21: 2397–2402.
