= Elizabeth Arnold (scientist) =

American evolutionary biologist

- Born: Anne Elizabeth Arnold
- Education: Duke University; University of Arizona
- Scientific career
- Workplaces: University of Arizona; Duke University
- Thesis: Neotropical fungal endophytes: Diversity and ecology (2002)
- Website: Arnold Lab

A. Elizabeth "Betsy" Arnold is an American evolutionary biologist who started as a professor of Plant Sciences and Ecology/Evolutionary Biology at the University of Arizona in 2005. She is also a curator of the Robert L. Gilbertson Mycological Herbarium at the University of Arizona. She researches fungal biology, specifically fungal endophytes, which are fungi that live in plants. She was elected fellow of the American Association for the Advancement of Science in 2021, which is the major scientific organization that publishes the journal Science.

In addition to her research, Arnold has served as an executive editor of Mycologia,Associate Editor of the American Journal of Botany, Subject Editor for Biotropicaand has helped lead the Robert L. Gilbertson Mycological Herbarium, supporting the expansion, preservation, and management of its fungal collections.

== Early life and education ==
In 1995, Arnold studied biology at Duke University. Her undergraduate thesis was a study of flower color polymorphism. Her doctorate was at the University of Arizona, where she investigated fungal ecology, evolution, systematics and endophytes under the guidance of American botanist Lucinda A. McDade. During her doctoral studies at the University of Arizona, Arnold was a National Science Foundation Graduate Fellow, Arnold then returned to Duke, where she was awarded a National Science Foundation postdoctoral fellowship to work alongside François Lutzoni. After graduating from Duke, she spent a year working in Panama to continue her research. In Panama, her work was focused on the significance of tropical endophytes in tropical trees. Her research interests include community ecology, evolutionary ecology, mycology, tropical biology, and microbial ecology. In Panama, she worked at the Smithsonian Tropical Research Institute. In which her work is currently funded from today. In 2018, Arnold Obtained the University of Arizona Collage of Agriculture and Life Sciences Shirley O'Brien award for Diversity and Inclusion. Her work has helped frame endophyte communities as ecological "keystone" players, influencing how scientists think about biodiversity in tropical forests, arctic, tundra, and deserts.

Her tropical-forest research after Duke helped lead into the subject of her Ph.D. research.

== Research and career ==
In 2005, Arnold was appointed to the faculty at the University of Arizona. Arnold taught fungal biology to student ranging from postdocs, graduate students, undergraduates, K-12 teachers and high school students. In 2015, she started as a curator at the Robert L. Gilbertson Mycological Herbarium, later getting promoted to professor. Currently, she is a professor and the Interim School Director for the School of Plant Sciences and the Department of Ecology and Evolutionary Biology at the University of Arizona. She continues to research fungal endophytes, the very small fungi that live within plants without causing disease, uncovering both the remarkable diversity of endophytes and their potential applications in biotechnology. According to her 2007 study in Ecology, which examines the diversity and ecological functions of fungal endophytes in tropical ecosystems, these fungi are extremely varied and essential to plant resilience and health, especially in tropical leaves, which are hotspots for biodiversity. Her research has helped improve knowledge about plant and fungi interact actions in tropical settings. Arnold has studied these endophytes in trees, crop plants and shrubs in tropical rainforests and the arctic tundra. She has also studied hot desert. In winter 2021, Arnold was elected fellow of the American Association for the Advancement of Science.

Arnold's research addresses fungal ecology, evolution, and systematics, with a particular focus on the diversity and ecological roles of fungal endophytes in plant communities. Arnold has been executive editor of Mycologia, and served on various MSA committees and published over 120 peer-reviewed papers such as "Uinta county, its place in history". She has maintained and developed the Gilbertson Mycologia Herbarium. Her editorial roles include Executive Editor of Mycologia, Co-editor for the Coevolution section in Frontiers in Ecology and Evolution, Associate Editor for the American Journal of Botany, and Subject Editor for Biotropica.

Arnold's research has also shown that fungal endophytes can help protect plants by limiting damages caused by pathogens in tropical trees, and that there may be diversities amongst endophytes resulting in different interactions with different hosts.

In a 2003 study, Arnold and her colleagues found that cacao tree leaves pre-colonized with endophytic fungi were damaged less from a plant pathogen than leaves without it, showing that these fungi can protect their host plants.

In 2021, Arnold was elected a Fellow of the American Association for the Advancement of Science (AAAS) for her contributions to evolutionary biology and fungal ecology. Arnold has also been a recipient of the International Mycological Association's Arthur Henry Buller Medal (2011).

She worked alongside François Lutzoni on the molecular ecology and evolution of endophytes in temperate and boreal biomes at Duke University.

In addition to her work in tropical forests and arctic environments, Arnold has conducted long-term research on fungal endophytes across the boreal forests of eastern North America, showing that these fungi are highly diverse, locally adapted to specific environmental conditions, and sensitive to climate change.

From 2022 to 2023, Arnold served as the president of the MSA.

In 2025, Arnold coauthored a study examining the genomes of fungi found in wild lettuce plants collected in Arizona, contributing to research on the genetic diversity of plant-associated fungi.

== Awards and honors ==
- 2002 Alwyn Gentry Award
- 2011 International Mycological Association Arthur Henry Buller Medal
- 2011 David E. Cox Teaching Award
- 2012 Mycological Society of America Alexopolous Prize
- 2013 Staff Award for Excellence
- 2013 1885 Distinguished Scholar, The University of Arizona
- 2014 Outstanding Seminar Speaker, Rancho Santa Ana Botanic Garden Graduate Student Association
- 2016 Mycological Society of America William H. Weston Award
- 2016 University of Arizona Bart Cardon Fellow
- 2017 Warren Herb Wagner Lecturer in Plant Evolution, University of Michigan
- 2018 Shirley O’Brien Award for Diversity and Inclusion, University of Arizona
- 2021 Elected Fellow of the American Association for the Advancement of Science

2021 Fellow of the Mycological Society of America

== Selected publications ==
- Arnold, A. Elizabeth; Harrington, Alison H.; Huang, Yu-Ling; u'Ren, Jana M.; Massimo, Nicholas C.; Knight-Connoni, Victoria; Inderbitzin, Patrik (2021). "Coniochaeta elegans sp. nov., Coniochaeta montana sp. nov. And Coniochaeta nivea sp. nov., three new species of endophytes with distinctive morphology and functional traits". International Journal of Systematic and Evolutionary Microbiology. 71 (11). doi:10.1099/ijsem.0.005003. PMID 34731078.
- Rodriguez, Russell J.; White, James Francis; Arnold, A. Elizabeth; Redman, Regina (2009). "Fungal endophytes: diversity and functional roles". New Phytologist. 182 (2): 314–330. doi:10.1111/j.1469-8137.2009.02773.x. PMID 19236579. Wikidata Q33411532.
- James, Timothy Y.; Kauff, Frank; Schoch, Conrad L.; et al. (2006). "Reconstructing the early evolution of Fungi using a six-gene phylogeny". Nature. 443 (7113): 818–822. doi:10.1038/nature05110. PMID 17051209. Wikidata Q21972837.
- Arnold, A Elizabeth; Mejía, Luis Carlos; Kyllo, Damond; Rojas, Enith I; Maynard, Zuleyka; Robbins, Nancy; Herre, Edward Allen (2003). "Fungal endophytes limit pathogen damage in a tropical tree". Proceedings of the National Academy of Sciences of the United States of America. 100 (26): 15649–54. Bibcode:2003PNAS..10015649A. doi:10.1073/pnas.2533483100. PMC 307622. PMID 14671327. Wikidata Q24617213.
- Del Olmo-Ruiz, Mariana; Arnold, A. Elizabeth (2017). "Community structure of fern-affiliated endophytes in three neotropical forests". Journal of Tropical Ecology. 33 (1): 60–73. doi:10.1017/S0266467416000535. JSTOR 26563657.

Shaffer, J.P., J.M. U’Ren, D.A. Baltrus, R.E. Gallery, A.E. Arnold. 2017. An endohyphal bacterium (Chitinophaga, Bacteroidetes) influences carbon source use by Fusarium keratoplasticum (F. solani species complex, Nectriaceae). Frontiers in Microbiology 8: e350.
