= Leland Shanor =

American mycologist and botanist (1914–1993)

- Born: July 21, 1914; Butler, Pennsylvania
- Died: March 31, 1993 (aged 78)
- Resting place: Rockfish Presbyterian Church Cemetery, Wallace, Duplin County, North Carolina
- Education: University of North Carolina
- Spouse: Mary Williams Ward Shanor
- Scientific career
- Academic advisors: Williams Chambers Coker, John Nathaniel Couch

Leland Shanor (July 21, 1914 – March 31, 1993) was an American mycologist and botanist. He married mycologist Mary Williams Ward Shanor on June 20, 1940, in Burgaw, North Carolina. They had two sons. Charles was born in 1946 and Paul in 1949. Outside of their studies in mycology, Leland and Mary Shanor were both heavily involved in real estate. They are both buried in Rockfish Presbyterian Church Cemetery in Wallace, Duplin County, North Carolina.

== Education ==
Leland Shanor was born in Butler, Pennsylvania, where he received his early education. He obtained his A.B. degree in 1935 from Maryville College, Tennessee. He then enrolled in the University of North Carolina, Chapel Hill, where he received his M.A. degree in 1937 and PhD in 1939. His advisors were William Chambers Coker and John Nathaniel Couch. Under their guidance, Shanor developed a decided taste for mycology, notably on aquatic environment oomycetes.

== Academic career ==
After graduation, Shanor left the University of North Carolina to become instructor of botany at Clemson College in South Carolina for a one-year period and then later at the University of Illinois. Prior to World War II he worked on diverse groups, from chytrids to the early-diverging group Rozella. He described new species such as Nowakoskiella hemisphaerospora and the water mold Protoachlya hypogyna. During World War II Leland Shanor served as Plant Pathologist and led studies on fungi associated with tropical deterioration of textiles and cordage. After World War II, he went back to the University of Illinois in 1946 as an assistant professor. In 1951 he became professor and curator of the mycological collections. His work focused on various groups of Fungi, such as Laboulbeniales, a group of parasites attached to the exoskeletons of insects.

Shanor's fungal herbarium specimens are mainly held at the University of North Carolina (NCU), the University of Illinois (ILL) and in the United States National Fungus Collection (BPI). Other specimens can also be found at Harvard University's Farlow Herbarium (FH), Iowa State University's Ada Hayden Herbarium (ISC), the New York Botanical Garden (NY), the Oregon State University Herbarium (OSC), the herbarium at the University of California Berkeley (UC), the University of Florida Herbarium (FLAS), and the University of Michigan Herbarium (MICH).

Leland Shanor was appreciated as a professor and supervised several graduate students while at the University of Illinois. Many of his students became world authorities on the taxonomic groups that they studied. A few examples are Richard K. Benjamin who worked on Laboulbeniales, Everett Smith Beneke who studied human mycosis and Robert W. Lichtwardt who is a world authority on Trichomycetes.

In 1956, Shanor left the University of Illinois to join Florida State University in Tallahassee as professor of botany and chairman of biological sciences. This departure marks a change in Leland Sharon's career towards more administrative responsibilities. He became dean of the division of advanced studies in the Florida Institute of Continuing Studies and division director of NSF's division of undergraduate studies.

Leland Shanor's last job was at the University of Florida. In 1965 he became a professor of botany and was the chairman of the botany department. He occupied diverse administrative positions but was still supervising graduate students. He served also in numerous university committees.

== Formal positions ==
- 1950–1953: Editor of the Mycological Society Newsletter
- 1954: President of the Mycological Society of America
- 1955: President of the Illinois Academy of Sciences
- 1958–1959: Director of the National Science Foundation Summer Institute for Highschool Teachers
- 1959–1962: Director National Science Foundation's Research Participation Program
- 1961–1971: Chairman of the Editorial Committee of Mycologia Memoirs
- 1972: President of the Southeastern Biologists

== Honors ==
- 1940: Elected as a Fellow in the American Association for Advancement of Science
- 1951–1952: Guggenheim Memorial Foundation Fellowship
- 1961: Honorary D.Sc. degree from Illinois Wesleyan University
- 1964: Citation of merit from Highlands Biological Station

Two species and a genus of fungi belonging to the Pezizomycotina subdivision were named after Leland Shanor: Densocarpa shanorii, Laboulbenia shanorii and the genus Shanorella.
