= Xeromphalina fraxinophila =

Scientific classification
- Domain: Eukaryota
- Kingdom: Fungi
- Division: Basidiomycota
- Class: Agaricomycetes
- Order: Agaricales
- Family: Mycenaceae
- Genus: Xeromphalina
- Species: X. fraxinophila

Binomial name
- Xeromphalina fraxinophila A.H. Sm.

Species of fungus

Xeromphalina fraxinophila is a species of fungus in the family Mycenaceae. It is a plant pathogen.
