= Wilhelm Solheim (botanist) =

American botanist (1898–1978)

Wilhelm G. Solheim I
- Born: 1898
- Died: 1978 (aged 79–80)
- Occupation: Botanist

Wilhelm G. Solheim I (1898–1978) was a botanist after whom the Wilhelm G. Solheim Mycological Herbarium at the University of Wyoming is named. He issued the exsiccata series Mycoflora Saximontanensis exsiccata (1934–1957), several fascicles (cent.) with George Baker Cummins. His son, Wilhelm G. Solheim II was an archeologist and a senior practitioner of archaeology in Southeast Asia.

== Sources ==
- Baxter, John W.; Martha Christensen (Jan–Feb 1979). "Wilhelm Gerhard Solheim (1898-1978)". Mycologia. 71 (1). Mycological Society of America: 45–46. JSTOR 3759219.
