= Xeromphalina junipericola =

Scientific classification
- Kingdom: Fungi
- Division: Basidiomycota
- Class: Agaricomycetes
- Order: Agaricales
- Family: Mycenaceae
- Genus: Xeromphalina
- Species: X. junipericola

Binomial name
- Xeromphalina junipericola G.Moreno & Heykoop (1996)

Species of mushroom-forming fungus

Xeromphalina junipericola is a species of agaric fungus in the family Mycenaceae, first described by Gabriel Moreno and Michel Heykoop in 1996. This small mushroom-forming fungus features a distinctive brown-reddish cap with purplish to violaceous tinges, covered with yellowish-orange woolly tufts, and grows exclusively on juniper stumps. Initially considered endemic to Spain, where it was discovered growing on Juniperus thurifera, its known distribution has since expanded to Turkey and North Macedonia where it occurs on different juniper species. Despite these additional findings, X. junipericola remains a rare species with a relatively restricted distribution that follows that of scale-leaf juniper trees in southeastern Europe.

== Taxonomy ==
Xeromphalina junipericola was first described scientifically by Gabriel Moreno and Michel Heykoop in 1996 in the journal Zeitschrift für Mykologie. The specific epithet junipericola refers to its habitat, meaning "juniper-dwelling" or "living on juniper" (from Juniperus and Latin -cola, "dweller"). The holotype specimen (AH 17049) was collected on 16 November 1994, by M. Heykoop and G. Moreno from trunks of Juniperus thurifera near Ermita de los Enebrales, Tamajón, in the province of Guadalajara, Spain.

The genus Xeromphalina was established by the mycologists Robert Kühner and René Maire Species in this genus are characterized by their velutinous (velvety) stipes covered with caulocystidia, amyloid spores, and their typically caespitose (growing in clusters) and lignicolous (growing on wood) habit. X. junipericola is distinguished from other Xeromphalina species by its purplish to violaceous coloration, the ochraceous-orange floccose hairs on its pileus and stipe, and its small amyloid spores. X. orickiana is the only other species in the genus with similar purplish to violaceous coloration, but it has longer spores and is found on redwood logs in California, USA.

== Description ==
Xeromphalina junipericola is a small mushroom-forming fungus in the family Mycenaceae. Its cap (pileus) is 2–6 mm in diameter, initially globose but becoming cyathiform (cup-shaped) at maturity. It displays distinctive brown-reddish colouration with purplish to violaceous tinges. The cap surface is covered with yellowish-orange floccose hairs (small woolly tufts), which are more abundant in young specimens. The gills are decurrent (running down the stipe), narrow, and grey to grey-violaceous in colour. They have scarce lamellulae (short gills that do not reach the stipe) which occasionally anastomose (connect with each other).

The stipe is cylindrical, measuring 6–14 mm long and 0.5–1.5 mm thick, and is coloured similarly to the cap, though sometimes paler. It is covered with a whitish powdery "bloom" and has a distinctly fluffy (floccose) base formed by ochraceous-orange hyphae.

Microscopically, X. junipericola has small, ellipsoid spores measuring 3–4 × 2–2.5 μm, which are hyaline (transparent), smooth and amyloid. The basidia (spore-producing structures) are clavate (club-shaped) and four-spored, measuring 18–25 × 3–5 μm. The cheilocystidia (cystidia on the gill edges) measure 30–40 × 5–8 μm, creating a sterile gill edge, and are variable in shape but frequently fusiform with a cylindrical neck that is sometimes very long and narrow. The caulocystidia (cystidia on the stipe) are also variable in shape (cylindrical, lageniform to fusiform) and measure 35–60 × 8–10 μm.

The cap cuticle (pileipellis) consists of cylindrical hyphae with encrusting pigment forming bands and brown-yellowish thread-like structures that are variable in shape and size, appearing flexuous, tortuous, club-shaped (clavate), cylindrical or diverticulate. Clamp connections are present in the hyphae. When treated with chemical reagents, the hyphae of the pileipellis turn purple-vinaceous in 10% ammonium hydroxide (NH_{4}OH), while the pileitrama shows a purplish-reddish colour in 10% potassium hydroxide (KOH) solution and appears brown in water. This mushroom has no distinctive taste or smell.

== Habitat and distribution ==
Xeromphalina junipericola is a saprobic species that grows exclusively on stumps of juniper trees. It was first discovered in the Guadalajara province of Spain, where it grows on Juniperus thurifera in extensive native juniper forests that remain in good ecological condition. These juniper forests are of great interest from both botanical and mycological perspectives, with many of the fungal species found there characterised by an Iberian-North African distribution pattern.

The species was initially considered endemic to Spain, but its known distribution has since expanded to southeastern Europe. In 2009, Dogan and Karadelev reported finding X. junipericola in several localities in Turkey and Macedonia (now North Macedonia), significantly extending its known range. In Turkey, specimens were collected from four different localities in the southern and central parts of the country, growing on stumps of different juniper species including Juniperus excelsa and J. foetidissima at elevations ranging from 900 to 1,644 metres. In Macedonia, it was found growing on a Juniperus excelsa stump in a pure juniper forest at an altitude of about 300 metres.

The distribution of X. junipericola follows that of scale-leaf juniper trees in Europe, specifically Juniperus excelsa, J. foetidissima, and J. thurifera. The fungus has been collected during both spring (April to May) and autumn (October to December) seasons. Despite these additional findings, X. junipericola remains a rare species with a relatively restricted distribution, currently documented only in Spain, Turkey, and Macedonia.
