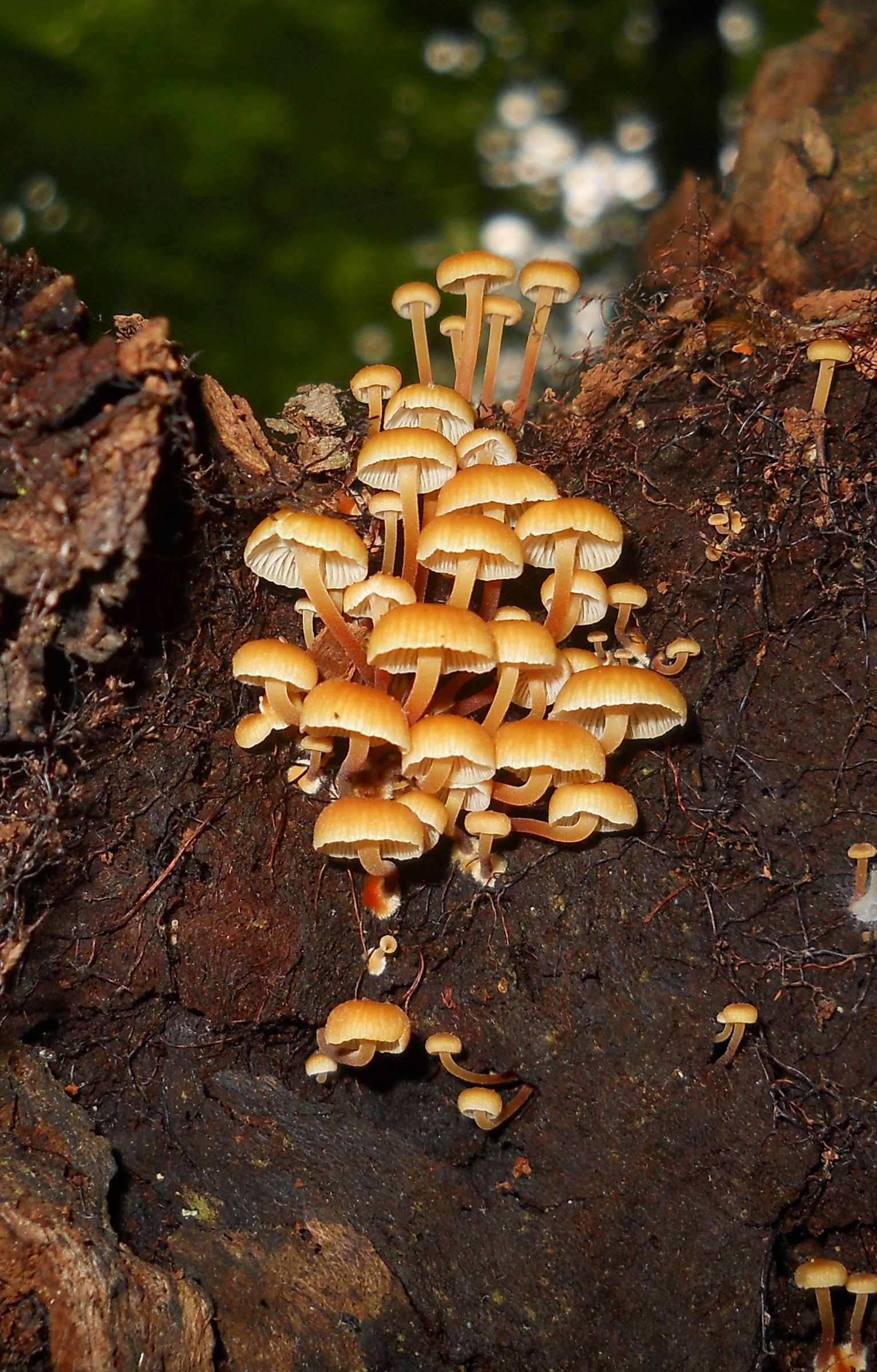

Scientific classification
- Kingdom: Fungi
- Division: Basidiomycota
- Class: Agaricomycetes
- Order: Agaricales
- Family: Mycenaceae
- Genus: Xeromphalina
- Species: X. kauffmanii

Binomial name
- Xeromphalina kauffmanii A.H.Sm. (1953)

= Xeromphalina kauffmanii =

Species of fungus

Xeromphalina kauffmanii is a species of agaric fungus belonging to the Mycenaceae family. Found in North America, Costa Rica, and Japan, it was described as new to science in 1953. The type collection was made in Chelsea, Michigan, in June 1940. The specific epithet kauffmanii honors American mycologist Calvin Henry Kauffman.

== Description ==
The cap of the fruit body is convex, sometimes with a central depression at maturity, and measures 4–15 mm (0.16–0.59 in). Its color is initially bright rusty orange, changing to bright orange to cinnamon in maturity. The narrow, light yellow to cream gills. The reddish stipe measures 1.7–3 cm (0.7–1.2 in) by 0.8–2 mm wide. It has yellowish fibrils surrounding its base, as well as white rhizomorphs attaching the base to the substrate. The mushroom has thin, cream-colored flesh with an indistinct odor and a taste that is initially mild before becoming slightly bitter.

The spore print is white. Spores are elliptical, thin-walled, and amyloid, measuring 4.2–6 by 2.5–3.5 μm. The basidia (spore-bearing cells) are club-shaped, four-spored, and measure 21–25 by 4–5 μm.

=== Similar species ===
Xeromphalina campanella is a lookalike species that grows on rotting conifer wood.

== Habitat and distribution ==
Xeromphalina kauffmanii fruits in dense groups or clusters on rotting hardwood logs and stumps. Fruiting occurs from summer to autumn in eastern North America. The fungus has also been recorded from Costa Rica and Japan.
