= John W. Taylor (professor) =

American scientist (born 1950)

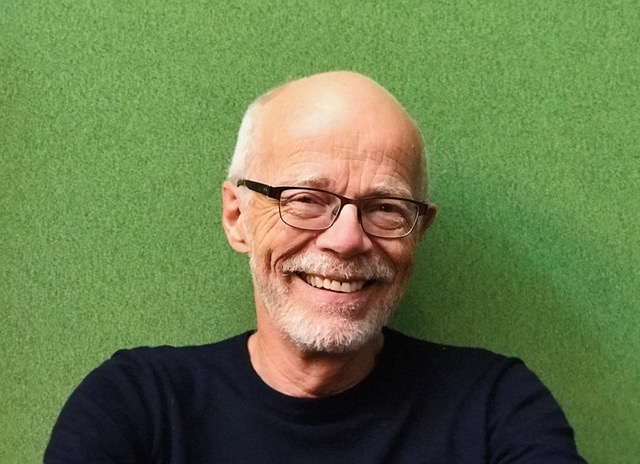
- Born: 1950 (age 75–76); Colorado Springs, Colorado, United States
- Occupations: Mycologist, evolutionary biologist, ecologist

Academic background
- Education: University of California, Berkeley University of California, Davis University of Georgia
- Doctoral advisor: Kenneth Wells
- Other advisor: Melvin Fuller

Academic work
- Discipline: Mycology
- Sub-discipline: Evolution, Ecology
- Institutions: University of California, Berkeley

John Waldo Taylor is an American scientist who researches fungal evolution and ecology. He is professor of the graduate school in the Department of Plant and Microbial Biology at the University of California, Berkeley.

== Education ==
John W. Taylor grew up in Los Angeles, California, and graduated from University High School in 1968. He completed an AB in Ecology at the University of California, Berkeley in 1972. There, he began his research career with a senior thesis on mycorrhizal plants under the supervision of the mycologist, Professor Ralph Emerson. He entered a combined master's and doctorate program in botany at the University of California, Davis, in 1972. There, he use electron microscopy to study nuclear division in the basidiomycete yeast, Bullera alba, under the supervision of the mycologist, Professor Kenneth Wells. In 1978 he began postdoctoral studies at the University of Georgia under the supervision of Professor Melvin Fuller. There, he studied the ultrastructure of zoospore development in the chytridiomycete fungus, Chytriomyces hyalinus. While at Georgia, he engaged in discussions about molecular evolution with researchers in the genetics department where his wife, Delia Barnes Taylor, worked on DNA transformation of plants. In 1980, Taylor accepted an assistant professorship in what is now the department of microbial biology at the University of California, Berkeley. In his first few years at Berkeley, he completed ultrastructural research begun in Georgia while shifting his focus to molecular evolution of fungi, beginning with the model filamentous fungus, Neurospora.

== Career ==
Taylor has been a professor in plant and microbial biology at the University of California, Berkeley, since 1980. He was a Miller Research Professor in 1999. He was chair of the graduate group in microbiology and associate chair of the department of plant and microbial biology at UC Berkeley 2003 to 2009. He was a founding co-director of the computational genomics resource laboratory at UC Berkeley (2011-2017).

Taylor was elected president of the Mycological Society of America for 2002-2003 and president of the International Mycological Association from 2010 to 2014. He serves or has served on the editorial boards of mBIO, Mycologia, Mycological Research, Fungal Genetics and Biology, and IMA Fungus.

Taylor was chair of the program committee for the Mycological Society of American Annual Meeting (1990), chair of the program committee for the International Union of Microbiological Societies Mycological Congress (2005), co-chair, Gordon Research Conference on Cellular and Molecular Fungal Biology (2006-2008), and co-chair, Mycological Society of America Annual Meeting (2016). He served the Centraalbureau voor Schimmelcultures (now, Westerdijk Fungal Biodiversity Institute) on their scientific advisory board (2000-2010) and has served the Canadian Institute for Advanced Research on their scientific boards on integrated microbial diversity (2010-2018) and Fungal Kingdom: Threats and Opportunities (2019-2024).

=== Research ===
In 1990, Taylor's lab group published protocols for fungal PCR that were developed in Berkeley by a team including sabbatical visitor, Dr. Thomas J. White (who had directed the development of PCR - polymerase chain reaction - at CETUS corporation), postdoc Thomas D. Bruns and student Steven B. Lee. Their approach has been very influential in fungal evolution and ecology [ ]. Taylor and White continued their collaboration by focusing on the evolution of two human pathogenic fungi, Coccidioides immitis and Histoplasma capsulatum. Taylor and colleagues also applied PCR to fungal phylogeny and fitting phylogeny to geologic time. As DNA sequencing costs dropped, they used population genetics to recognize fungal species and describe them, based solely on DNA variation. Their approach for phylogenetic recognition of fungal species has become the standard for mycology. Their work on species recognition led them to show that fungi have evolved reinforced barriers to mating, in this case the first evidence for female mate choice in a microbe. DNA sequence data were then used to detect recombination in fungi for which sex had never been observed, despite years of inquiry. The combination of nucleic acid phylogeny and detection of reproductive mode brought an end to the centuries-old practice of classifying fungi for which sex had been observed apart from those where the morphology of sex remained obscure. Taylor's lab then turned to phylogenomics to find that human pathogenic fungi had evolved away from consuming plant cell walls toward consuming animal protein, suggesting that small mammals constitute a reservoir for some fungal diseases. Their next research featured the use of population genomics to identify genes under selection, followed by use of the gene's function to form hypotheses for environmental features driving adaptation, and capped by testing the hypotheses by gene deletion - an approach they termed "reverse ecology". Having characterized populations by genomics, they collaborated with Professors Louise Glass and Rachel B. Brem at UC Berkeley in genome wide association studies of fungal signaling. In the past decade, Taylor, in collaborations with Professor Tom Bruns and Dr. Peggy Lemaux of University of California, Berkeley, has used PCR identification of environmental samples to focus on fungal community ecology in indoor air, ectomycorrhizal forests, and the drought resistant crop plant, sorghum.

== Honors and distinctions ==
- Taylor received the Distinguished Teaching Award from the College of Natural Resources at UC Berkeley (2005) and the WH Weston Award for Teaching from the Mycological Society of America (1994).
- DeBary Medal from the International Mycological Association (2018), Von Arx Medal from the Westerdijk Fungal Biodiversity Institute (2012). Distinguished Mycologist from the Mycological Society of America (2018), Lucille K. Georg Medal, International Society for Human and Animal Mycology (2003), Rhoda Benham Medal, Medical Mycological Society of the Americas (2004), C. J. Alexopoulos Prize from the Mycological Society of America (1986), Taylor has been elected Fellow of: American Association for the Advancement of Science (2000), American Academy of Microbiology (1998), International Mycological Association (2018), Mycological Society of America (2005), and California Academy of Science (1993).
- Taylor was invited to deliver the Keynote presentation at the International Mycological Congress (2010) and the Perkins-Metzenberg Lecture at the Fungal Genetics Conference (2019).
- Two awards have been established in Taylor's honor: the Taylor-White Endowed Lecture at UC Berkeley (2011) and the John Taylor Graduate Student Research Award of the Mycological Society of America (2019).
