= Xeromphalina cirris =

Scientific classification
- Domain: Eukaryota
- Kingdom: Fungi
- Division: Basidiomycota
- Class: Agaricomycetes
- Order: Agaricales
- Family: Mycenaceae
- Genus: Xeromphalina
- Species: X. cirris

Binomial name
- Xeromphalina cirris Redhead (1988)

Species of fungus

Xeromphalina cirris is a species of agaric fungus in the family Mycenaceae. Described as new to science in 1988, it is known from montane or boreal coniferous forests floors in British Columbia, Ontario, Colorado, Idaho, New Mexico, Oregon, Utah, Washington, and Wyoming.
