= Elizabeth Arnold (singer) =

British singer

- Born: Yorkshire, England
- Occupation: Singer
- Known for: Work in Leeds Piano Competition and Opera North

Elizabeth Arnold is a retired classical singer and member of the artistic community in Yorkshire, England. Along with her husband, retired Leeds businessman Olav Arnold, she has made many generous financial contributions to a number of arts organisations in northern England and sits on several boards of trustees.

== Career ==
Arnold is listed as an Honorary Patron of the "Northern Aldborough Festival"; she and her husband are also significant contributors to Opera North. The founding of the Leeds Lieder Festival would not have been possible without her initial contribution.

She also worked for several decades as an administrator for the Leeds Piano Competition, one of the most prestigious piano competitions in the world, which was started in 1961 by Dame Fanny Waterman and the late Countess of Harewood. For many years she served as the supervisor of Tetley Hall, formerly the residence for competitors.

The 2006 competition was Arnold's last as controller; her duties were assumed at the 2009 competition by Telsa Woolman.
