= Mycologia =

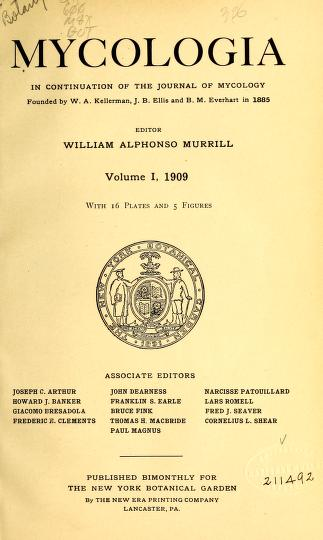
- Cover of the first issue
- Discipline: Mycology
- Language: English
- Edited by: Christopher L. Schardl

Publication details
- History: 1909–present Merger of Journal of Mycology (1885–1908) Mycological Bulletin (1903–1908)
- Publisher: Taylor & Francis for the Mycological Society of America (United States)
- Frequency: Bimonthly
- Impact factor: 2.958 (2021)

Standard abbreviations
- ISO 4: Mycologia

Indexing
- CODEN: MYCOAE
- ISSN: 0027-5514 (print); 1557-2536 (web)
- LCCN: 57051730
- JSTOR: 00275514
- OCLC no.: 1640733

Links
- Journal homepage; Mycologia at Taylor & Francis Online

Mycologia is a peer-reviewed scientific journal that publishes papers on all aspects of the fungi, including lichens. It first appeared as a bimonthly journal in January 1909, published by the New York Botanical Garden under the editorship of William Murrill. It became the official journal of the Mycological Society of America, which still publishes it today. It was formed as a merger of the Journal of Mycology (14 volumes; 1885–1908) and the Mycological Bulletin (7 volumes; 1903–1908). The Mycological Bulletin was known as the Ohio Mycological Bulletin in its first volume.

== Editors ==
The following persons have been editor-in-chief of the journal:

- 1909–1924 - William Murrill
- 1924–1932 - Fred J. Seaver
- 1933 - H.M. Fitzpatrick
- 1933–1934 - J.A. Stevenson
- 1934–1935 - F.A. Wolf
- 1935–1936 - G.R. Bisby
- 1945–1950 - Alexander H. Smith
- 1951–1957 - G.W. Martin
- 1958–1960 - Donald P. Rogers
- 1960–1965 - Clark T. Rogerson
- 1966–1970 - R.W. Lichtward
- 1967 - Joseph C. Gilman
- 1971–1975 - R.K. Benjamin
- 1976–1980 - M. Barr Bigelow
- 1981–1985 - T.W. Johnson, Jr.
- 1986–1990 - R.H. Petersen
- 1991–1995 - David McLaughlin
- 1996–2000 - David H. Griffin
- 2001–2004 - Joan W. Bennett
- 2004–2009 - Don Natvig
- 2009–2014 - Jeffrey K. Stone
- 2015–present - See below

The following persons have been executive editors of the journal:

- 2014-2020 - Christopher L. Schardl
- 2014-2019 - Keith A. Seifert
- 2014-2016 - Lee Taylor
- 2014-2018 - Frances Trail
- 2016-2021 - A. Elizabeth (Betsy) Arnold
- 2018–2022 - P. Brandon Matheny
- 2019–2023 - Priscila Chaverri
- 2020–2022 - Rosa R. Mouriño-Pérez
- 2022–present - Anthony Amend
- 2022–present - Michael Freitag
- 2022–present - Terry W. Henkel
- 2023–present - Marin T. Brewer

The following persons have been managing editor of the journal:

- 2016-2020 - Brian D. Shaw
- 2021-present - Christopher L. Schardl

== Abstracting and indexing ==
Mycologia is abstracted and indexing in the following databases:

- Academic Search Premier
- AGRICOLA
- Biosis
- EMBASE
- GEOBASE
- MEDLINE
- Science Citation Index
- Scopus
