= Jeffrey Townsend =

American biostatistician and evolutionary biologist

Academic background
- Education: Brown University; Harvard University
- Academic advisors: Daniel Hartl; John W. Taylor

Jeffrey P. Townsend is an American biostatistician and evolutionary biologist. He is currently the Elihu Professor of Biostatistics and Professor of Ecology and Evolutionary Biology at the Yale School of Public Health at Yale University.

Townsend earned a Bachelor of Science in biology from Brown University in 1994. He completed his Ph.D. in organismic and evolutionary biology at Harvard University in 2002 under the direction of Daniel Hartl. After receiving his doctoral degree, Townsend was a Miller Research Fellow at the University of California, Berkeley, where he worked in the lab of John W. Taylor.

== Related links ==
- Jeffrey Townsend publications indexed by Google Scholar
