= Mycological Society of America =

Professional organization of mycologists

The Mycological Society of America (MSA) is a learned society that serves as the professional organization of mycologists in the U.S. and Canada. It was founded in 1932. The Society's constitution states that "The purpose of the Society is to promote and advance the science of mycology and to foster and encourage research and education in mycology in all its aspects." Members of the MSA meet annually to exchange information and build understanding of fungi.

== Publications ==
Mycologia is the official scholarly journal of the Mycological Society of America. Six issues are published each year; members receive a subscription as a benefit of membership. Both members and non-members are invited to submit scholarly manuscripts for publication. As of 2002, Mycologia issues are available to subscribers online as well as in print.

Inoculum is the Society's bimonthly newsletter. Though published in print through 2006, as of 2007 Inoculum is published online only and is freely accessible through the MSA website.

The Mycological Society of America also publishes Mycologia Memoirs, an occasional series of scholarly monographs on aspects of fungal biology.

== Membership ==
In 2006, MSA membership included about 1190 members drawn from 51 different countries. The society's constitution states that "Membership in the Society shall be open to persons or organizations who share the stated purposes of the Society." Members are eligible for many different annual awards that recognize scholarship, pedagogy, and research potential. The MSA may bestow honorary membership on particularly distinguished mycologists who reside outside North America.

=== Honorary members ===
- 1951, Ernst A Gäumann, Switzerland d.1963 – Mycologia 57:1-5, 1965
- 1955, Franz Petrak, Austria d.1973
- 1965, G.C. Ainsworth, United Kingdom d.1998 – Mycologia 91(4): 714, 1999; J.A. von Arx, Netherlands d.1988; C.T. Ingold, United Kingdom; Grace M. Waterhouse, United Kingdom d.1996
- 1966 Lilian E. Hawker, United Kingdom d.1991; J.A. Nannfeldt, Sweden d.1985 – Mycologia 78: 692-693, 1986
- 1973, M.B. Ellis, United Kingdom d.1996; Roger Heim, France d.1979 – Mycologia 72:1063-1064, 1980; Keisuke Tubaki, Japan
- 1983, R.W.G. Dennis, United Kingdom d.2003; R. Kühner, France d.1996 – Mycologia 91(4): 707, 1999; Emil Müller, Switzerland; C. V. Subramanian, India
- 1985, John Webster, United Kingdom
- 1987, Colin Booth, United Kingdom; Gastón Guzmán, Mexico; Meinhard Moser, Austria d.2002 - Inoculum 53(6):14. 2002.
- 1988, Leif Ryvarden, Norway
- 1989, Nils Fries, Sweden d.1994 – Inoculum 46(3): 3, 1995.
- 1992, E.J.H. Corner, United Kingdom d.1996 – Mycologia 90(4): 732, 1998; Vera Holubová-Jechová, Czech Republic d.1993 – Česká Mykologie 47(1): 83, 1993.
- 1993, Lennart Holm, Sweden; Erast Parmasto, Estonia; Josef Poelt, Austria d.1995 – Inoculum 46(3): 3, 1995; Jorge E. Wright, Argentina
- 1994, David L. Hawksworth, United Kingdom; Brian C. Sutton, United Kingdom; Joseph Wessels, Netherlands
- 1995, Karl Esser, Germany
- 1996, Junta Sugiyama, Japan; Anthony P.J. Trinci, United Kingdom
- 1997, Walter Gams, Netherlands
- 1998, Ludmila Marvanová, Czech Republic; Roy Watling, United Kingdom
- 2000, David J. Read, United Kingdom
- 2001, Birgitt Nordbring-Hertz, Sweden; John Pitt, Australia
- 2002, Ove E. Eriksson, Sweden
- 2003, Jeremy Burdon, Australia; Tsuguo Hongo, Japan; Egon Horak, Switzerland
- 2004, Rob Samson, The Netherlands
- 2005, Franz Oberwinkler, Germany
- 2006, Michael Wingfield, South Africa
- 2007, Jan Stenlid, Sweden
- 2008, Angela Restrepo, Colombia; Gioconda San-Blas, Venezuela

== Awards ==
MSA presents several awards to working mycologists and students in the field.

=== Distinguished Mycologist Award ===
The Distinguished Mycologist Award is given based on an outstanding mycological career, defined by published research and service to the field of mycology. The award was first presented in 1981. Notable recipients of the award include:

- 1981 - Kenneth B. Raper, Lindsay Shepherd Olive, George Baker Cummins, John Nathaniel Couch, Constantine John Alexopoulos
- 1982 - Alexander H. Smith, Chester Wilson Emmons, Libero Ajello
- 1984 - Charles Drechsler
- 1985 - Josiah Lincoln Lowe, Stanley Hughes
- 1986 - Rolf Singer, Mildred K. Nobles
- 1988 - Douglas Barton Osborne Savile
- 1990 - Harry D. Thiers
- 1991 - Robert W. Lichtwardt, Richard P. Korf
- 1992 - Margaret Elizabeth Barr-Bigelow
- 1994 - Robert Lee Gilbertson
- 1995 - Bryce Kendrick
- 1998 - Orson K. Miller Jr.
- 2000 - Ron Petersen
- 2002 - James Trappe
- 2003 - Meredith Blackwell
- 2005 - Walter Gams
- 2008 - John W. Taylor
- 2011 - Amy Y. Rossman
- 2017 - Roy Halling
- 2021 - Joseph Heitman
- 2022 - Joyce Longcore
- 2023 - Dennis E. Desjardin
- 2024 - David Hibbett

=== C. J. Alexopoulos Prize ===
The C. J. Alexopoulos Prize was named for Constantine John Alexopoulos, and is awarded to an outstanding mycologist early in their career. The first award was presented in 1978. Notable recipients of the award include:

- 1981 - Martha J. Powell
- 1983 - Meredith Blackwell
- 1986 - John W. Taylor
- 1998 - Dennis E. Desjardin
- 2000 - David Hibbett
- 2010 - Anne Pringle

== See also ==
- North American Mycological Association, MSA's sister society for amateur mycologists
