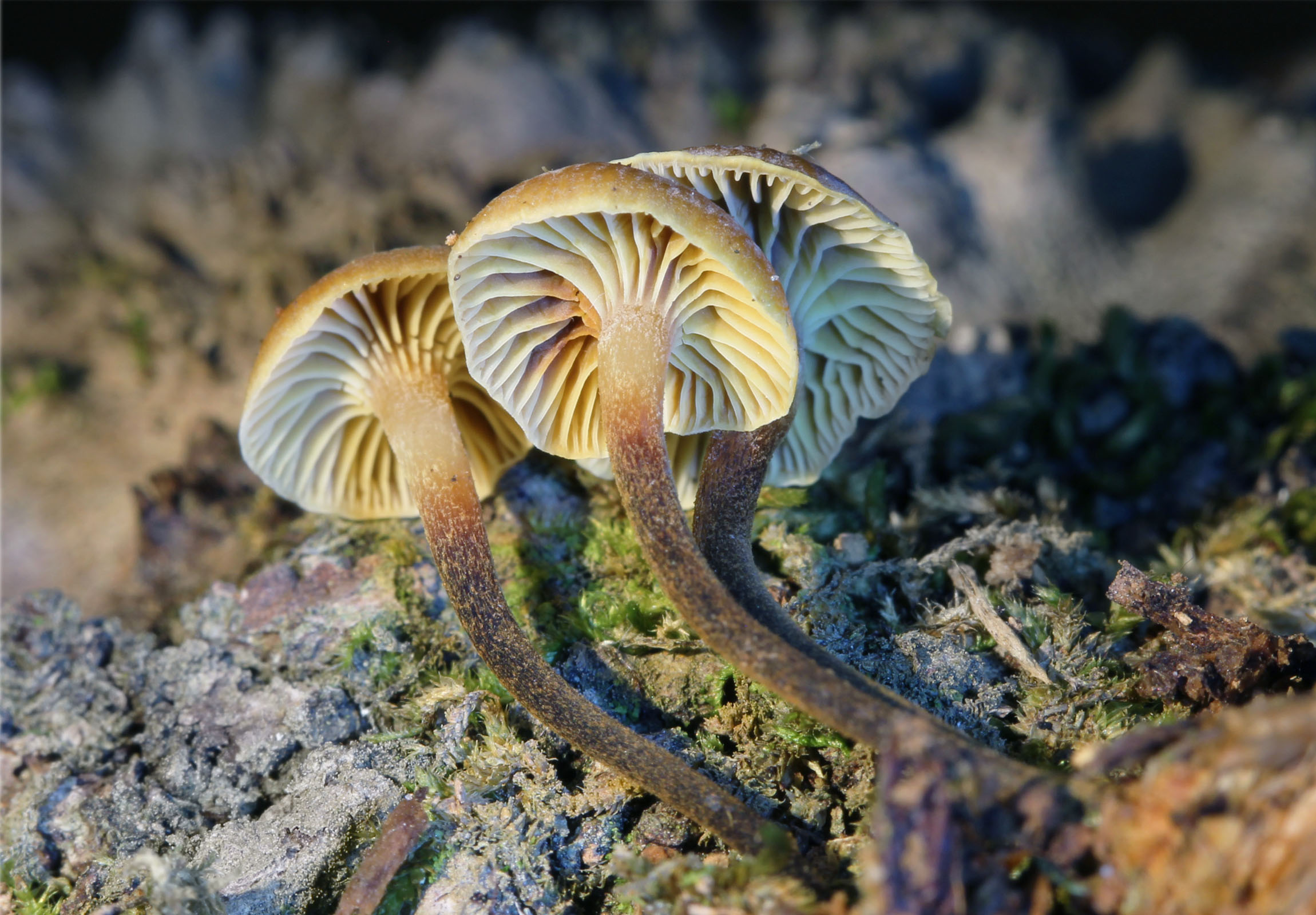

Scientific classification
- Domain: Eukaryota
- Kingdom: Fungi
- Division: Basidiomycota
- Class: Agaricomycetes
- Order: Agaricales
- Family: Mycenaceae
- Genus: Xeromphalina
- Species: X. brunneola

Binomial name
- Xeromphalina brunneola O.K.Mill. (1968)

= Xeromphalina brunneola =

Species of fungus

Xeromphalina brunneola is a species of agaric fungus in the family Mycenaceae. Found in the western United States where it grows in dense clusters on debarked conifer logs, it was described by mycologist Orson K. Miller in 1968. The type collection was made by Miller near Priest River, Idaho, in September 1964. The mushroom has a dull orange, convex to nearly flattened cap measuring 0.6–15 mm (0.02–0.59 in) in diameter. The orange-buff gills are narrow, closely spaced, and decurrently attached to the stipe. Spores are elliptical, smooth, amyloid, and measure 5.5–6.6 by 2.5–3.0 μm.
