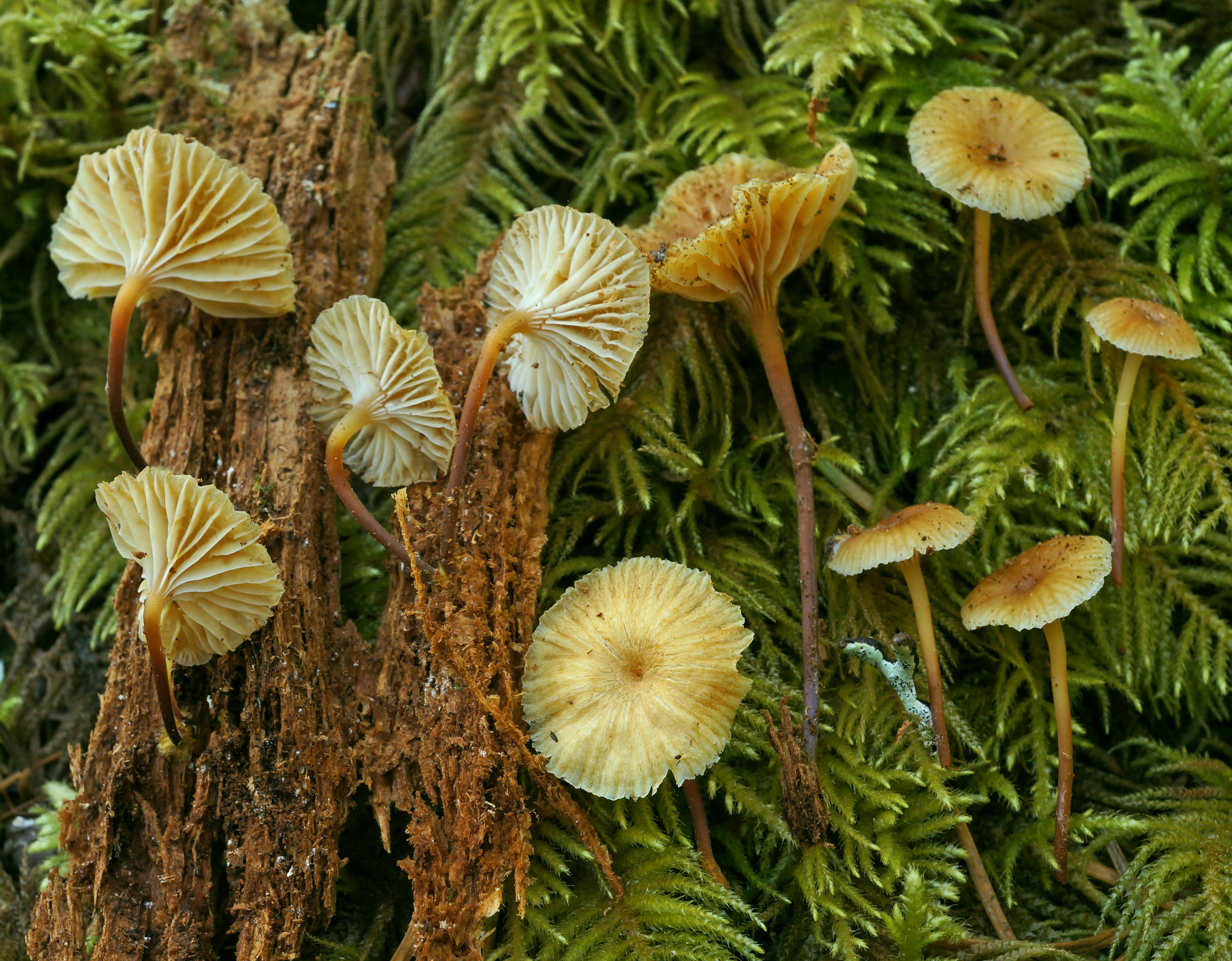

Scientific classification
- Domain: Eukaryota
- Kingdom: Fungi
- Division: Basidiomycota
- Class: Agaricomycetes
- Order: Agaricales
- Family: Mycenaceae
- Genus: Xeromphalina
- Species: X. cornui

Binomial name
- Xeromphalina cornui (Quél.) J.Favre (1936)

Synonyms
- Omphalia cornui Quél. (1877); Omphalina cornui (Quél.) Quél. (1886)

= Xeromphalina cornui =

Species of fungus

Xeromphalina cornui is a species of agaric fungus in the family Mycenaceae. It was originally described in 1866 by French mycologist Lucien Quélet as Omphalia cornui; Swiss naturalist Jules Favre transferred it to Xeromphalina in 1936.
