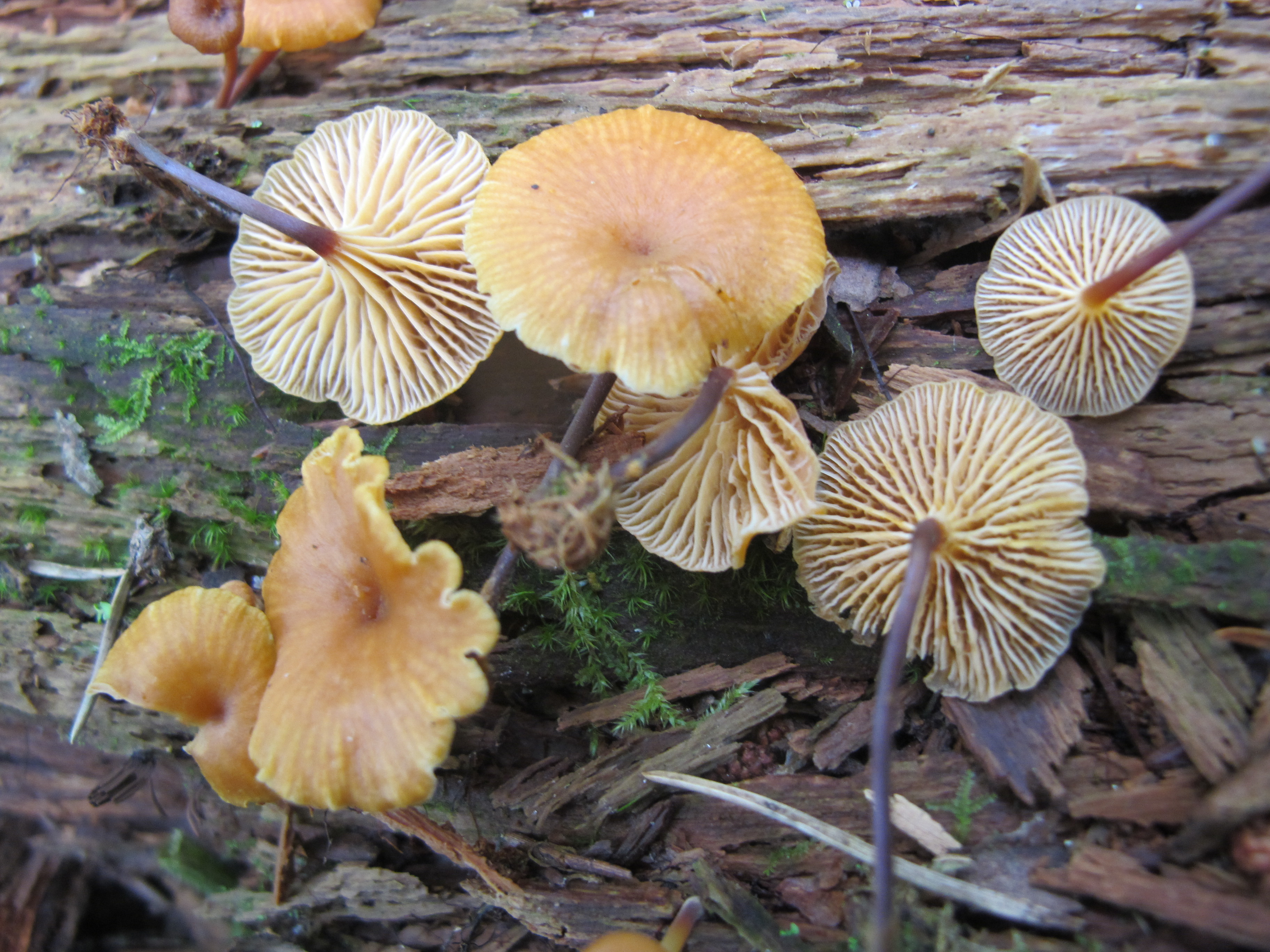

Scientific classification
- Kingdom: Fungi
- Division: Basidiomycota
- Class: Agaricomycetes
- Order: Agaricales
- Family: Mycenaceae
- Genus: Xeromphalina
- Species: X. cauticinalis

Binomial name
- Xeromphalina cauticinalis (With.) Kühner & Maire (1934)

Synonyms
- Marasmius cauticinalis Fr. (1838); Xeromphalina cauticinalis (With.) Kühner & Maire (1934); Xeromphalina fellea Maire & Malençon (1945); Xeromphalina parvibulbosa (Kauffman & A.H.Sm.) Redhead (1988)

= Xeromphalina cauticinalis =

Species of fungus

Xeromphalina cauticinalis
- Mycological characteristics
- Gills on hymenium
- Cap is convex or flat
- Hymenium is adnate or decurrent
- Stipe is bare
- Spore print is white
- Ecology is saprotrophic
- Edibility is inedible or unknown

Xeromphalina cauticinalis is a species of agaric fungus in the family Mycenaceae. Originally described in 1838 by Elias Fries as Marasmius cauticinalis, it was transferred to the genus Xeromphalina by Robert Kühner and René Maire in 1934.

The fruit bodies have convex yellowish caps measuring 0.5–2.5 cm (1/4–1 in) in diameter supported by a tough yellow-brown to dark brown stipe that is 2.5–8 cm (1–3 1/8 in) long and 0.5–2.5 millimetres (1/32–3/32 in) thick. The pale yellow gills have a decurrent attachment to the stipe and are somewhat distantly spaced. The spore print is white, while individual spores are elliptical, smooth, amyloid, and measure 4–7 by 2.5–3.5 μm.

It is found in North America, where it fruits from the summer to autumn (later on the West Coast) in conifer debris and sometimes on aspen leaves. The species is regarded as nonpoisonous.
