= Xeromphalina campanelloides =

Scientific classification
- Domain: Eukaryota
- Kingdom: Fungi
- Division: Basidiomycota
- Class: Agaricomycetes
- Order: Agaricales
- Family: Mycenaceae
- Genus: Xeromphalina
- Species: X. campanelloides

Binomial name
- Xeromphalina campanelloides Redhead (1988)

Species of fungus

Xeromphalina campanelloides is a species of Mycenaceae fungus. The fungus is known from coastal British Columbia and Washington, and eastern montane New York and Quebec. It was described as new to science in 1988 by Canadian mycologist Scott Redhead.
