= Ketchup (disambiguation) =

Ketchup is a sauce, commonly tomato based, used as a condiment.

Ketchup may also refer to:

== Other varieties of ketchup ==
- Banana ketchup
- Curry ketchup
- Fruit ketchup
- Mushroom ketchup
- Sweet soy sauce ("sweet ketchup") or other soy sauces

== Entertainment ==
- Ketchup: Cats Who Cook, a Japanese animated television series 1998–1999
- "Ketchup" (Adventure Time), a television episode
- Las Ketchup, a Spanish girl group
- Ketchup, a 2013 mixtape by Mustard
- Ketchup Eusebio, a Filipino actor, television host, comedian and singer
- Red Ketchup, a Canadian graphic novel
- Sektor, nicknamed "Ketchup", a character in the Mortal Kombat video game series

== See also ==
- Category:Condiments
- Catch Up (disambiguation)
- SketchUp, a 3D modelling software
