= John Albert Stevenson =

John Albert Stevenson (July 16, 1890, Woonsocket, South Dakota – October 30, 1979, Annandale, Virginia) was an American mycologist and phytopathologist.

== Biography ==
John Albert Stevenson spent part of his childhood in Cornucopia, Wisconsin, where he became interested in studying nature and, especially, forestry. During his secondary education, he and his family lived in Bayfield, Wisconsin, in Sioux City, Iowa, and in Minneapolis. He graduated in 1912 with a B.S. in forestry from the University of Minnesota, where he also studied plant pathology and ecology. At the University of Minnesota, his teachers included Edward Monroe Freeman, Elvin Charles Stakman, Frederic Edward Clements and Charles Edwin Bessey. In September 1914 in Minneapolis, Stevenson married Katherine Genevieve Thompson. After his graduation from the University of Minnesota, he had the intentions of becoming a plant pathologist with a higher academic credential. He attended George Washington University (D.C.) but withdrew with the status “ABT” (all but thesis).

Stevenson's mycological career began with a few years in Puerto Rico. At Puerto Rico's Insular Agricultural Experiment Station, he served as a plant quarantine inspector and herbarium curator, as well as librarian, editor of the station's publications, disbursing officer, and assistant to the station's director. In 1918, after the November WW I armistice, he departed from Puerto Rico to work in Washington, D.C. as a plant pathology inspector with the USDA's Federal Horticultural Board. He occupied in subsequent years several titled positions, one of which involved responsibility for the USDA's foreign agricultural explorations. In 1927, as the successor to James Robert Weir, Stevenson was put in charge of development of the collections at the Mycology and Disease Survey. His supervisor in the Mycology and Disease Survey was Cornelius Lott Shear. Over the years, Stevenson's duties and titles at the USDA changed, and he supervised the move in 1941 of the U.S. National Fungus Collections to Beltsville, Maryland. Stevenson reached the USDA's mandatory retirement age of 70 in 1960, but he continued work under a series of emeritus titles for the next 15 years.

Stevenson did research on fungal diseases of economically valuable crops and the taxonomy of fungi. He was the author of two major technical treatises, An Account of Fungus exsiccati: Containing Material from the Americas (1971) and The Fungi of Puerto Rico and the American Virgin Islands (1975), and more than scientific 100 articles. He was an honorary curator of fungi in the Smithsonian Institution's botany department.

Stevenson was a collector, not only of specimens of fungi and plants, but also books and stamps. He collected a huge amount of scientific literature on mycology and phytopathology — frequently with his own private funds. In 1976, he donated to the Smithsonian Institution his mycological library of more than 6,000 volumes with the proviso that the donated library should remain part of the National Fungus Collections at the USDA's Beltsville location. The John A. Stevenson Library of the Systematic Botany and Mycology Laboratory in Beltsville is an important archival resource. The John A. Stevenson Reference Room houses the library, which in 1986 had approximately 7,000 books and journals and 60,000 reprints of scientific articles. Stevenson's collection is outstanding in rare books on mycology. One of the books was published in 1675 and many in the collection were published in the 18th century.

He received a number of awards, including the USDA's Superior Service Award.

Stevenson was one of the founding members of the Mycological Society of America and served a term as its president. In 1957 he was the president of the Botanical Society of Washington (established in 1901). He held executive positions with the American Phytopathological Society and the Washington Academy of Sciences (established in 1898).

Upon his death he was survived by his widow, three sons, eight grandchildren, and four great-grandchildren.

== Selected publications ==
=== Articles ===
- Johnston, John R.; Stevenson, John A. (1917). "Sugar-cane fungi and diseases of Porto Rico". Journal of the Department of Agriculture of Puerto Rico: 177–246.
- Stevenson, John A. (1918). "Citrus diseases of Porto Rico". Jour. Dept. Agr. Porto Rico. 2: 43–123.
- ——; Rands, R. D. (1938). "An annotated list of the fungi and bacteria associated with Sugarcane and its products". Hawaiian Planters' Record. 49 (4): 247–314.
- —— (1945). "Ferns and Fungi". American Fern Journal. 35 (4): 97–104. Bibcode:1945AmFJ...35...97S. doi:10.2307/1545645. JSTOR 1545645.
- ——; Imle, Ernest P. (1945). "Periconia Blight of Hevea". Mycologia. 37 (5): 576–581. doi:10.1080/00275514.1945.12024016.
- Lefebvre, C. L.; —— (1945). "The Fungus Causing Zonate Leafspot of Cowpea". Mycologia. 37: 37–45. doi:10.1080/00275514.1945.12023967.
- —— (1954). "Plants, Problems, and Personalities: The Genesis of the Bureau of Plant Industry". Agricultural History. 28 (4): 155–162. JSTOR 3740510.
- —— (1955). "The National Fungus Collections". Taxon. 4 (8): 181–185. Bibcode:1955Taxon...4..181S. doi:10.2307/1216799. JSTOR 1216799.
- Deighton, F. C.; ——; Cummins, G. B. (1962). "Formae Speciales and the Code". Taxon. 11 (3): 70–71. Bibcode:1962Taxon..11...70D. doi:10.2307/1216019. JSTOR 1216019.
- —— (1967). "Rabenhorst and Fungus Exsiccati". Taxon. 16 (2): 112–119. Bibcode:1967Taxon..16..112S. doi:10.2307/1216893. JSTOR 1216893.
- —— (1970). "Highlights in the History of the Botanical Society of Washington". Journal of the Washington Academy of Sciences. 60 (4): 141–155. JSTOR 24536045.

=== Books and monographs ===
- Stevenson, John Albert (1918). A Check List of Porto Rican Fungi and a Host Index [exclusive of the Lichens or Algicolous Fungi]. ASIN B00087EHJ0.
- —— (1926). Foreign Plant Diseases: A Manual of Economic Plant Diseases which are New to or Not Widely Distributed in the United States.
- ——; Cash, Edith Katherine (1936). "The new fungus names proposed by C.G. Lloyd". Lloyd Library & Museum Bulletin. 35 (8): 1–209. ASIN B000863JFY. OL 16634659M.
- —— (1971). An Account of Fungus exsiccati: Containing Material from the Americas. Beihefte zur Nova Hedwigia; Heft 36. ISBN 9783768254366. LCCN 70884439. OL 5744487M; vii+563 pages synopsis
- —— (1975). The Fungi of Puerto Rico and the American Virgin Islands. Contributions of Reed Herbarium; no. 23. Reed Herbarium. LCCN 75308775. OL 1475080W; iv+743 pages
