= U.S. National Fungus Collections =

National fungus is housed in US Department of Agriculture

The National Fungus Collections of the United States is the "world's largest herbarium of dried fungus specimens". It is housed within the United States Department of Agriculture (USDA).

The collection was established in 1869 from a core of fungus collections transferred from the Smithsonian Institution to the USDA. Frank Lamson-Scribner (1885-1891) and Franklin S. Earle (1891-1896) were the first two directors, followed by Flora Wambaugh Patterson in 1896. Patterson vastly increased the size of the collection from approximately 19,000 reference specimens to almost 115,000.

Patterson and other mycologists at the collection during Patterson's tenure, including Vera K. Charles, identified numerous commercially threatening fungi, including the bubble disease of mushrooms (1909), the potato wart disease (Synchytrium endobioticum), and chestnut blight. These and other invasive diseases led to the passage of the Plant Quarantine Act of 1912.

These scientists were part of a wave of government-funded research into agriculture and disease. Vera Charles also worked on fungal pathogens of insects. The National Fungus Collection also hired a number of other scientists all of whom did significant work on economically important crops. These included Anna E. Jenkins, hired in 1912, who became the "foremost authority" on spot-anthracnose fungi. Edith K. Cash, hired in 1913, investigated discomycetes (cup fungi) and William W. Diehl (hired in 1917) wrote extensively on Balansia which causes sterility in grass plants.

After Patterson's retirement, James R. Weir ran the collection for four years; his work at the collection ultimately led to use of Neurospora as a model organism for genetic research.
