= Flora Wambaugh Patterson =

American mycologist (1847–1928)

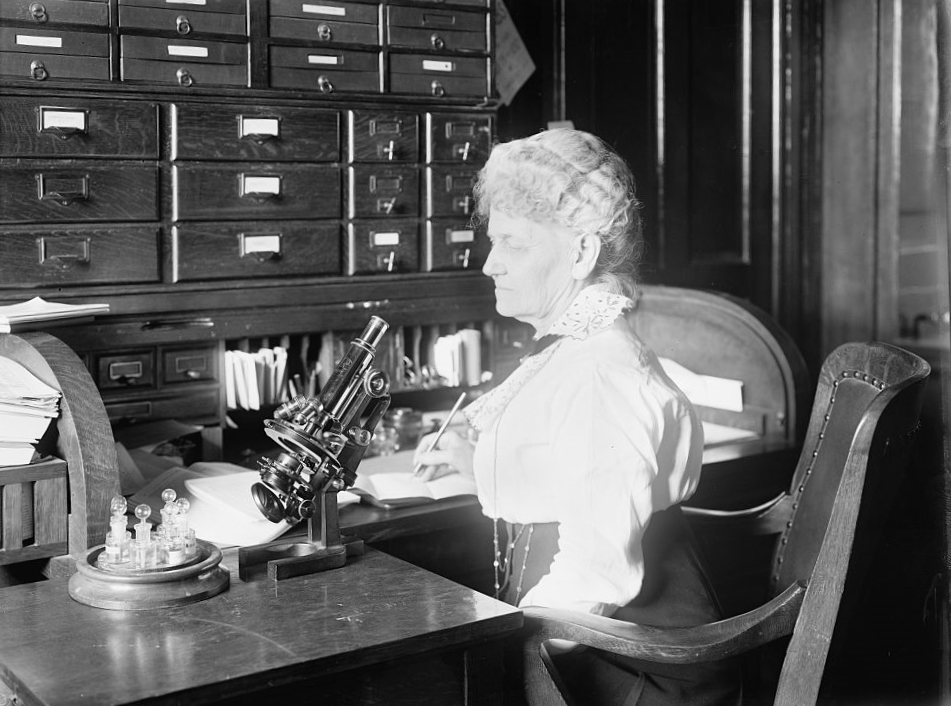
- Patterson at microscope
- Born: September 15, 1847; Columbus, Ohio, US
- Died: February 5, 1928 (aged 80); New York City, US
- Education: Antioch College; Ohio Wesleyan Female College; Radcliffe College
- Occupations: Plant pathologist, mycologist
- Employer(s): Gray Herbarium, United States Department of Agriculture
- Children: 2

Flora Wambaugh Patterson (September 15, 1847–February 5, 1928) was an American mycologist, and the first female plant pathologist hired by the United States Department of Agriculture. She ran the US National Fungus Collections for almost thirty years, adding over 90,000 fungal specimens and expanding the collection six-fold, making it the largest of its kind in the world. Patterson and her team discovered several species of disease-causing fungi that infect plants and pose a significant threat to agriculture. Although modern agricultural practices can now keep many of these threats in check, pathogenic fungi still have the ability to decimate crop yield with devastating consequences. Patterson’s work provided a basis for federal legislation to establish mechanisms to help prevent the introduction of new fungal plant diseases in the U.S.

== Early life and education ==
Flora Wambaugh was born in Columbus, Ohio, to Sarah Sells (Wambaugh) and Methodist minister A. B. Wambaugh. She studied fungi as a hobby during her childhood. In 1865, at age 18, Wambaugh earned a bachelor’s degree from Antioch College in Ohio. She married Captain Edwin Patterson in 1869, assuming his name, and they had two children. When her husband was badly injured in a steamboat explosion just a few years after their marriage, Patterson cared for him for 10 years before he died, leaving her to support herself and her sons.

Patterson received a master’s degree from Ohio Wesleyan Female College when she was 42, and after her husband’s death, she continued her studies at the University of Iowa, where her brother was a professor. She pursued a master’s degree in botany and, in 1892 or 1893, sought to further her studies at Yale University. However, her application was rejected because Yale did not admit women until 1969. Undeterred, Patterson followed her brother and relocated to Cambridge, Massachusetts. She began studying at Radcliffe College, the all-women’s sister school to Harvard College. Over the next three years, she attended classes and worked at Harvard’s Gray Herbarium, where she developed her mycology expertise by preparing and working on fungal samples.

== Research and scientific career ==
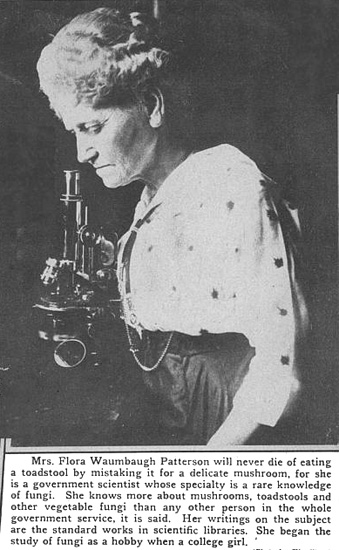
Flora Patterson featured in the Washington Star

In 1895, the 48-year-old Patterson took the civil service examination and landed a job at the USDA as a plant pathologist. Beverly T. Galloway hired Patterson at the same time as Franklin Sumner Earle. During her almost thirty-year tenure at the USDA, Patterson increased the size of the U.S. National Fungus Collections by almost six-fold, from 19,000 to 115,000 reference specimens, making it the largest in the world. She earned the title “Mycologist in Charge of Mycological and Pathological Collections,” which she held until her retirement in 1923.

During her career, Patterson identified numerous new species of fungus, including those causing pineapple rot (Thielaviopsis paradoxa), peach leaf curl (Taphrina), and "witches' broom" on bamboo (Loculistroma bambusae), which was an entirely new genus. Together with Edith Katherine Cash and William Webster Diehl, she issued the exsiccata-like series Mycological Exchange of 1921 with specimens distributed by the USDA.

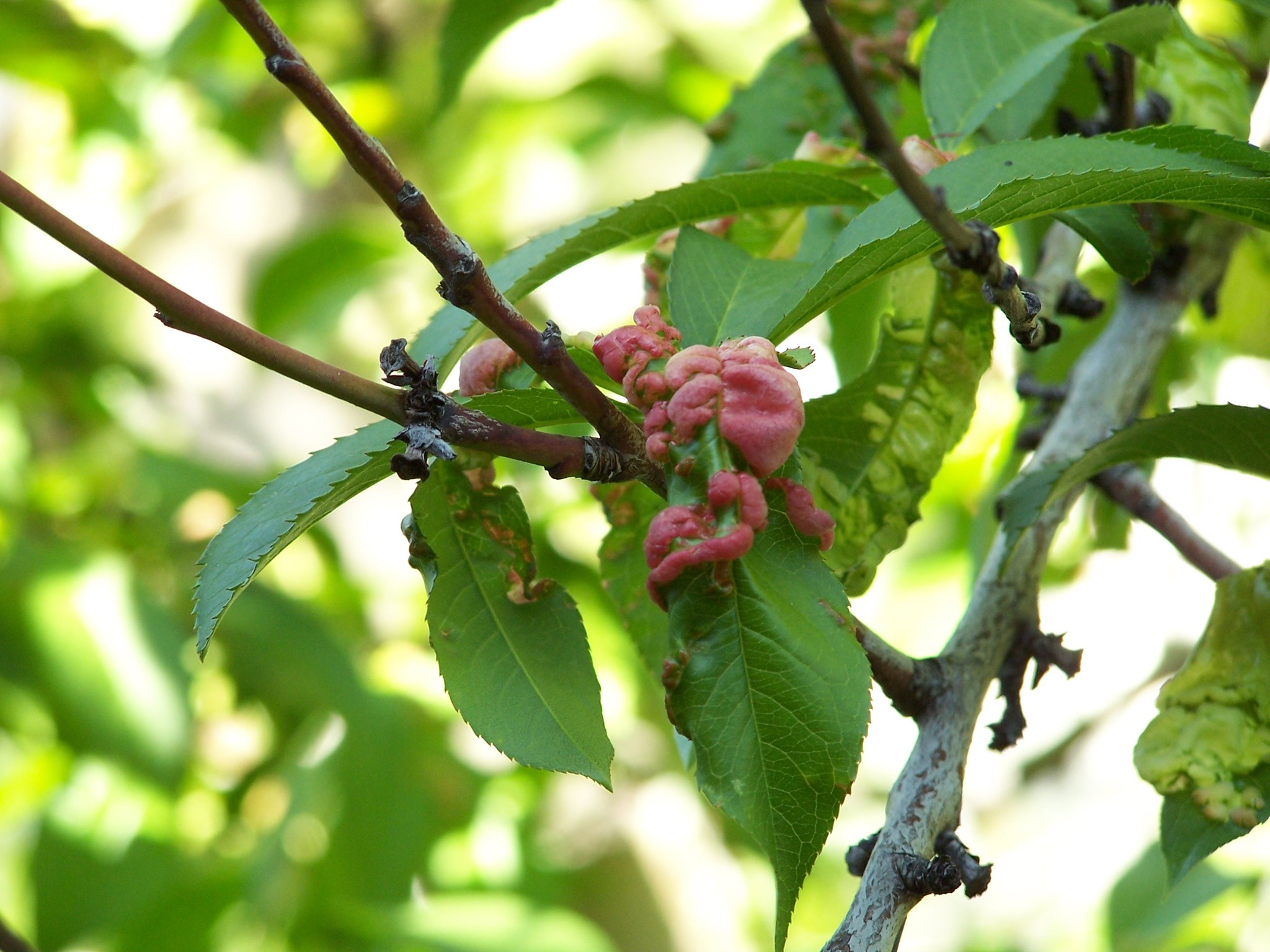
Peach Leaf Curl (Taphrina deformans)

Among other responsibilities, Patterson was in charge of identifying new fungal pathogens and led efforts to identify the cause of a chestnut blight that wiped out the iconic chestnut forests in eastern North America as well as the fungus behind potato wart disease, Synchytrium endobioticum. Patterson is credited with being the first person to suggest that a fungal pathogen had caused the Chesnut (Chestnut) blight in 1904. Following the blight, Patterson advocated for a plant quarantine to protect native species from foreign imports, but made little headway.

That all changed several years later when Congress passed the Plant Quarantine Act of 1912 to prevent the introduction of invasive, harmful diseases on U.S. soil. In 1910, Patterson and her colleagues at the USDA inspected a shipment of 2,000 cherry trees, a gift from the Mayor of Japan, and determined that they were diseased. As Mycologist in Charge, Patterson wrote a letter to David Fairchild at the Office of Seed and Plant Introduction explaining that nearly half of the trees were infected with crown gall disease, which causes abnormal, tumor-like growths on roots, trunks and branches. Fearing that the cause might be an invasive pathogen, Patterson and colleagues recommended destroying the cherry trees. The trees were ultimately burned in a massive bonfire on the Mall in Washington D.C. and later replaced by a second shipment from the Mayor of Japan - a collection of trees that can be seen in Washington to this day.

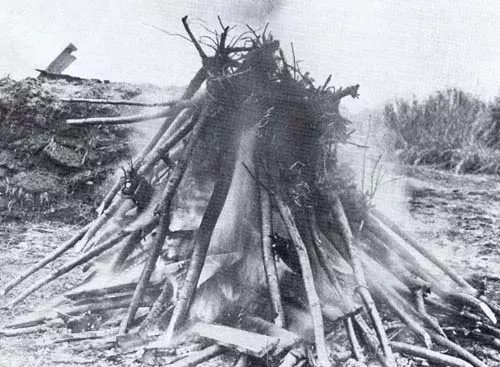
The first set of Japanese cherry trees being burned on the mall following the discovery of potentially harmful plant pathogens and insects

Patterson authored over a dozen publications during her career. The two most popular were bulletins geared toward a general audience called “Mushrooms and Other Common Fungi” and the other “Some common edible and poisonous mushrooms.” Both included descriptions of edible fungi and cooking recipes, including one for mushroom catsup.

She was a fellow of the American Association for the Advancement of Science and Fellow of the Botanical Society of America as well as a member of five other professional societies included the American Association of University Women.

== Personal life ==
Patterson was married and had two children before her husband died from injuries sustained in a steamboat explosion. When her sons were old enough, she sent them to boarding school so she could pursue her studies. Patterson worked for the USDA for 27 years before retiring at the age of 75. During her tenure, the USDA hired three other female mycologists. She lived the final years of her life in New York City with one of her sons and died in 1928 at age 80.

== Selected publications ==
- Patterson, F. W. 1894. Species of Taphrina parasitic on Populus. Proc. Amer. Assoc. Advan. Sci. 43:293-294.
- Patterson, F. W. 1895. A study of North American parasitic Exoascaceae. Iowa Univ. Bull. Lab. Nat. Hist. 3:89-135.
- Patterson, F. W., Charles, V. K., and Veihmeyer, F. J. 1910. Some fungous diseases of economic importance. I.-Miscellaneous Diseases. II. Pineapple rot caused by Thielaviopsis paradoxa. USDA, Bureau of Plant Industry, Bull. No. 171.
- Patterson, F. W., and Charles, V. K. 1915. Mushrooms and other common fungi. USDA Bulletin No. 175.
- Patterson, F. W., and Charles, V. K. 1917. Some common edible and poisonous mushrooms. USDA Farmer’s Bulletin No. 796

== Further research ==
- Rossman, A. Y. (2002). "Flora W. Patterson: The First Woman Mycologist at the USDA". The Plant Health Instructor. doi:10.1094/PHI-I-2002-0815-01. Archived from the original on 2013-09-27.
- Charles, Vera K. (1929). "Mrs. Flora Wambaugh Patterson". Mycologia. 21 (1): 1–4. doi:10.1080/00275514.1929.12016928. JSTOR 3753853.
- Galloway, Beverly T. (1928). "Flora W. Patterson 1847-1928". Phytopathology. 18: 877–879.
- "Women's Who's Who of America" (1982)
- Maron, Dina Fina (2024). "The Forgotten Fungal Detective," National Geographic. 245 (4) [April]: 27.
