= Catch Up =

Catch Up, Catch Up TV, or variants may refer to:

== Television ==
- "Catch-up television", viewing past programmes via:
  - Streaming television
  - Video on demand
- Catch Up (Canadian TV series), a 1978–1979 Canadian children's television series
- The Catch-Up, 2007 talk show on Australian daytime TV
- The Catch Up (BBC), British news programme
- Catch Up, a 1989-1991 German professional wrestling TV show featuring matches from the Catch Wrestling Association and various American promotions, mainly WCW
- TVCatchup, a UK company offering Internet television products

== Music ==
- "Catch Up" (song), a 2020 song by Chloe x Halle
- "0 to 100 / The Catch Up", a 2014 song by Drake
- Catch Up, an album by the Japanese punk rock band Wanima

== Other uses ==
- Ketchup, a condiment formerly sometimes spelled 'catchup'
- Catch-up effect, a hypothesis that poorer countries' incomes will grow faster than rich countries'
- Catch-up growth, accelerated growth of an organism
