= Diehliomyces =

Scientific classification
- Kingdom: Fungi
- Division: Ascomycota
- Class: incertae sedis
- Order: incertae sedis
- Family: incertae sedis
- Genus: Diehliomyces; Gilkey

Type species
- Diehliomyces microsporus (Diehl & E.B. Lamb.) Gilkey

Genus of fungi

Diehliomyces is a genus of fungi in the Ascomycota phylum. The relationship of this taxon to other taxa within the phylum is unknown (incertae sedis), and it has not yet been placed with certainty into any class, order, or family. This is a monotypic genus, containing the single species Diehliomyces microsporus.

The genus name of Diehliomyces is in honour of William Webster Diehl (1891–1978), who was an American mycologist recognized for his work on grass pathogens, particularly in the genus Balansia.

The genus was circumscribed by Helen Margaret Gilkey in Mycologia Vol.46 (Issue 5) on page 789 in 1954.

== See also ==
- List of Ascomycota genera incertae sedis
