= Louise Jensen Stakman =

American plant pathologist

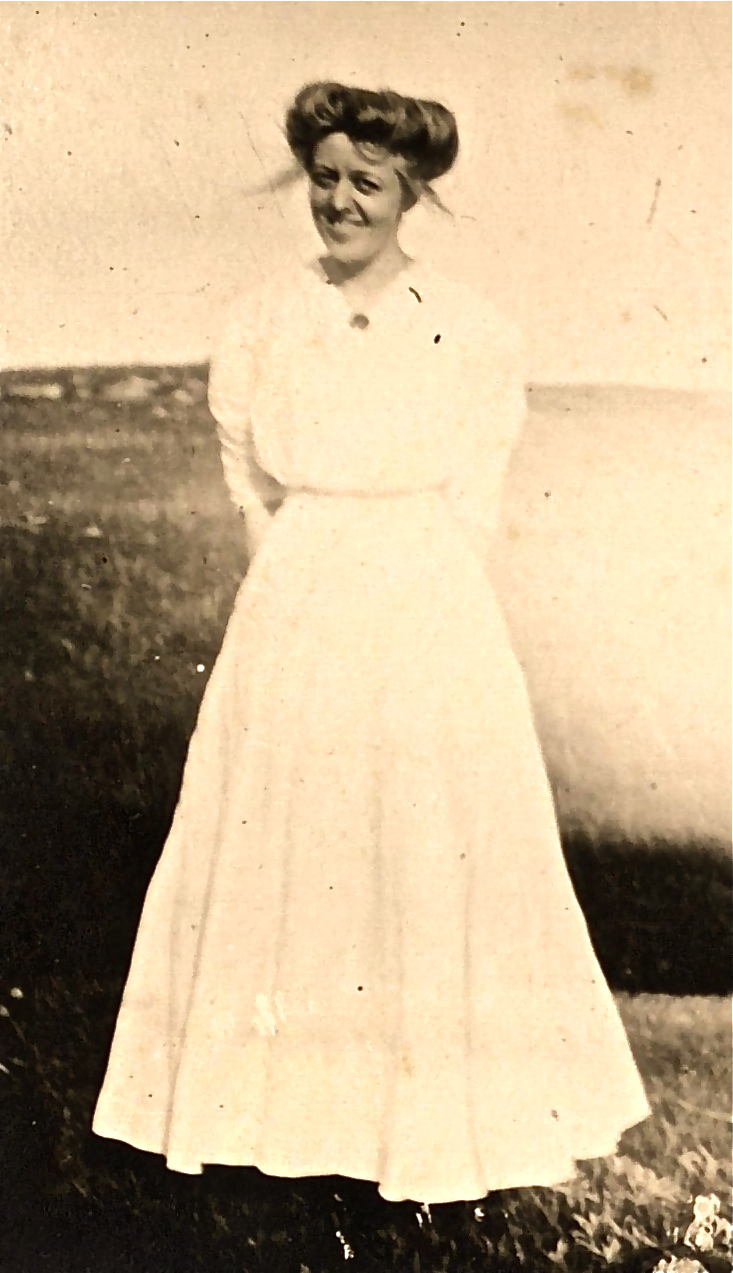
- Born: Estelle Louise Jensen; May 25, 1888; Minneapolis, Minnesota
- Died: January 10, 1962 (aged 73)
- Resting place: Sunset Memorial Park Cemetery, Minneapolis, Minnesota
- Education: University of Minnesota, Smith College
- Scientific career
- Fields: Plant pathology

Louise Jensen Stakman (May 25, 1888 – January 10, 1962) was an American plant pathologist.

== Early life ==
On May 25, 1888, Estelle Louise Jensen was born in Minneapolis, Minnesota.

== Education ==
Jensen received an A.B. degree from the University of Minnesota in 1909 and an A.M. degree from Smith College in 1910.

== Career ==
From 1912 to 1913, Jensen was a xylotomist for the recently formed Forest Products Laboratory of the Department of Agriculture. During the period 1913–1917, Jensen was an instructor in mycology for the University of Minnesota and a researcher at the Minnesota Agricultural Experiment Station. Her research interests included imperfect fungi that are pathogens of cereals.

== Personal life ==
In 1917, Jensen married Professor Elvin C. Stakman. They had no children. On January 10, 1962, she died suddenly and unexpectedly in Minnesota, aged 73. She is buried as Louise Jensen Stakman at Sunset Memorial Park Cemetery in Minneapolis, Minnesota.

== Selected publications ==
- Stakman, Louise J. (July 1920). A Helminthosporium Disease of Wheat and Rye. Bulletin. Vol. 191. St. Paul, MN: University of Minnesota Agricultural Experiment Station.
- Stakman, Louise J. (1923). "Some fungi causing root and foot rots of cereals". Studies in Plant Science. University of Minnesota: 140–153.

== Bibliography ==
- Bailey, Martha J., ed. (1994), "Jensen, (Estelle) Louise", American Women in Science: A Biographical Dictionary, Denver, CO: ABC-CLIO, pp. 184–185, ISBN 0-87436-740-9
