= Margaret Newton =

Phytopathologist and mycologist

- Born: 20 April 1887; Montreal, Quebec, Canada
- Died: 6 April 1971 (aged 83); Victoria, British Columbia, Canada
- Education: Macdonald College (McGill University)
- Known for: Stem rust research
- Awards: Flavelle Medal (1948)
- Scientific career
- Fields: Plant pathology, mycology
- Thesis: Studies in wheat stem rust (Puccinia graminis tritici) (1922)
- Doctoral advisor: Elvin C. Stakman

Margaret Brown Newton FRSC (20 April 1887 – 6 April 1971) was a Canadian plant pathologist and mycologist internationally renowned for her pioneering research in stem rust Puccinia graminis, particularly for its effect on the staple Canadian agricultural product wheat.

Newton never married, and was regarded as a friendly and persistent individual with drive and a warm personality. She often "worked to the point of exhaustion".

== Early life ==
Newton was born in Montreal on 20 April 1887 to John Newton and Elizabeth Brown. She had four younger siblings, three brothers named Robert, John, and William, and a sister named Dorothy. Her father was a chemist interested in the application of science to farming.

Her formal education began in a one-room schoolhouse at North Nation Mills, a mill town of about 300 residents on the Petite-Nation River north of Plaisance. The family moved to Montreal when her father took a higher-paying job. There, Newton completed middle school and two years of high school, after which the family returned to Plaisance. Here, Newton completed high school, attended country school for two more years, then taught at the North Nation Mills schoolhouse for one year. She then moved to Vankleek Hill in Ontario, continuing her education at Vankleek Hill Collegiate Institute before completing her teacher training at the Toronto Normal School.

She then taught in Lachine for three years, and at the North Nation Mills schoolhouse for one year. The money she saved was used to finance her post-secondary education.

Passionate about art, Newton enrolled in an Arts program at McMaster University in Hamilton, Ontario, completing one year of studies before returning to Montreal, where she enrolled in an agricultural program at Macdonald College. There, she was the only female in a class of 50 students, and was the recipient of the Governor General's Academic Medal for top achievement. At this time, she joined the Quebec Society for the Protection of Plants, becoming its first female member. She was also a member of the debating society, and president of the literary society for one year. In her second year at Macdonald College, She took W.P. Fraser’s mycology course and became interested in his research on cereal rust diseases of plants, which led to her interest and study in plant pathology.

Her advisor W.P. Fraser travelled to Western Canada in 1917 so he could begin researching stem rust from a devastating epidemic in 1916 that had destroyed 100 million bushels of wheat worth about $200 million. He assigned Newton to study the samples he collected, who accepted only after the school's dean eliminated restrictions on women using laboratory facilities at night; she still had to contend with the 22:00 curfew of her residence. During her research, she discovered that stem rust spores infected wheat with different rapaciousness.

Newton and her friend Pearl Clayton Stanford graduated in 1918 with a Bachelor of Science in Agriculture (B.S.A.), becoming the first women to complete a degree at the college. The next year, she received a Master of Science (M.Sc.) degree, for which her thesis The Resistance of Wheat Varieties to Puccinia graminis covered "different spore forms within the stem rust fungus". Throughout, her academic achievement was the top of her class.

== Research ==
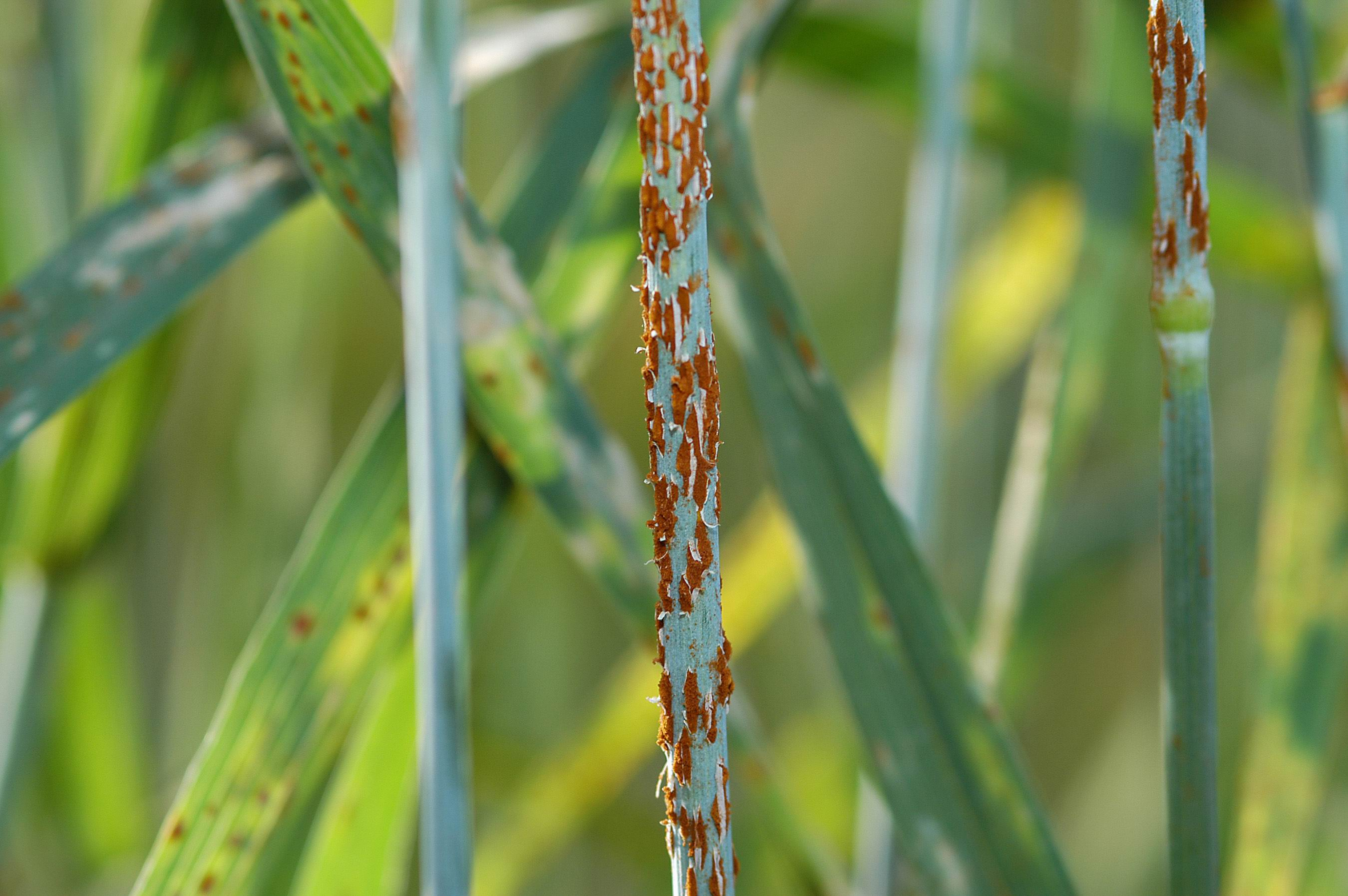
Stem rust Puccinia graminis on a stalk of wheat.

In 1920, as a result of her research into grain rusts while completing her undergraduate and master's degrees at Macdonald College, she was offered a research position at the University of Saskatchewan in Saskatoon. She accepted, and from 1922 to 1925 was on faculty as an assistant professor in the Department of Biology, joining her former advisor W.P. Fraser, among which duties was included teaching. During this time, she conducted her doctoral studies at the University of Minnesota, where under the supervision of Elvin C. Stakman she was the first woman in Canada to complete her Doctor of Philosophy (Ph.D.) in agricultural science in 1922 with the dissertation Studies in wheat stem rust (Puccinia graminis tritici). Stakman had also been researching stem rust. She did this by spending six months in Minnesota, then six months in Saskatoon.

In 1925, she was invited by William Richard Motherwell, the federal Minister of Agriculture, to help manage the newly opened Dominion Rust Research Laboratory at the University of Manitoba in Winnipeg, established as a response to rust outbreaks in 1916, 1919, and 1921. She was appointed the laboratory's senior plant pathologist, a position she maintained until retirement, and brought with her former student Thorvaldur Johnson as her research assistant. She established an annual stem rust survey in Western Canada, discovering a diversity of races in rust populations, which eventually enabled her to discover and catalogue the wheat species and cross-species resistant to stem rust.

She published 45 scientific papers on stem rust fungi and 11 research summaries. In 1929, she became a charter member of the Canadian Phytopathological Society and became one of the editors for the journal Phytopathology. Newton identified physiologically distinct races of Puccinia graminis and focused on determining their genetic structure, physiology, origin, and life cycle. She investigated stripe rust on wheat and barley and wheat leaf rust, and the environmental factors on disease expression in wheat plants. She also researched the genetic structure of wheat rust pathogens.

The research attracted global attention, particularly from scientists in grain-growing nations dealing with productivity losses from stem rust. She was by this time internationally regarded as an authority on plant rusts, and represented Canada at scientific conventions in the United States, Europe, and Russia. Her research was economically significant, as it was used to develop rust-resistant wheat cultivars and resulted in a "reduction of annual losses of wheat due to rust from 30 million bushels to practically none". Wheat rust is no longer a significant problem in Canada.

In 1933 the Government of the Soviet Union, worried about persistent crop losses caused by stem rust, invited Newton to Leningrad at the behest of Nikolai Vavilov to "train fifty carefully selected students in the problems of rust research". She was there for three months, during which she enjoyed a privileged status similar to a Russian official, and was shown every phase of plant research conducted at the Lenin Academy of Agricultural Sciences. Vavilov had attempted to lure her to work in Leningrad in 1930 by offering a generous salary, technical support, and a camel caravan for travel.

== Retirement ==
Her continued exposure to stem rust spores exacerbated a respiratory ailment, which would lead to an early retirement in 1945 and a move to Victoria. Farmers petitioned on her behalf for the Government of Canada to grant her a full pension, as she had "saved the country millions of dollars".

In retirement, she continued to share her expertise, travelling to Russia and Africa to assist in rust mitigation programs, and attending conventions and conferences. In 1950, she attended the International Botanical Congress in Sweden and the International Federation of University Women conference in Switzerland.

She became active in women's groups and tended a garden at her home, and had active hobbies including birdwatching and canoeing.

Newton died in Victoria on 6 April 1971.

== Legacy and awards ==
Newton earned many awards and honours throughout her life. In 1942, she became the second woman to be elected a Fellow of the Royal Society of Canada (FRSC) after Alice Wilson. She was awarded the Flavelle Medal from the Royal Society of Canada in 1948, the first person to graduate from an agricultural college to receive the award, and the only woman to have earned that distinction.

In 1956, the University of Minnesota gave her an Outstanding Achievement Award, presented by her Ph.D. advisor Elvin Stakman, and on 13 May 1969 the University of Saskatchewan gave her an honorary Doctor of Laws (LL.D.) degree. In 1964, the University of Victoria completed construction of the first phase of a residence complex for female students; one of the four-storey buildings was named Margaret Newton Hall in her honour. The others were named for Emily Carr, David Thompson, and Arthur Currie.

On 1997 September 22, she was registered in the Persons of National Historic Significance, a register of people designated by the Government of Canada as being nationally significant in the history of the country. A plaque was installed at the Fort Garry campus of the University of Manitoba to recognize this honour. Newton was inducted to the Canadian Science and Engineering Hall of Fame in 1991. On 17 July 2008, she was inducted into the Manitoba Agricultural Hall of Fame, and a plaque in her honour was erected in Portage la Prairie and officially revealed in a ceremony attended by her relatives and "representatives from grain research centres".

Newton's research is depicted in the poster gallery created by Ingenium Canada's The Women in STEM initiative. This poster gallery is a collaborative effort between the three Ingenium museums: Canada Agriculture and Food, Canada Aviation and Space, and Canada Science and Technology and their partners to support the engagement, advancement and furtherance of women in STEM.

Newton is recognized as a Women of Impact in Canada for her scientific contributions as a woman in STEM (science, technology, engineering and math). This online gallery was created by the Canadian Government (Women and Gender and Equity Canada) to promote women's achievements and features profiles of courageous women who have made an impact in politics, the arts and sciences, and countless other fields.

== Works ==
- Newton, Margaret; Johnson, Thorvaldur; Brown, Archibald M. (1930). "A preliminary study on the hybridization of physiologic forms of Puccinia graminis tritici". Scientific Agriculture. 10 (11): 721–731.
- Newton, Margaret; Johnson, Thorvaldur; Brown, Archibald M. (1930). "A study of the inheritance of spore colour and pathogenicity in crosses between physiologic forms of Puccinia graminis tritici". Scientific Agriculture. 10 (12): 775–798.
- Newton, Margaret; Johnson, Thorvaldur (1934). "Studies on the nature of disease resistance in cereals: i. the reactions to rust of mature and immature tissues". Canadian Journal of Research. 11 (5): 564–581. Bibcode:1934CJRes..11..564N. doi:10.1139/cjr34-113.
- Newton, Margaret; Johnson, Thorvaldur (1936). "Stripe rust, Puccinia glucarum, in Canada". Canadian Journal of Research. 14c (2): 89–108. doi:10.1139/cjr36c-008.
- Newton, Margaret; Johnson, Thorvaldur (1937). "The effect of high temperatures on uredial development in cereal rusts". Canadian Journal of Research. 15c (9): 425–432. doi:10.1139/cjr37c-032.
- Newton, Margaret; Johnson, Thorvaldur (1938). "The origin of abnormal rust characteristics through the inbreeding of physiologic races of Puccinia graminis tritici". Canadian Journal of Research. 16c (1): 38–52. doi:10.1139/cjr38c-004.
- Newton, Margaret; Johnson, Thorvaldur (1939). "A mutation for pathogenicity in puccinia graminis tritici". Canadian Journal of Research. 17c (9): 297–299. doi:10.1139/cjr39c-027.
- Newton, Margaret; Peturson, Bjorn (1939). "The effect of leaf rust on the yield and quality of thatcher and renown wheat in 1938". Canadian Journal of Research. 17c (11): 380–387. doi:10.1139/cjr39c-038.
- Newton, Margaret; Johnson, Thorvaldur (1940). "Crossing and selfing studies with physiologic races of oat stem rust". Canadian Journal of Research. 18c (2): 54–67. doi:10.1139/cjr40c-008.
- Newton, Margaret; Johnson, Thorvaldur (1940). "The influence of light and certain other environmental factors on the mature-plant resistance of hope wheat to stem rust". Canadian Journal of Research. 18c (8): 357–371. doi:10.1139/cjr40c-034.
- Newton, Margaret; Johnson, Thorvaldur; Peturnson, B. (1940). "Seedling reactions of wheat varieties to stem rust and leaf rust and of oat varieties to stem rust and crown rust". Canadian Journal of Research. 18c (10): 489–506. doi:10.1139/cjr40c-044.
- Newton, Margaret; Johnson, Thorvaldur (1940). "Mendelian inheritance of certain pathogenic characters of Puccinia graminis tritici". Canadian Journal of Research. 18c (12): 599–611. doi:10.1139/cjr40c-056.
- Newton, Margaret; Johnson, Thorvaldur (1941). "Environmental reaction of physiologic races of puccinia triticina and their distribution in Canada". Canadian Journal of Research. 19c (4): 121–133. doi:10.1139/cjr41c-017.
- Newton, Margaret; Johnson, Thorvaldur (1941). "The effect of high temperature on the stem rust resistance of wheat varieties". Canadian Journal of Research. 19c (11): 438–445. doi:10.1139/cjr41c-043.
- Newton, Margaret; Johnson, Thorvaldur (1943). "Adult plant resistance in wheat to physiologic races of Puccinia triticina erikss". Canadian Journal of Research. 21c (1): 10–17. doi:10.1139/cjr43c-002.
- Newton, Margaret; Johnson, Thorvaldur (1943). "The inheritance of a mutant character in puccinia graminis tritici". Canadian Journal of Research. 21c (7): 205–210. doi:10.1139/cjr43c-017.
- Newton, Margaret; Johnson, Thorvaldur (1944). "Physiologic specialization of oat stem rust in Canada". Canadian Journal of Research. 22c (5): 201–216. doi:10.1139/cjr44c-017.
- Newton, Margaret; Peturson, Bjorn; Whiteside, A.G.O (1945). "The effect of leaf rust on the yield and quality of wheat". Canadian Journal of Research. 23c (4): 105–114. doi:10.1139/cjr45c-008.
- Newton, Margaret; Peturson, Bjorn; Meredith, W.O.S. (1945). "The effect of leaf rust of barley on the yield and quality of barley varieties". Canadian Journal of Research. 23c (6): 212–218. doi:10.1139/cjr45c-018.
- Newton, Margaret; Johnson, Thorvaldur (1946). "Physiologic races of puccinia graminis tritici in canada, 1919 to 1944". Canadian Journal of Research. 24c (2): 26–38. doi:10.1139/cjr46c-005.
- Johnson, Thorvaldur; Newton, Margaret (June 1946). "Specialization, hybridization, and mutation in the cereal rusts". The Botanical Review. 12 (6): 337–392. Bibcode:1946BotRv..12..337J. doi:10.1007/BF02861524. S2CID 30757774.
- Newton, Margaret; Cherewick, W.J. (1947). "Erysiphe graminis in Canada". Canadian Journal of Research. 25c (2): 73–94. doi:10.1139/cjr47c-008.
- Newton, Margaret; Peturson, Bjorn; Whiteside, A.G.O (1948). "Further studies on the effect of leaf rust on the yield, grade, and quality of wheat". Canadian Journal of Research. 26c (1): 65–70. doi:10.1139/cjr48c-007.

== See also ==
- Timeline of women in science
