= Vera Charles =

American mycologist (1877-1854)

Vera K. Charles
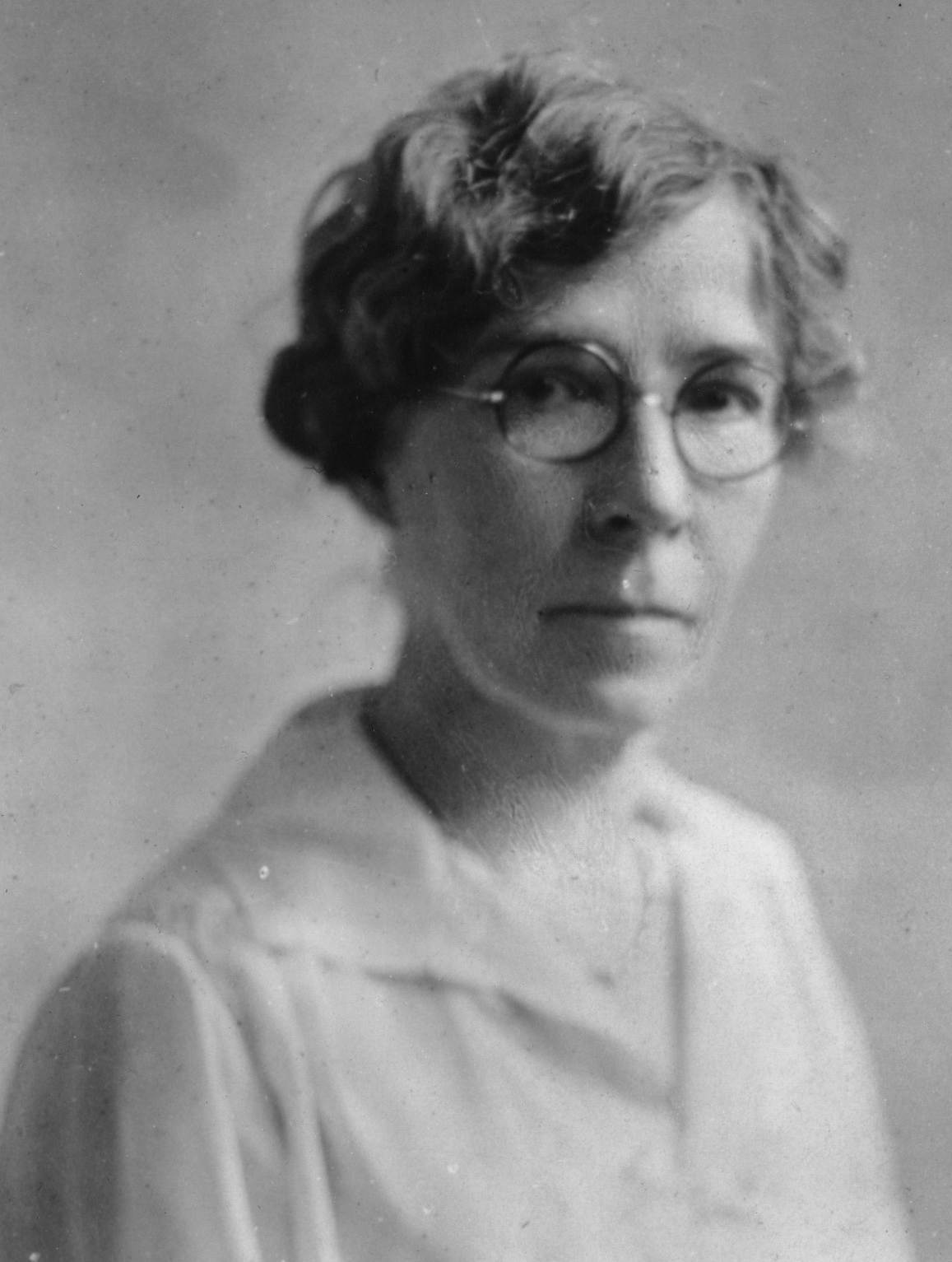
- Born: 24 June 1877; Erie, Pennsylvania, US
- Died: 2 November 1954 (aged 77); Washington, D. C., US
- Education: Mount Holyoke College and Cornell University
- Scientific career
- Workplaces: United States Department of Agriculture
- Academic advisors: George Francis Atkinson
- Author abbrev. (botany): Charles

Vera Katherine Charles (1877–1954) was an American mycologist. She was one of the first women to be appointed to professional positions within the U.S. Department of Agriculture. Charles coauthored several articles on mushrooms while working for the USDA.

== Education ==
Charles graduated from Mount Holyoke College, and received her PhD from Cornell University College of Agriculture and Life Sciences in 1903. While in school, she primarily studied mycology, but also focused on plant pathology. After graduation, she began to work for the USDA, where she worked for many years in the Office of Mycological Collections and its successors.

== Career and research ==
During her early career as a mycologist, Charles often worked with Flora Wambaugh Patterson, the first female mycologist in the USDA. During the 1910s and 1920s, they published many coauthored papers. These papers were held in high regard by Charles' and Patterson's contemporaries. This partnership continued until Patterson's death in 1928.

Charles was responsible for inspecting many imported plants prior to the Plant Quarantine Act, enacted in 1912. Through inspecting these plants for signs of disease, Charles and her lab were the first to report and categorize potato wart disease. Charles and Patterson became primarily responsible for fungus research with the Pathological Collections after the organization of Plant Disease Survey in 1917. Charles also conducted research and publish articles on the fungal pathogens that North American insects face. Her knowledge of agarics, specifically the identification of edible and poisonous fungi, meant that for many years she was the government expert. Her Some common mushrooms and how to know them published in 1931 and twice revised was still among the most frequently requested publications from the US Department of Agriculture in the mid-1950s.

In 1931 she published Introduction to Mushroom Hunting. In addition, she contributed a chapter to a 1935 book on careers for women. Her chapter was entitled "The Mycologist." Even after retiring on 30 June 1942, Charles collaborated with other mycologists. However, eventually Charles' eyesight weakened to the point that she could no longer use a microscope but she continued writing. During her career she was author or co-author of over 37 books and scientific papers, as well as assisting other mycologists with descriptions of new species.

== Selected publications ==
- Charles VK. "Occurrence of Lasiodiplodia on Theobroma cacao and Mangifera indica". The Journal of Mycology, Vol. 12, No. 4 (1906), pp. 145–146
- Charles VK. "A fungus on lace bugs" Mycologia, Vol. 29, No. 2 (1937), pp. 216–221
- Charles VK. "An entomogenous fungus on spider mites on water Hyacinth" Mycologia, Vol. 32, No. 4 (1940), pp. 537–540
- Charles VK. "A fungous disease of codling moth larvae" Mycologia, Vol. 33, No. 4 (1941), pp. 344–349
- Charles VK. "Mushroom poisoning caused by Lactaria glaucescens" Mycologia, Vol. 34, No. 1 (1942), pp. 112–113
- Charles VK. "Some common mushrooms and how to know them. United States Department of Agriculture, no. 143 Washington, D.C. (1946) doi:10.5962/bhl.title.27597
