= Cashiella =

Scientific classification
- Kingdom: Fungi
- Division: Ascomycota
- Class: Leotiomycetes
- Order: Helotiales
- Family: Dermateaceae
- Genus: Cashiella; Petr. (1951)

Type species
- Cashiella atra Petr. (1951)

Species
- C. atra C. fuscidula C. montiicola C. sticheri

Genus of fungi

Cashiella is a genus of fungi in the family Dermateaceae. The genus contains four species. Cashiella, circumscribed in 1951 by Franz Petrak, is named in honor of American mycologist Edith Katherine Cash.

== See also ==
- List of Dermateaceae genera
