= Helen Hart (plant pathologist) =

American academic (1900–1971)

- Born: September 2, 1900; Janesville, Wisconsin
- Died: May 2, 1971 (aged 70); Grants Pass, Oregon
- Citizenship: American
- Education: University of Minnesota
- Known for: President of the American Phytopathological Society
- Scientific career
- Thesis: Morphological and Physiological Studies on Stem Rust Resistance in Wheat
- Doctoral advisor: Elvin C. Stakman

Helen Hart (September 2, 1900 – May 2, 1971) was an American plant pathologist, and Professor Emeritus at the University of Minnesota. Hart was the first woman president of the American Phytopathological Society, and was instrumental in making the University of Minnesota's Department of Plant Pathology a world-leader in stem rust.

== Early life and education ==
Hart was born in Janesville, Wisconsin to Alice Hart (née Echlin) of Janesville and Richard Johnson Hart, a dentist from York, England. She attended Janesville’s public schools and graduated from high school in June 1918. She enrolled in Lawrence College in the fall of 1918, then transferred in 1920 to the University of Minnesota where she resided for most of her professional career. She earned a Bachelor of Arts in botany in the spring of 1922.

== Career ==
In the summer of 1922, after facing initial discouragement from Elvin C. Stakman, chair of the Department of Plant Pathology, Hart began to work towards her master's degree as a laboratory assistant at the university farm. Hart focused her master's research on flax rust, specifically the environmental influences on the life cycle of the fungus that causes it. She earned her master's degree from the University of Minnesota in 1924, after which she began work as a part-time instructor in the Department of Plant Pathology. For the next four years, Hart performed research focused on how the structure of wheat plant tissues relates to the morphology of the stem rust pathogen.

Hunt successfully presented her doctoral dissertation, titled "Morphological and Physiological Studies on Stem Rust Resistance in Wheat" in 1929 and was awarded her Ph.D. In 1931, her dissertation was published in the U.S.D.A. Technical Bulletin. In 1933, Helen Hart became a full-time instructor. She became a full-time professor in 1947 and Professor Emeritus in 1966. In 1955, Hart became the first woman president of the American Phytopathological Society. She was also elected as the first woman Fellow of the American Phytopathological Society in 1965.

She died in 1971 at Grants Pass, Oregon.
