= Millersburg, Missouri =

Unincorporated community in Missouri, U.S.

Coordinates: 38°53′55″N 92°07′25″W

Millersburg is an unincorporated community in Callaway County, in the U.S. state of Missouri. It is located near the Boone-Callaway county line on the Owl Creek tributary of Cedar Creek. The Little Dixie Lake and Little Dixie Wildlife Management Area lie on Owl Creek just north of the community. It is on Missouri Route J about four miles south of I-70.

== History ==
Millersburg is one of the oldest settlements in Callaway County to be established after Missouri statehood in 1821, and was located along the southernmost historic "Boone's Lick" trail route of about 1826. Millersburg was platted in 1829. The community derives its name from Thomas Miller, a pioneer settler from Kentucky. A local post office called Millersburg was established in 1830, and remained in operation until 1953.

== Notable person ==
- Beverly Thomas Galloway, educator, was born in Millersburg.
