= Edward Monroe Freeman =

American botanist (1875–1954)

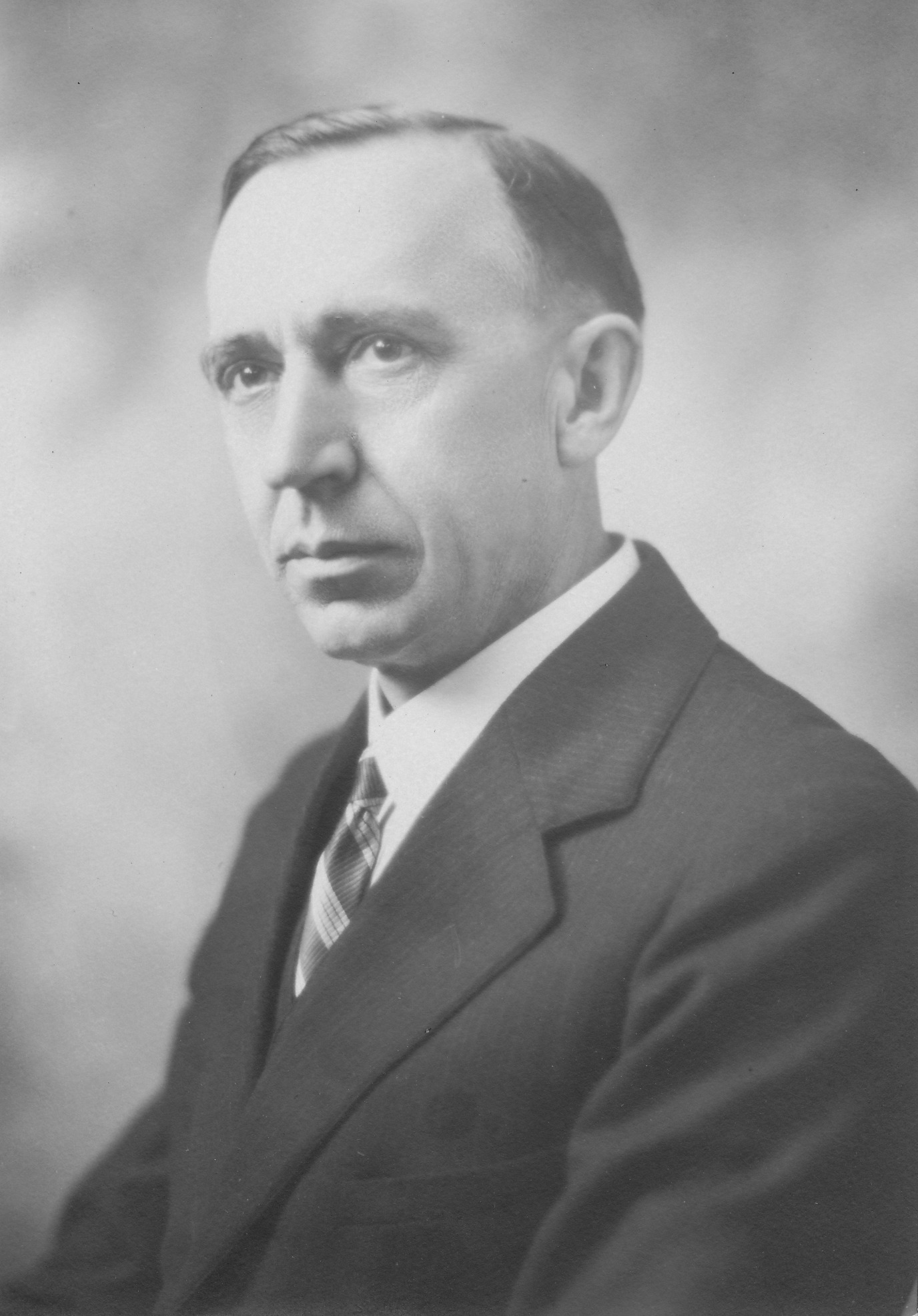
- Born: February 12, 1875; Saint Paul, Minnesota
- Died: February 5, 1954 (aged 78)
- Scientific career
- Fields: Phytopathology
- Academic advisors: Conway MacMillan, Harry Marshall Ward
- Notable students: Elvin C. Stakman

Edward Monroe Freeman (February 12, 1875 – February 5, 1954) was an American botanist.

== Early life and education ==
Born at St. Paul to Swiss parents, Freeman went to public schools and graduated from Central High School 1892. He enrolled at the University of Minnesota's College of Science, Literature, and the Arts.

Freeman was persuaded by professor of botany Conway MacMillan to become a botanist. He graduated with a B.Sc. in 1898, and became a lecturer and did graduate work there, obtaining his M.Sc. in 1899.

The next year Freeman decided to become a plant pathologist while he was at Wood's Hole in Massachusetts for the summer.

He arranged to go the next year to study at Cambridge University under Harry Marshall Ward, and thus began one of Freeman's most notable accomplishments: Introducing European knowledge of plant pathology and methods to American education and practice. Ward and Freeman worked together for only the next year; they entered controversies and resolved them with relative ease, and by the end of the year had settled several famous questions of seed pathology and rust taxonomy. It was one of these - details of seeds residency in a Lolium temulentum-Puccinia rust pathosystem - that also became Freeman's PhD in a few years.

== Career ==
In 1902 he returned to the University of Minnesota as a lecturer, and then assistant professor of botany and plant pathology in 1908. In 1907 the university asked him to found an entirely new department, and the Division of Plant Pathology and Botany in the Agriculture Department was founded, with Freeman in charge. In 1909, a local high school teacher named Elvin Stakman became only the third lecturer in the Division, and its first graduate student.

Eventually, Freeman became dean of the College in 1917. One of his best known works of this time is Minnesota Plant Diseases. He retired in 1943, and died at his home nearby 11 years later on February 5, 1954.

== Bibliography ==
- Freeman, E. M. (1902). "Experiments on the Brown Rust of Bromes (Puccinia dispersa)". Annals of Botany. 16 (63). Oxford University Press: 487–494. doi:10.1093/oxfordjournals.aob.a088885. eISSN 1095-8290. ISSN 0305-7364. JSTOR 43235186. OCLC 1167493298.
- Freeman, Edward Monroe (1904). "I.—The seed-fungus of Lolium temulentum, L., the darnel". Philosophical Transactions of the Royal Society of London. Series B, Containing Papers of a Biological Character. 196 (214–224). The Royal Society: 1–27. doi:10.1098/rstb.1904.0001. ISSN 0264-3960.
- Freeman, Edward Monroe (1905). Minnesota Plant Diseases. Botanical Series V. Saint Paul, Minnesota. pp. xxiii+432. ISBN 978-1376700329. 8 volumes. 211 figures.

- "Freeman's Minnesota Plant Diseases.-Report of the Survey, Botanical Series. E. M. Freeman". The American Naturalist. 40 (474). University of Chicago Press: 463. 1906. doi:10.1086/278639. ISSN 0003-0147.
- Hasselbring, H. (1906). "Minnesota Plant Diseases. E. M. Freeman". Botanical Gazette. 41 (1). University of Chicago Press: 72–73. doi:10.1086/328712. ISSN 0006-8071.

- Edward Monroe Freeman; Johnson, E. C. "The rusts of grain in the United States". United States Department of Agriculture Bulletin 1911 No.216. CABD 20057001278.
