= Fruit ketchup =

Condiment made from fruit

Fruit ketchup is a condiment prepared using fruit as a primary ingredient. Various fruits are used in its preparation, and it is also used as a spread and marinade, among other uses. Banana ketchup is a type of fruit ketchup that is common in the Philippines.

== Overview ==
Fruit ketchup is composed primarily of fruit such as apples, pears, peaches, currants, grapes, cranberries, cherries and plums, among others. Tropical fruits used in its preparation can include mangoes, guavas, banana, pineapple, papayas and others. Sometimes several fruits are used to create a mixed-fruit ketchup. Chili peppers can be used to prepare a spicy fruit ketchup. Vinegar, ginger and sugar or brown sugar are sometimes used in its preparation.

Fruit ketchup is used as a condiment in the same manner as the more common tomato ketchup. It is also used as a spread, dipping sauce, marinade, topping and base for salad dressings. It can be used to top beef and pork and various savory dishes such as meatloaf. It is also used as a sandwich spread.

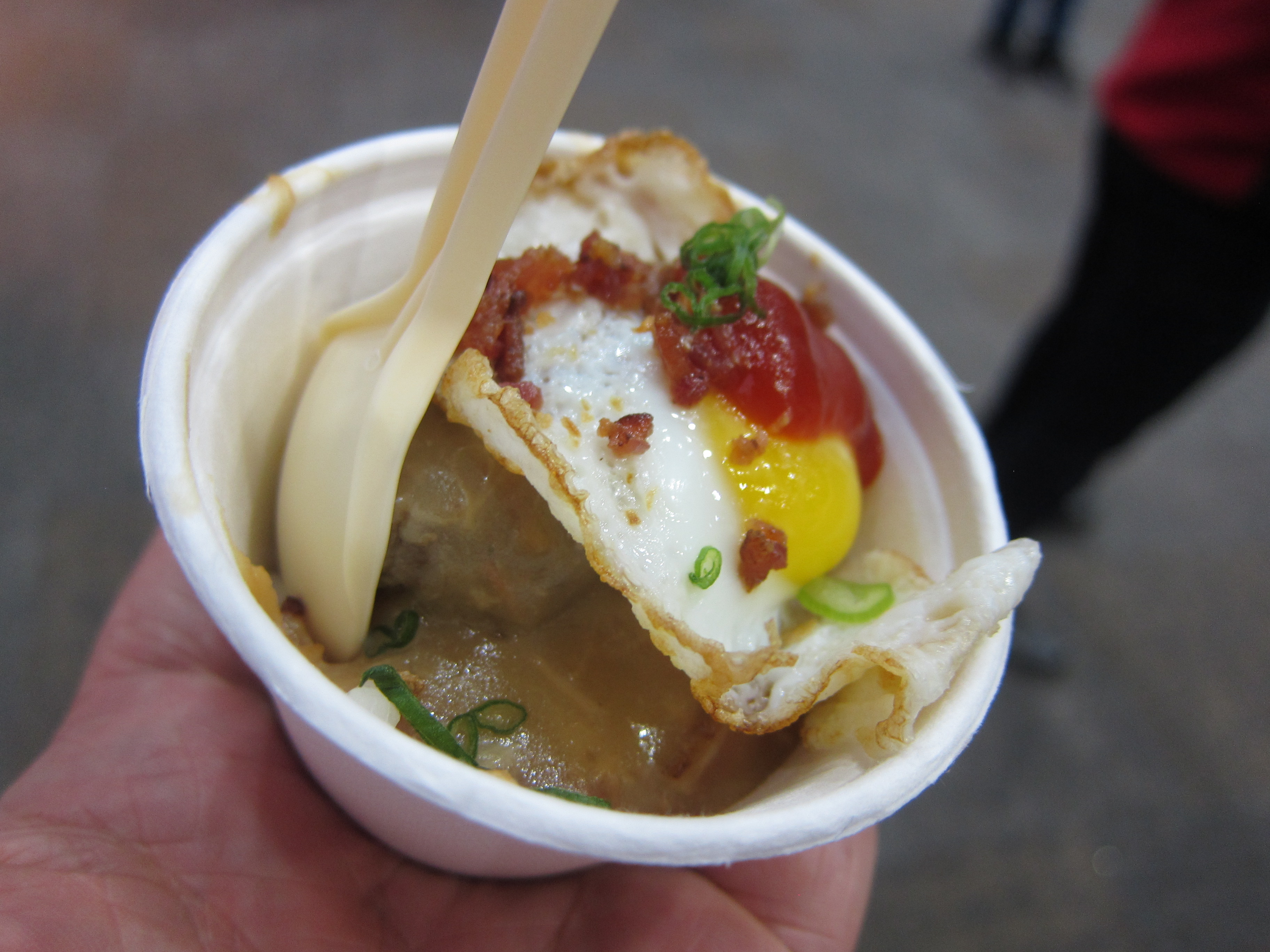
Loco moco with spicy banana ketchup atop the egg

Banana ketchup, sometimes referred to as banana sauce, is a sweet ketchup prepared using mashed banana, sugar, vinegar and spices. It is a common condiment in the Philippines, where it is as common as tomato ketchup is in the United States. Banana ketchup is mass-produced by some companies and marketed under various brands, such as Jufran.

== Companies ==
NutriAsia is a company based in Manila, Philippines, that manufactures the Jufran brand of banana ketchup.

== See also ==
- List of condiments
- Banana ketchup
- Tomato jam
