= Banana ketchup =

Sauce made from bananas

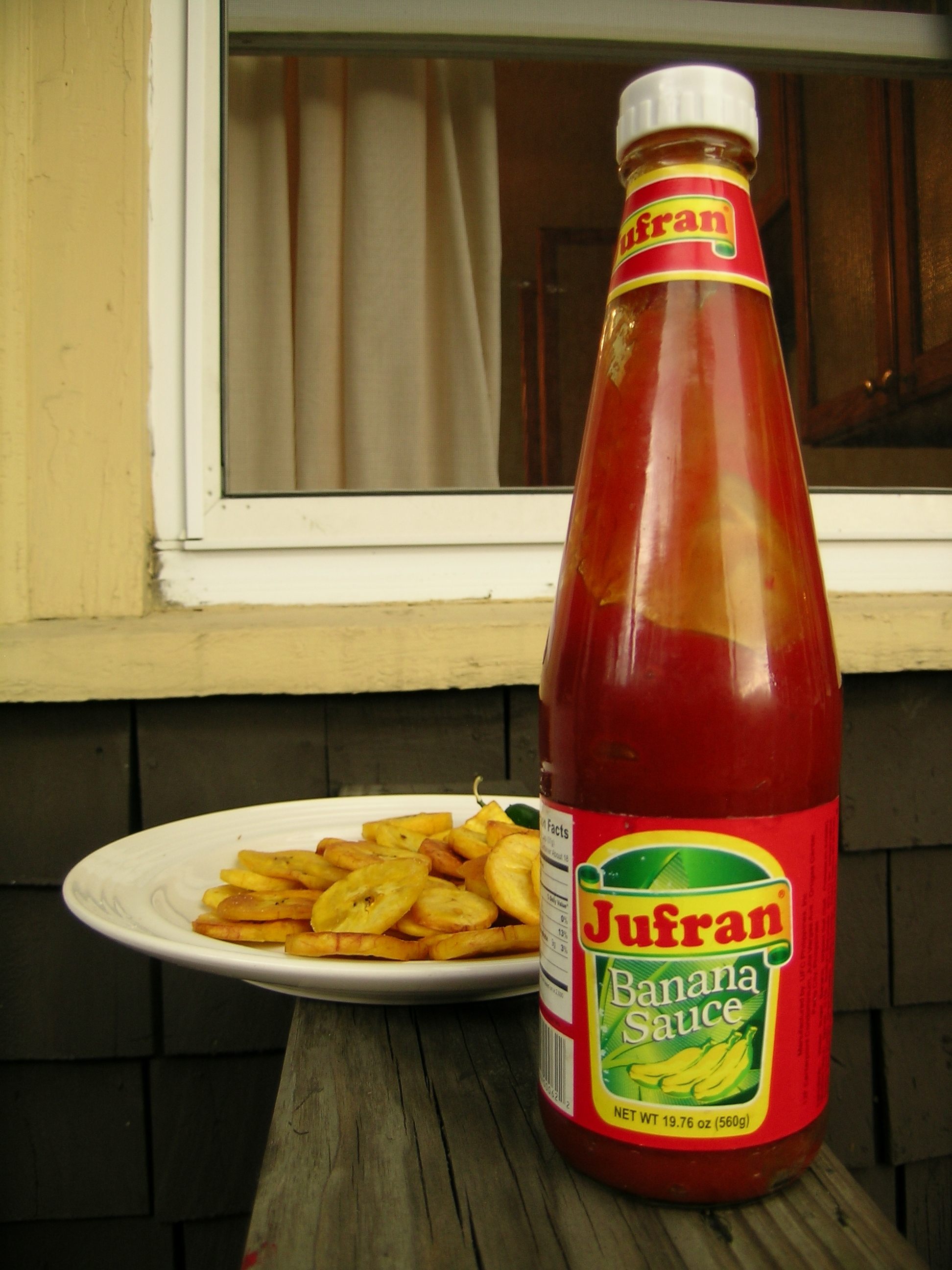
- Banana ketchup from Pasig, Philippines, with plantain tostones
- Alternative names: Banana sauce
- Type: Condiment
- Place of origin: Philippines
- Associated cuisine: Philippines
- Created by: Maria Y. Orosa
- Main ingredients: Banana

Banana ketchup, also known as banana sauce (in export markets), is a Philippine fruit ketchup condiment made from banana, sugar, vinegar, and spices. Its natural color is brownish-yellow but it is often dyed red to resemble tomato ketchup. Banana ketchup was first produced in the Philippines during World War II due to a shortage of tomatoes but a comparatively high production of bananas.

== Use ==
In Filipino households, this condiment is used on many dishes: Filipino spaghetti, omelettes (torta), hot dogs, hamburgers, french fries, fish, charcoal-grilled pork barbecue, Filipino barbecue, fried chicken, and other meats.

== History ==
Filipina food technologist Maria Y. Orosa (1892–1945) is credited with inventing the product.

In 1942, banana ketchup was first mass-produced commercially by Magdalo V. Francisco Sr. who founded the brand name Mafran (a portmanteau of his given name and surname).

== See also ==
- Liver spread
- List of banana dishes
- List of condiments
- List of sauces
- Mushroom ketchup
- UFC (food brand)
