= James Robert Weir =

- Born: 1882; Scottsberg, Indiana
- Died: 1943 (aged 60–61)
- Education: Purdue University; Ludwig-Maximilians-Universität München
- Scientific career
- Workplaces: USDA; Ford
- Thesis: Untersuchungen über die Gattung Coprinus (1911)
- Author abbrev. (botany): Weir

James Robert Weir (1882–1943) was an American mycologist specializing in wood decaying fungi and forest pathology. He advised Henry Ford on rubber plantations and was head of The U.S. National Fungus Collections.
