= William Webster Diehl =

American mycologist

William Webster Diehl (January 15, 1891 – 1978) was an American mycologist recognized for his work on grass pathogens, particularly in the genus Balansia.

Diehl was born in on January 15, 1891 in Logansport, Indiana to parents Edwin Randall Diehl and Mary Delilah Wyrick Diehl. The family moved to Ohio shortly after his birth and he attended grammar school in Dayton. He attended Miami University from 1910–1914 and received an MSc in botany from Iowa State College in 1915. He was briefly an instructor of botany and plant pathology with Clemson before joining the USDA where he worked from 1928 until his retirement in 1958. Together with Flora Wambaugh Patterson and Edith Katherine Cash he issued the exsiccata-like series Mycological exchange of 1921 with specimens distributed by the USDA.

He was honoured in 1954, when Diehliomyces is a genus of fungi in the Ascomycota phylum, was named after him.

The standard author abbreviation Diehl is used to indicate this person as the author when citing a botanical name.

== See also ==
- List of mycologists
