= Elvin Stakman =

American mycologist (1885–1979)

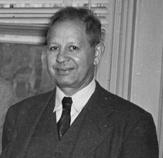
- 1947 at the AAAS
- Born: Elvin Charles Stakman; May 17, 1885; Kewaunee County, Wisconsin, U.S.
- Died: January 22, 1979 (aged 93); Saint Paul, Minnesota, U.S.
- Scientific career
- Fields: Phytopathology
- Academic advisors: Edward Monroe Freeman
- Doctoral students: Margaret Newton, Helen Hart
- Other notable students: Norman Borlaug

Elvin Charles Stakman (May 17, 1885 – January 22, 1979) was an American plant pathologist who was a pioneer of methods of identifying and combatting disease in wheat. He became an internationally renowned phytopathologist for his studies of the genetics and epidemiology of stem rust. Stakman is credited with improving crop yields both in North America and worldwide as part of the Green Revolution.

== Career ==
Elvin Charles Stakman was born on May 17, 1885, near Ahnapee (later Algoma, Wisconsin) to Frederick and Emelie Eberhardt Stakman. Soon after the family moved to Brownton, Minnesota. He took more advanced high school classes in St. Paul and Glencoe before attending the University of Minnesota.

After earning his B.A. degree in German, botany and political science, Stakman taught school for a couple of years, before joining the plant pathology department at the University of Minnesota as an assistant professor. He received an M.A. degree in 1910 and a Ph.D. in 1913. Soon after he was appointed head of the Section of Plant Pathology. In 1940, he was promoted to head of the full Department of Plant Pathology, where he remained until retiring in 1953.

Stakman was elected to the American Academy of Arts and Sciences in 1923, the United States National Academy of Sciences in 1934, and the American Philosophical Society in 1940.

Beginning in 1918, Stakman organized a campaign to eradicate barberries, an alternate host of black stem rust fungus that affected about 1/3 of the United States. He gaining support from the U.S. Department of Agriculture, state governments, business, and banking. Stakman led the program for its first year, successfully eliminating rust epidemics. Beginning in the 1940s, he worked with the Mexican Government and the Rockefeller Foundation on a cooperative program in agricultural research that became a model for establishing a network of research centers in developing countries worldwide.

== Research ==
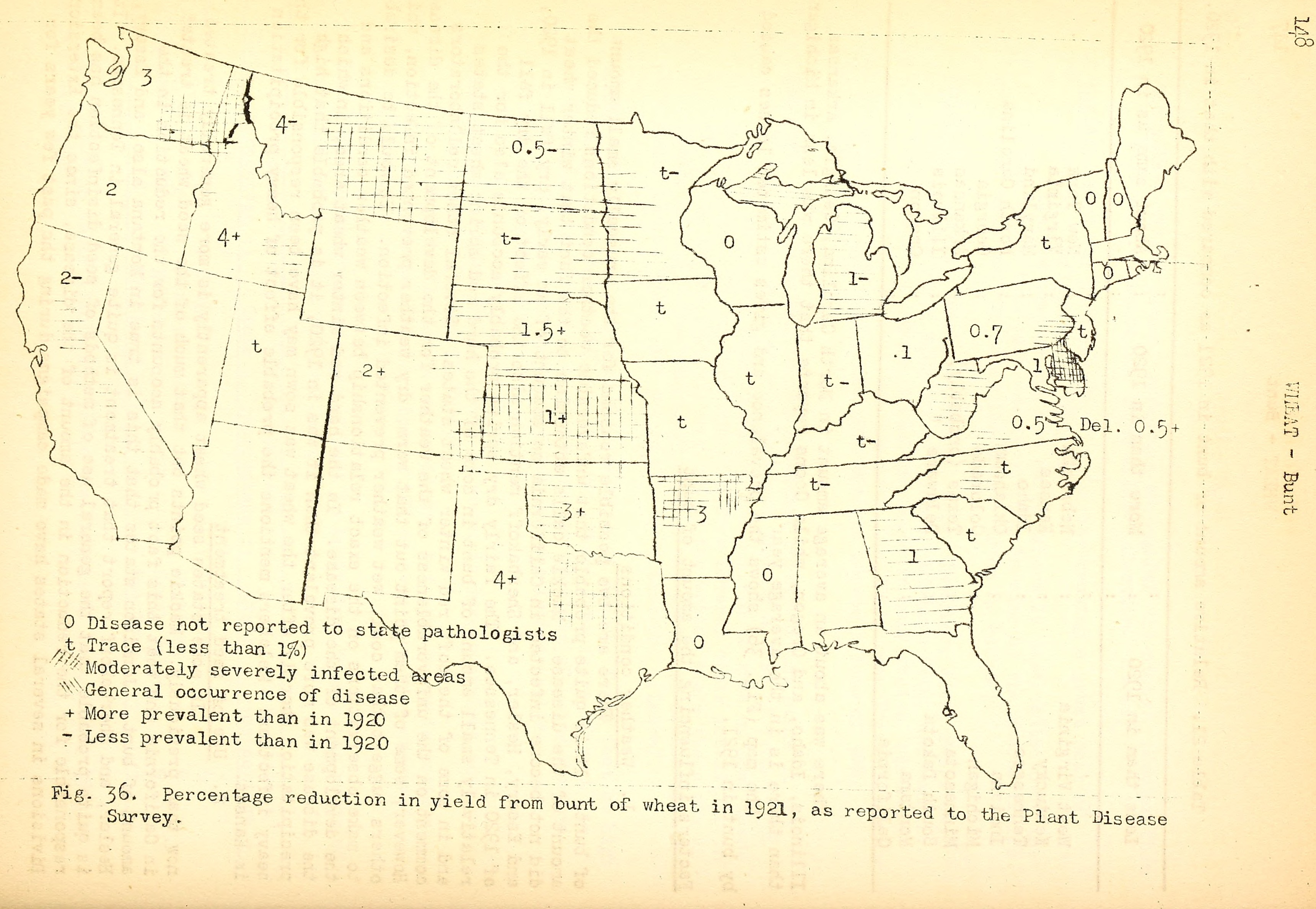
Map from Stakman's 1922 US Plant Disease Survey

Through work that he began as part of his Ph.D. on black stem rust (Puccinia graminis), Stakman disproved the prevalent theory of "bridging hosts", the belief that the fungus could develop new parasitic capabilities to spread from rye to barley to (previously immune) wheat. His work on wheat led to the development of more widely applicable principles.

In 1917, Stakman and Piemeisel were the first to determine that varieties of Puccinia graminis f. sp. tritici could be categorized into different physiological strains or races, affecting different varieties of host plants. In 1937, Stakman crossed P. graminis tritici and P. graminis secalis and determined that while most hybrids resembled the tritici parent, some were intermediate between rye and wheat forms. The discover that rusts were evolving new strains that could infect plants resistant to previous strains of rust led to a counter-strategy, breeding and deploying new varieties of rust‐resistant wheat before new strains of wheat rust could spread. In 1940, Stakman and coworkers established that spores travel long distances and are carried by wind. They showed that urediospores of P. graminis tritici were carried from as far away as Mexico and Texas to Canada and North Dakota, over 2000 miles, affecting early-sown wheat.

== Influences ==
Stakman was the advisor for Margaret Newton, who completed her Doctor of Philosophy (Ph.D.) studies in 1922. She became the first Canadian woman to obtain a degree in agricultural science.

Stakman married the plant pathologist Estelle Louise Jensen in 1917.

Stakman also had a major hand in influencing Norman Borlaug to pursue a career in phytopathology. In 1938, in a speech entitled "These Shifty Little Enemies that Destroy our Food Crops", Stakman discussed the manifestation of the plant disease rust, a parasitic fungus that feeds on phytonutrients, in wheat, oat and barley crops across the US. He had discovered that special plant breeding methods created plants resistant to rust. His research greatly interested Borlaug, who subsequently re-enrolled to the University of Minnesota to study plant pathology under Stakman. Borlaug went on to discover varieties of dwarf wheat that helped reduce famine in India, Pakistan, and other countries, and received the Nobel Peace Prize for his work in 1970.

== Death and legacy ==
Stakman died in 1979 of a stroke, aged 93, in St. Paul, Minnesota.

In Stakman's honor, Stakman Hall was named for him on the University of Minnesota's St. Paul campus, providing space for Plant Pathology and related fields.
