= Beverly Thomas Galloway =

American plant pathologist and horticulturist

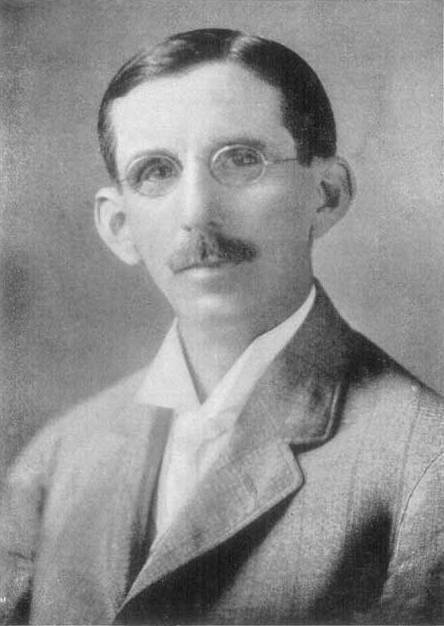
- Born: October 16, 1863; Millersburg, Missouri
- Died: June 13, 1938 (aged 74); Washington, D.C.
- Education: University of Missouri
- Scientific career
- Fields: Plant pathology, horticulture
- Workplaces: United States Department of Agriculture

Beverly Thomas Galloway (October 16, 1863 – June 13, 1938) was an American plant pathologist and horticulturist who was the first head of the Division of Vegetable Physiology and Pathology of the United States Department of Agriculture (USDA). He served for one year as Assistant Secretary of Agriculture of the United States, and has been described as "arguably the single, most influential figure involved in the early growth and development of plant pathology and the plant sciences generally in the USDA." He served as president of the Botanical Society of America, was a charter member of the American Phytopathological Society, and was a fellow of the American Association for the Advancement of Science.

== Early life and education ==
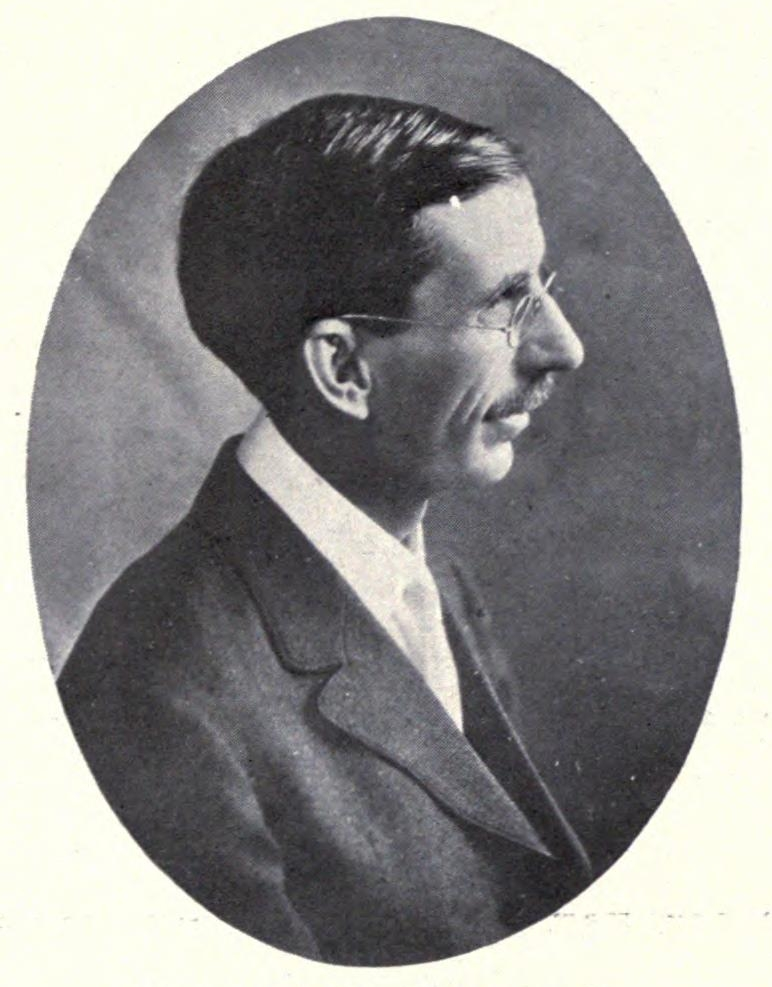
c. 1918

Galloway was born October 16, 1863, in Millersburg, Missouri, the fourth child and only son of parents Robert McCauley Galloway and Jane Galloway (née McCray). His father was a Kentucky-born farmer and miler of Scotch-Irish descent, and his mother's family came from Maryland. At age 14 Beverly became a clerk in a Columbia, Missouri, drugstore and in 1878 became a registered pharmacist, practicing for two years. He entered the University of Missouri in 1882, where he was mentored by botanist Samuel M. Tracy, and graduated with a Bachelor of Agricultural Science degree in 1884. He worked in the university's horticulture department for two years after graduation, where he developed an interest in plant diseases. His 1887 paper Parasitic fungi of Missouri was the first systematic and economic mycological work conducted in the state.

== Career ==
In 1887 Galloway was appointed as assistant in the Section of Mycology of the United States Department of Agriculture, becoming head of the Section the following year after the resignation of Frank Lamson-Scribner. As chief, Galloway expanded the research scope of the Section to include the chemical control of fungal diseases of a larger selection of crops, and made the Section more responsive to the needs of farmers and gardeners. In 1895 the Section of Mycology was renamed the Division of Vegetable Physiology and Pathology, with Galloway remaining chief.

In 1913, he was appointed Assistant Secretary of Agriculture of the United States, serving for one year before accepting a deanship at New York State College of Agriculture, a college of Cornell University. He left Cornell in 1916 and returned to the USDA, where he served until his retirement in 1933.

Over his career, Galloway served as president of the Botanical Society of America (1902), was a charter member of the American Phytopathological Society, and was elected a fellow of the American Association for the Advancement of Science. He received honorary doctorates from the University of Missouri (1902) and the University of Maryland (1923). He was elected as member of the Royal Swedish Academy of Agriculture in 1899.

== Personal life and death ==
Galloway married Agnes Stewart Rankin of Kansas City, Missouri, in 1888, with whom he had three children: Robert Rankin, Alexander Gordon, and Beverly Stewart. After being stricken with blindness and an incurable disease, Galloway committed suicide on June 13, 1938, in Washington, D.C., and was buried in Washington's Fort Lincoln Cemetery.
