= Mushroom ketchup =

Style of ketchup

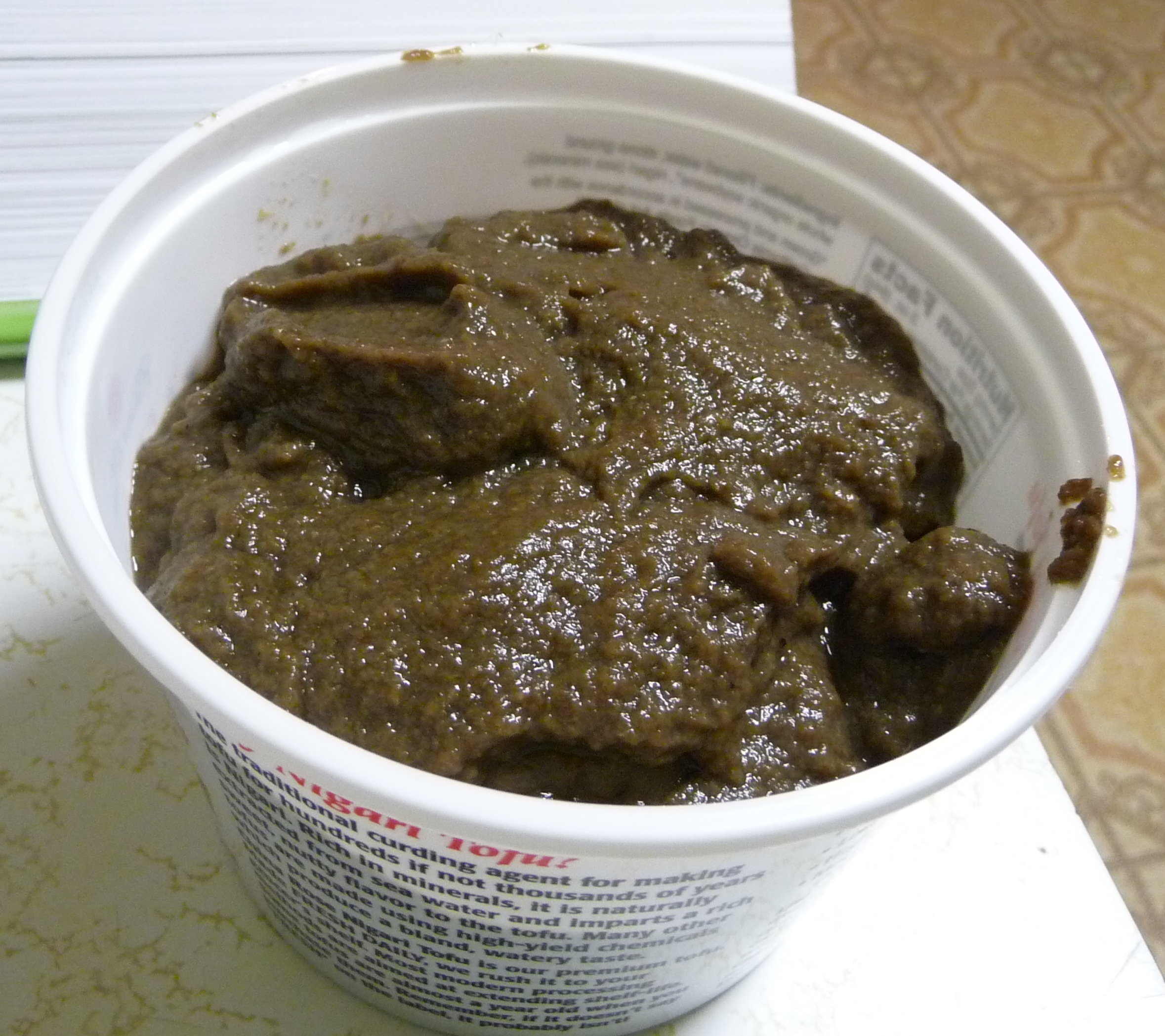
Homemade mushroom ketchup in a plastic tub

Mushroom ketchup is a style of ketchup that is prepared with mushrooms as its primary ingredient. Originally, ketchup in the British Isles was prepared with mushrooms as a primary ingredient, instead of tomato, the main ingredient in most modern preparations of ketchup. Historical preparations involved packing whole mushrooms into containers with salt. It is used as a condiment and may be used as an ingredient in the preparation of other sauces and other condiments. Several brands of mushroom ketchup were produced and marketed in the United Kingdom, some of which were exported to the United States, and some are still manufactured as a commercial product.

== History ==
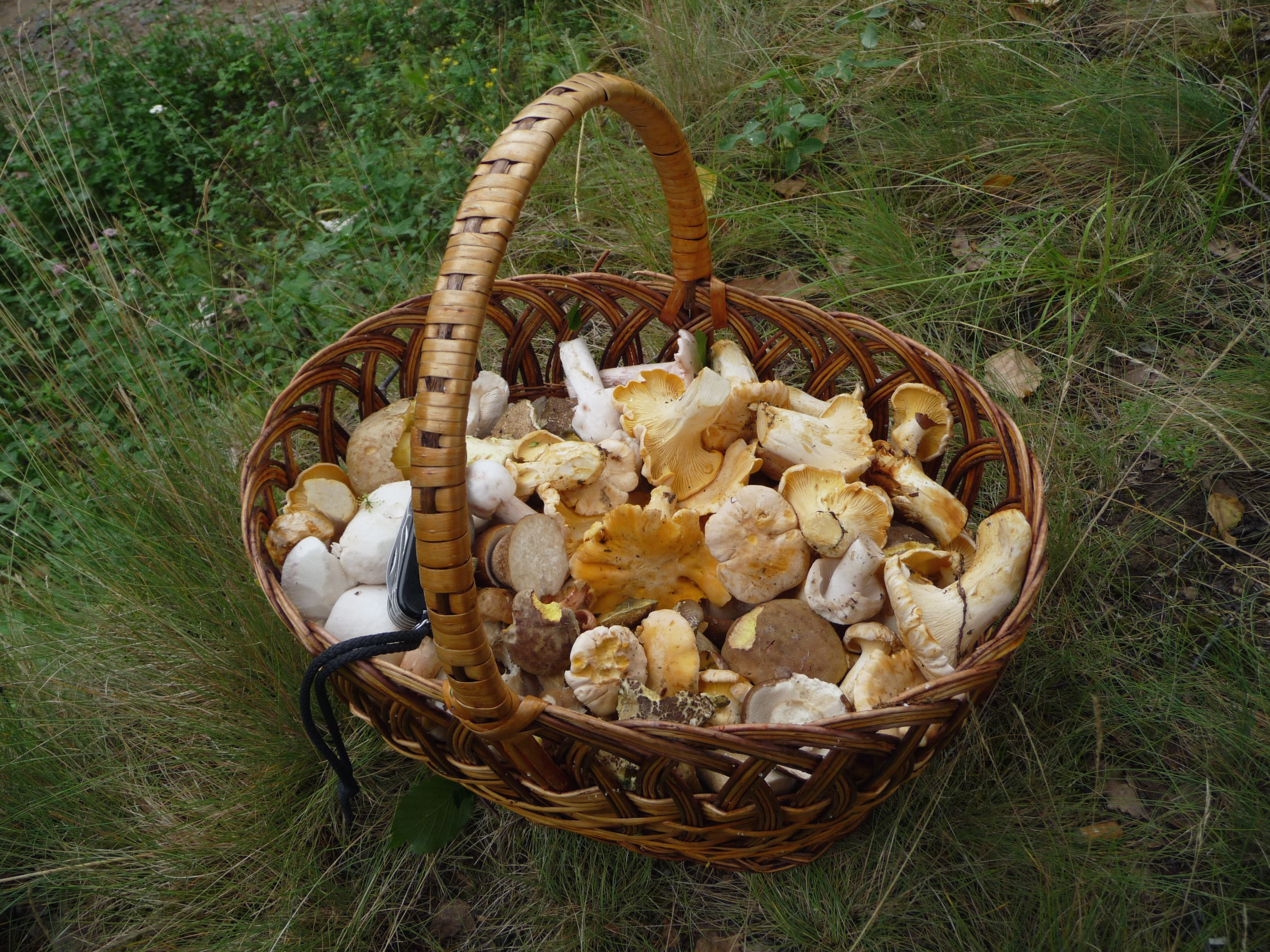
Mushrooms are a primary ingredient in mushroom ketchup.

In the United Kingdom, ketchup was historically made with mushrooms as a primary ingredient. The outcome was sometimes referred to as "mushroom ketchup". Currently, ketchup's primary ingredient is typically tomato. Mushroom ketchup appears to have originated in Great Britain. In the United States, mushroom ketchup dates back to at least 1770 in English-speaking colonies in North America. A manuscript cookbook from Charleston, South Carolina, that was written in 1770 by Harriott Pinckney Horry documented a mushroom ketchup that used two egg whites to clarify the mixture. This manuscript also contained a recipe for walnut ketchup. Richard Briggs's The English Art of Cookery, first published in 1788, has recipes for both mushroom ketchup and walnut ketchup.

=== Ingredients and preparation ===
The preparation of mushroom ketchup involved packing whole mushrooms into containers with salt, allowing time for the liquid from the mushrooms to fill the container, and then cooking them to a boiling point in an oven. They were finished with spices, such as mace, nutmeg and black pepper, and then the liquid was separated from solid matter by straining. Several species of edible mushrooms were used in its preparation, and some versions used vinegar as an ingredient. The final product had a dark color that was derived from the spores that transferred from the mushrooms to the solution. The version in The English Art of Cookery calls for "mushrooms gathered dry" to be used for the ketchup's preparation. This version also uses red wine in the ketchup's preparation, and uses a cooking reduction, in which the product is reduced to one-third, after which the final product is bottled.

The book British Edible Fungi, published in 1891, states that for optimal results, "mixed fungi should not be used, beyond certain limits..." Per this source, some species of mushrooms may be mixed together in mushroom ketchup's preparation, but certain species should not be mixed together, and some should not be mixed with others at all. This book also includes a preparation for "double ketchup" that involves reducing mushroom ketchup to half its original volume, which doubles its strength through the evaporation of water.

In some instances in the late 19th century in the United States, ketchup sold in towns and labeled as "mushroom ketchup" did not actually contain mushrooms. These products have been described as "easy to detect", and as distinguishable by the use of a microscope.

=== Use in foods ===
In the 19th century, some sauces were prepared using mushroom ketchup, such as "quin sauce". Quin sauce may be prepared by adding mushroom ketchup or walnut ketchup and anchovies to a prepared essence d'assortiment sauce, which is prepared using white wine, vinegar, lemon juice, dried mushrooms, garlic, shallot, cloves, bay leaves, mace, nutmeg, salt and pepper.

It is also used as an ingredient to flavor Scotch brown soup, a bread soup made with beef, in an early 19th-century recipe from Christian Isobel Johnstone.

==== Use in other condiments ====
An 1857 recipe for "camp ketchup" used mushroom ketchup as an ingredient, in addition to beer, white wine, anchovy, shallot, ginger, mace, nutmeg and black pepper. The recipe combined these ingredients and then called for allowing the mixture to sit for fourteen days, after which it was bottled. Additional 1857 recipes for camp ketchup used ingredients such as mushroom ketchup, vinegar, walnut ketchup, anchovy, soy, garlic, cayenne pods and salt.

== Varieties ==
=== Commercial varieties ===
Several commercial mushroom ketchups were, and still are, produced in the United Kingdom; some of the brands included Crosse and Blackwell's Mushroom Catsup, Morton's Mushroom Ketchup, Jacky's Pantry Mushroom Ketchup and Geo Watkins Mushroom Ketchup. Some of these companies exported their product to the United States, which created competition with ketchup products manufactured in the U.S. by the H. J. Heinz Company.

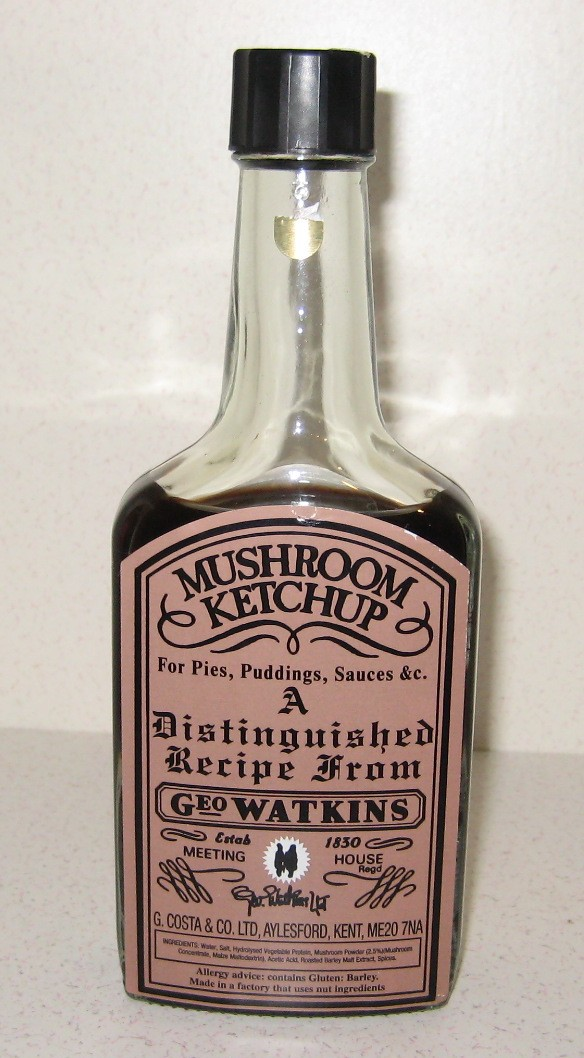
A bottle of Geo Watkins Mushroom Ketchup

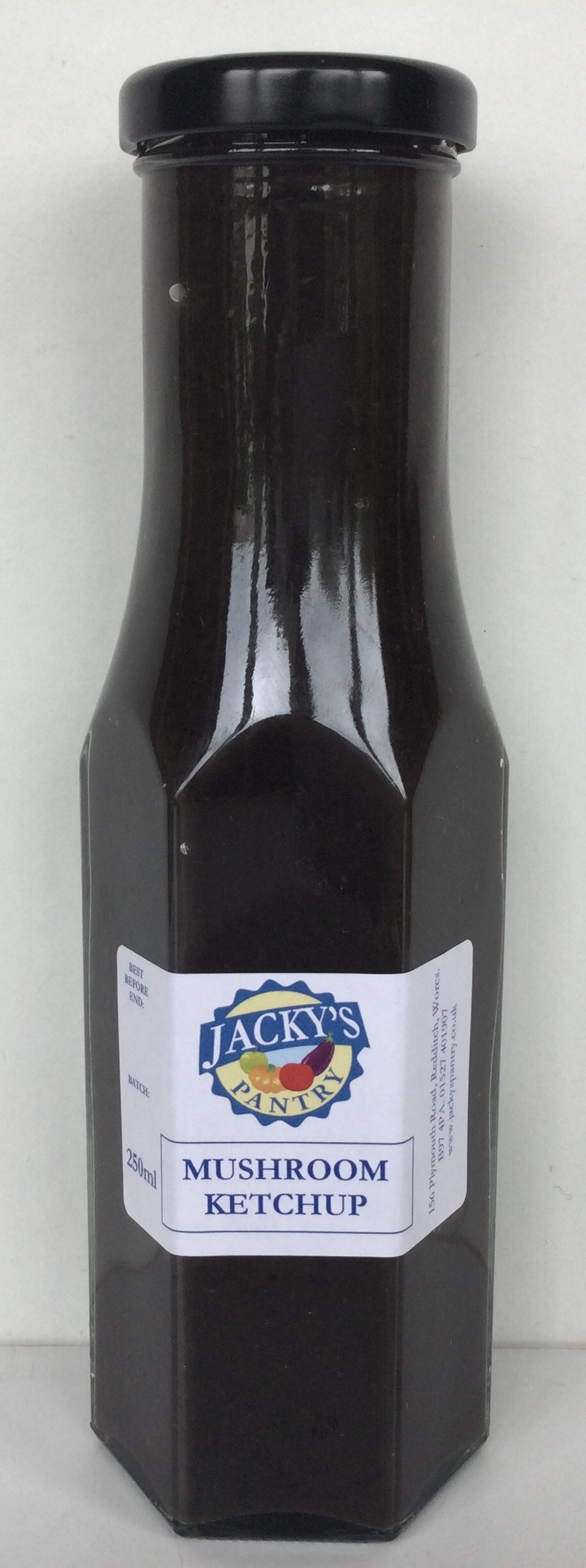
A bottle of Jacky's Pantry Mushroom Ketchup

== See also ==
- Banana ketchup
- List of condiments
- List of mushroom dishes
- List of sauces
- Mushroom sauce

== Bibliography ==
- Jennings, J. (1837). Two thousand five hundred practical Recipes in Family Cookery.
- Smith, Andrew F. (1996). Pure Ketchup. Univ of South Carolina Press. ISBN 1-57003-139-8.
