= Ketchup =

Sauce used as a condiment

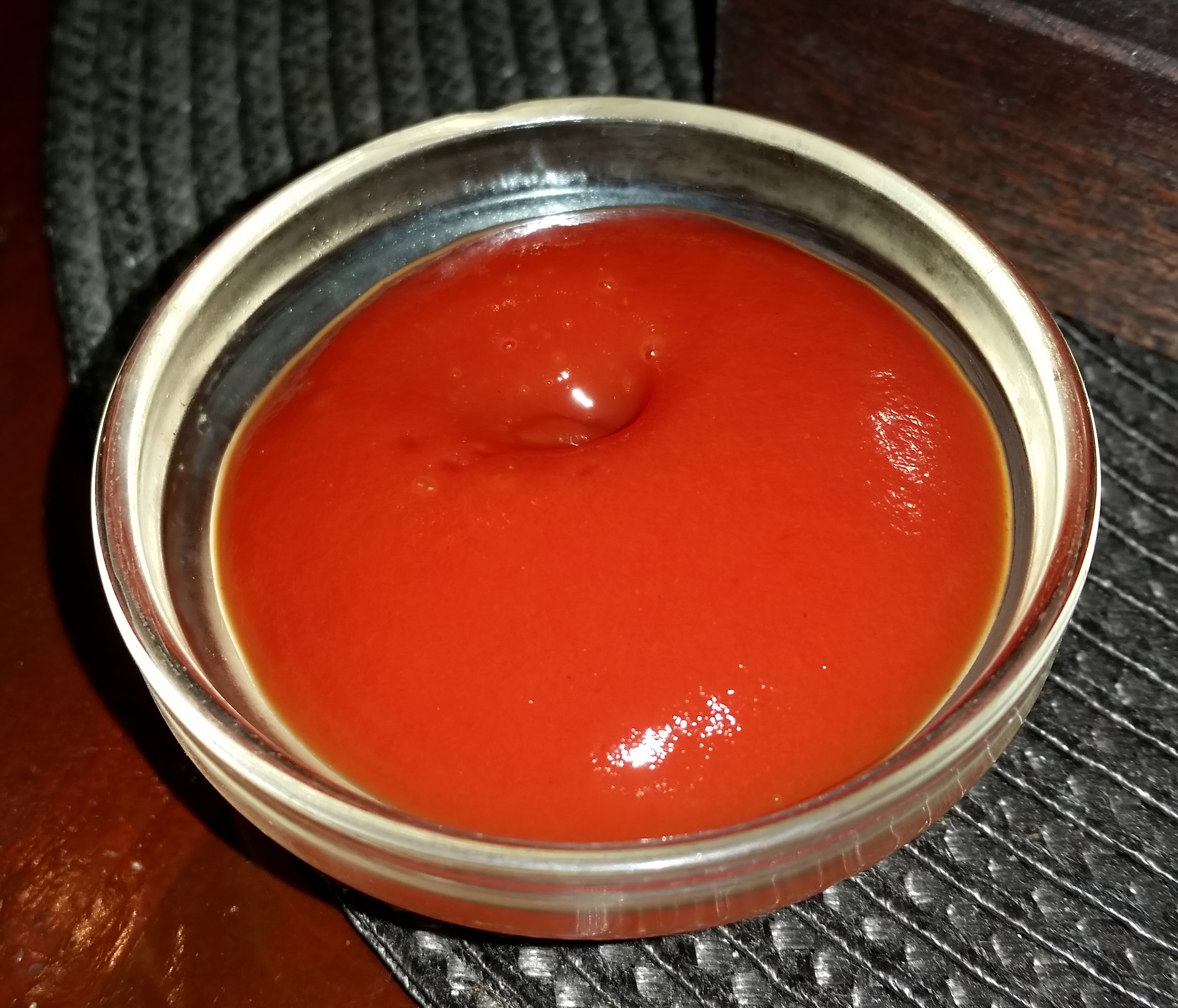
- A glass dish of tomato ketchup
- Type: Condiment
- Place of origin: United Kingdom (mushroom variant), United States (tomato variant)
- Main ingredients: Tomatoes (or other main ingredients), sugar (or high fructose corn syrup), vinegar, salt, spices, and seasonings

Ketchup or catsup (Note: /ˈkɛtʃəp, -ʌp, ˈkætsəp, -ʌp, ˈkætʃəp/) is a table condiment with a sweet and sour flavor.

Ketchup now typically refers to tomato ketchup, although early recipes for different varieties contained mushrooms, oysters, mussels, egg whites, grapes, or walnuts, among other ingredients.

Tomato ketchup is made from tomatoes, sugar, and vinegar, with seasonings and spices. The spices and flavors vary but commonly include onions, allspice, coriander, cloves, cumin, garlic, mustard and sometimes include celery, cinnamon, or ginger. Tomato ketchup is sometimes used as a condiment for dishes that are usually served hot, and are fried or greasy.

Tomato ketchup is sometimes used in other sauces and dressings, such as Thousand Island dressing and Marie Rose sauce, or as a general cooking ingredient. Its flavor may be replicated as an additive flavoring for snacks, such as potato chips.

== Nomenclature ==
=== Terminology ===
The term used for the sauce varies. Ketchup is the dominant term in North America and the UK, though catsup is commonly used in some southern US states and Mexico. The term "tomato sauce" is also used in the UK for something similar.

=== Etymology ===
The etymology of the word ketchup is unclear; there are multiple competing theories:

==== Amoy theory ====
A folk etymology is that the word came from the Amoy (Xiamen) region of China into English, as a borrowed word 茄汁 (ke^{2} zap^{1}, Cantonese, meaning "tomato sauce"; the character 茄 means 'eggplant'; tomato in Chinese is 番茄, so the phrase translates to foreign eggplant sauce).

Another theory is that the word derives from one of two words from Hokkien of the Fujian region of coastal southern China: kôe-chiap (in the Amoy / Xiamen dialect and Quanzhou dialect) or kê-chiap (in the Zhangzhou dialect). Both pronunciations of the same word (膎汁, kôe-chiap / kê-chiap) come from the Quanzhou dialect, Amoy dialect, and Zhangzhou dialect of Hokkien, respectively, where it meant the brine of pickled fish or shellfish (膎, 'pickled food' (usually seafood) + 汁, 'juice'). There are citations of koe-chiap in the Chinese-English Dictionary of the Vernacular or Spoken Language of Amoy (1873) by Carstairs Douglas, defined as "brine of pickled fish or shell-fish".

==== Malay theory ====
Ketchup may have entered the English language from the Malay word kicap (pronounced [kitʃap], sometimes spelled kecap or ketjap). Originally meaning "soy sauce", the word itself derives from Chinese.

In Indonesian cuisine, which is similar to Malay, the term kecap refers to fermented savory sauces. Two main types are well known in their cuisine: kecap asin, which translates to "salty kecap" in Indonesian (a salty soy sauce) and kecap manis or "sweet kecap" in Indonesian. Kecap manis is a sweet soy sauce that is a mixture of soy sauce with brown sugar, molasses, garlic, ginger, anise, coriander and a bay leaf reduced over medium heat until rather syrupy. A third type, kecap ikan, meaning "fish kecap" is fish sauce similar to the Thai nam pla or the Philippine patis. It is not, however, soy-based.

==== European-Arabic theory ====
American anthropologist E. N. Anderson relies on Elizabeth David to claim that ketchup is a cognate of the French escavèche, meaning "food in sauce". The word also exists in Spanish and Portuguese forms as escabeche, "a sauce for pickling", which culinary historian Karen Hess traced back to Arabic kabees, or "pickling with vinegar". The term was anglicized to caveach, a word first attested in the late 17th century, at the same time as ketchup.

== History ==
The term ketchup first appeared in 1682. The word entered the English language in Britain during the late 17th century, appearing in print as ketchup (1682), catchup (1690), and later as catsup (1730). Recipes for many types of ketchup began to appear in British and then American cookbooks in the 18th century.

=== Mushroom ketchup ===
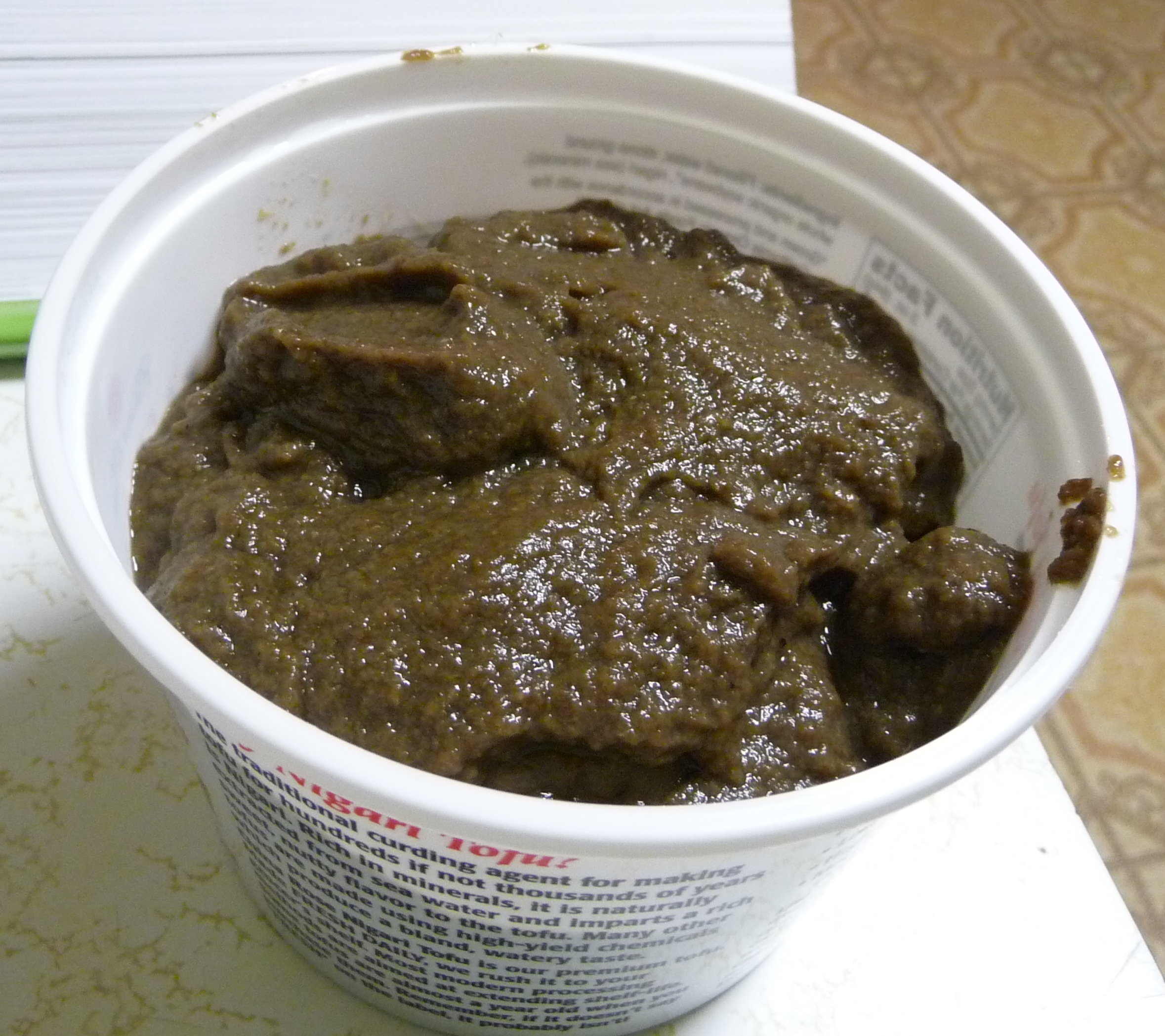
Homemade mushroom ketchup in a plastic tub

In the United Kingdom, from the 1600s ketchup was prepared with mushrooms as a primary ingredient, rather than tomatoes. In the United States, mushroom ketchup dates back to at least 1770, and was prepared by British colonists in the Thirteen Colonies.

=== Tomato ketchup ===
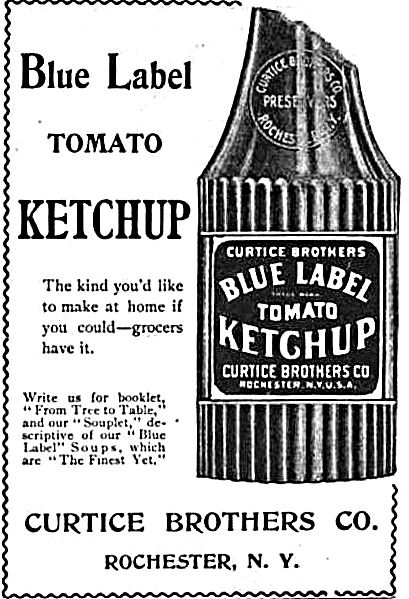
Blue Label Tomato Ketchup advertisement, Curtice Brothers, 1898

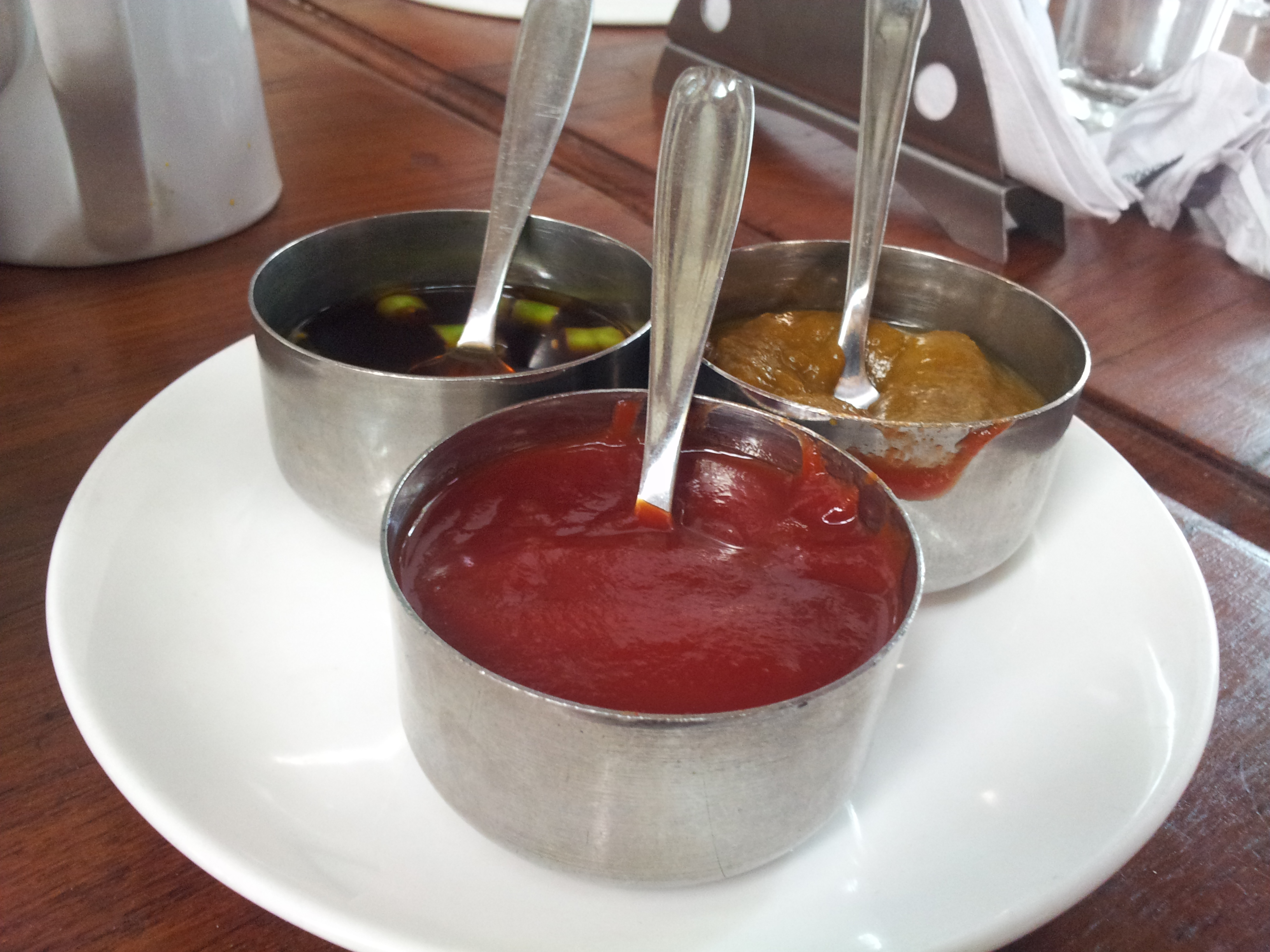
Tomato ketchup and other condiments

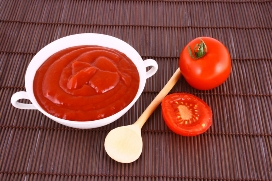
Tomato ketchup next to raw tomatoes

James Mease published the first known tomato ketchup recipe in 1812. An early recipe for "tomato catsup" from 1817 includes anchovies and cochineal (a species of insect used for carmine dye).

In 1824, a ketchup recipe using tomatoes appeared in The Virginia Housewife (an influential 19th-century cookbook written by Mary Randolph, Thomas Jefferson's cousin). Tomato ketchup was sold locally by farmers. Jonas Yerkes is credited as the first American to sell it in a bottle. By 1837, he had produced and distributed the condiment nationally. By the mid-1850s, anchovies were no longer featured as an ingredient.

Shortly thereafter, other companies followed suit. By 1897, the Sears catalog reported "there are hundreds of brands of Catsup on the market, a few of them good."

American cooks also began to sweeten ketchup in the 19th century. The Webster's Dictionary of 1913 defined "catsup" as: "table sauce made from mushrooms, tomatoes, walnuts, etc. [Also written as ketchup]." As the century progressed, tomato ketchup began to gain popularity in the United States. Tomato ketchup was popular long before fresh tomatoes were. People were less hesitant to eat tomatoes as part of a highly processed product that had been cooked and infused with vinegar and spices.

With industrial ketchup production and a need for better preservation, there was a great increase of sugar in ketchup, leading to the typically sweet and sour formula of today. In Australia, it was not until the late 19th century that sugar was added to tomato sauce, initially in small quantities, but today it contains just as much as American ketchup and only differed in the proportions of tomatoes, salt and vinegar in early recipes. While ketchup and tomato sauce are both sold in Australia, American ketchup is sweeter and thicker, whereas Australian tomato sauce is more sour and runny.

Modern ketchup emerged in the early years of the 20th century, out of a debate over the use of sodium benzoate as a preservative in condiments. Harvey W. Wiley, the "father" of the US Food and Drug Administration, challenged the safety of benzoate which was banned in the 1906 Pure Food and Drug Act. In response, entrepreneurs including Henry J. Heinz, pursued an alternative recipe that eliminated the need for that preservative. Katherine Bitting, a bacteriologist working for the U.S. Department of Agriculture, carried out research in 1909 that proved increasing the sugar and vinegar content of the product would prevent spoilage without use of artificial preservatives. She was assisted by Arvil Bitting, her husband and an official at that agency.

Prior to Heinz, commercial tomato ketchups of that time were watery and thin, in part because they used unripe tomatoes, which were low in pectin. They had less vinegar than modern ketchups; by pickling ripe tomatoes, the need for benzoate was eliminated without spoilage or degradation in flavor. The changes driven by the desire to eliminate benzoate also produced changes that some experts (such as Andrew F. Smith) believe were key to the establishment of tomato ketchup as the dominant American condiment.

=== Later innovations ===
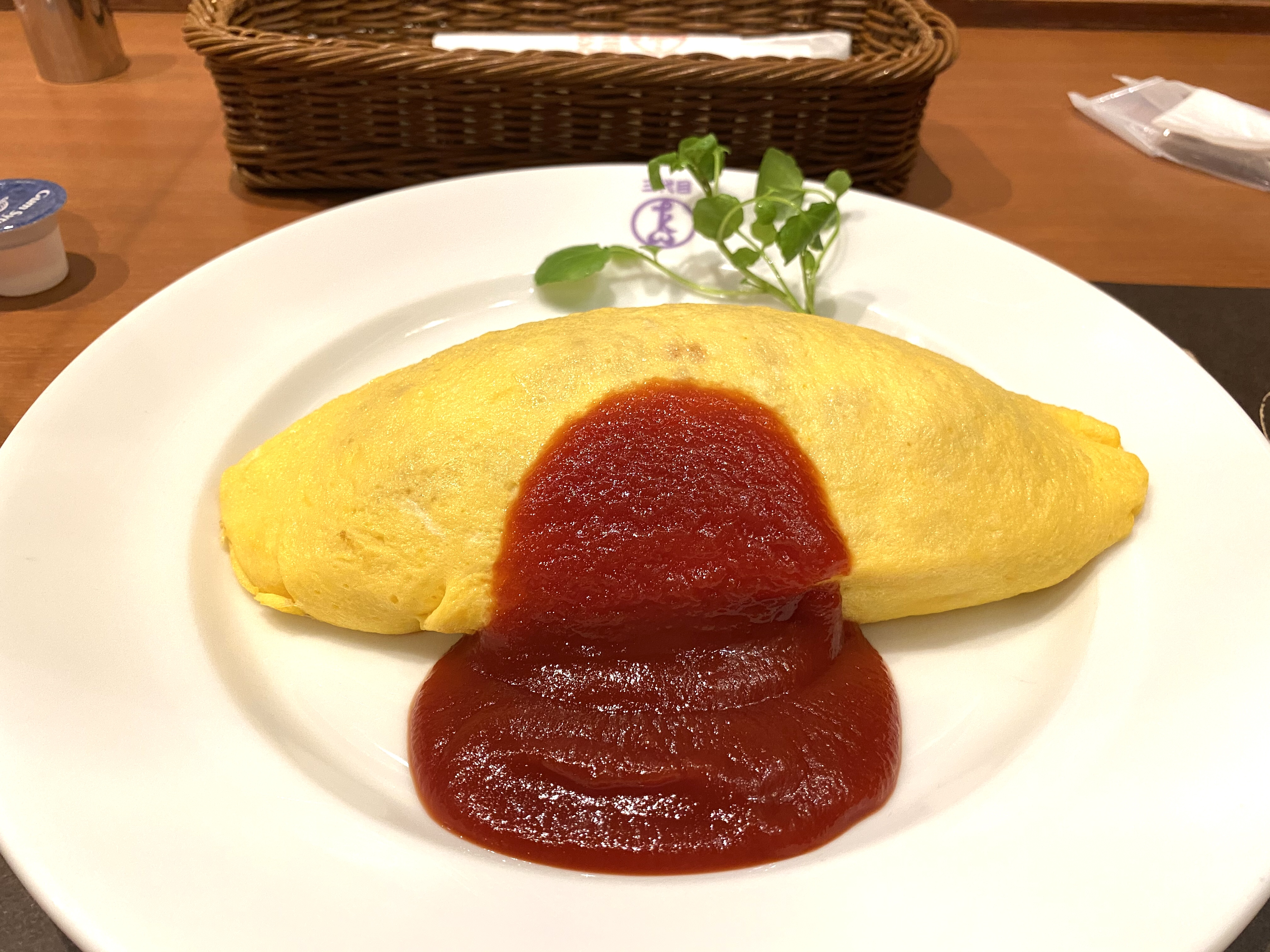
Omurice served with tomato ketchup

At fast food outlets, ketchup is often dispensed in small sachets or tubs. Diners tear the side or top of packets and squeeze ketchup out of them or peel the foil lid off tubs for dipping.

Some fast food outlets previously dispensed ketchup from hand-operated pumps into paper cups. This method has made a comeback in the first decades of the 21st century, as cost and environmental concerns over the increasing use of individual plastic ketchup tubs were taken into account.

== Properties ==
=== Composition ===
Some ketchup in the U.S. is labeled "Fancy", a USDA grade related to relative density (also known as specific gravity). Fancy ketchup has a higher tomato solid concentration than other USDA grades.

USDA ketchup grades
Grade	Specific gravity	Total solids
Fancy	1.15	33%
Extra Standard	1.13	29%
Standard	1.11	25%

=== Nutrition ===
The following table compares the nutritional value of ketchup with raw ripe tomatoes and salsa, based on information from the USDA Food Nutrient Database.

Nutrient (per 100 g)	Ketchup	Low-sodium ketchup	Tomatoes, year-round	USDA commodity salsa
Energy	419 kJ; 100 kcal	435 kJ; 104 kcal	75 kJ; 18 kcal	150 kJ; 36 kcal
Water	68.33 g	66.58 g	94.50 g	89.70 g
Protein	1.74 g	1.52 g	0.88 g	1.50 g
Fats	0.49 g	0.36 g	0.20 g	0.20 g
Carbohydrates	25.78 g	27.28 g	3.92 g	7.00 g
Sodium	1110 mg	20 mg	5 mg	430 mg
Vitamin C	15.1 mg	15.1 mg	12.7 mg	4 mg
Lycopene	17.0 mg	19.0 mg	2.6 mg	n/a

=== Viscosity ===
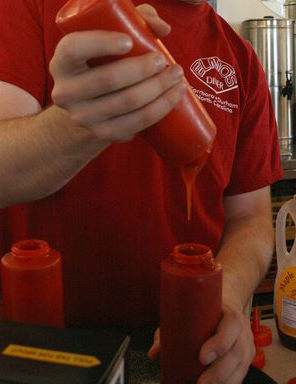
Transferring ketchup between plastic bottles

Ketchup is a non-Newtonian fluid, meaning that its viscosity changes under stress and is not constant. It is a shear thinning fluid, which means its viscosity decreases with increased shear stress. The equation used to designate a non-Newtonian fluid is as follows: $\eta=\tau/\dot{y}$. This equation represents apparent viscosity where apparent viscosity is the shear stress divided by shear rate. Viscosity is dependent on stress. This is apparent when one shakes a bottle of ketchup so it becomes liquid enough to squirt out. Its viscosity decreases with stress.

Graph representation of the three main fluid viscosity categories

The molecular composition of ketchup is what creates its pseudoplastic characteristics. Small polysaccharides, sugars, acids, and water make up the majority of the metastable ketchup product, and these small structures are able to move more easily throughout a matrix because of their low mass. While exposed to shear stress, the molecules within the suspension are able to respond quickly and create an alignment within the product. The bonds between the molecules are mostly hydrogen bonds, ionic interactions, and electrostatic interactions, all of which can be broken when subject to stress. Hydrogen bonds are constantly rearranging within a product due to their need to be in the lowest energy state, which further confirms that the bonds between the molecules will be easily disrupted. This alignment only lasts for as long as shear stress is applied. The molecules return to their original disorganized state once the shear stress dissipates.

In 2017, researchers at the Massachusetts Institute of Technology reported the development of a bottle coating that allowed all the product to slip out without leaving a residue.

In 2022, researchers at the University of Oxford found that splatter from a near-empty bottle can be prevented by squeezing more slowly and doubling the diameter of the nozzle.

=== Separation ===
Ketchup is one of the many products that are leachable, meaning that the water within the product migrates together as the larger molecules within the product sediment, ultimately causing water to separate out. This forms a layer of water on top of the ketchup due to the molecular instability within the product. This instability is caused by interactions between hydrophobic molecules and charged molecules within the ketchup suspension.

Pectin is a polysaccharide within tomatoes that has the ability to bind to itself and to other molecules, especially water, around it. This enables it to create a gel-like matrix, dependent on the amount within the solution. Water is a large part of ketchup, due to it being 80% of the composition of distilled vinegar. In order for the water within the ketchup to be at the lowest possible energy state, all of the hydrogen bonds that are able to be made within the matrix must be made. The water bound to the polysaccharide moves more slowly within the matrix, which is unfavorable with respect to entropy. The increased order within the polysaccharide-water complex gives rise to a high-energy state, in which the water will want to be relieved. This concept implies that water will more favorably bind with itself because of the increased disorder between water molecules. This is partially the cause for water leaching out of solution when left undisturbed for a short period of time.

== See also ==
- Fry sauce – Condiment for French fries
- Ketchups:
  - Banana ketchup
  - Curry ketchup
  - Fruit ketchup
- Ketchup as a vegetable – American political controversy circa 1981
- List of dips
- List of condiments
  - Mustard
- Shelf-stable food
- Tkemali – Georgian plum sauce
- Tomato preparations:
  - Tomato jam
  - Tomato paste
  - Tomato purée
  - Tomato sauce
  - More: List of tomato dishes
