= Edith Katherine Cash =

American mycologist (1890–1992)

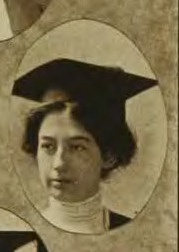
- Born: October 14, 1890; Binghamton
- Died: April 6, 1992 (aged 101); Binghamton
- Resting place: Rock Creek Cemetery; Washington, D.C., U.S.
- Alma mater: George Washington University
- Occupation: Mycologist, botanical collector, scientific collector
- Employer: United States Department of Agriculture

Edith Katherine Cash (October 14, 1890 – April 6, 1992) was an American mycologist.

== Early life ==
Edith Cash was born in Binghamton, New York, to John Ferris Cash and Adella Knapp Cash. She graduated from George Washington University in 1912 with an AB degree in history and languages and was the recipient of the Thomas F. Walsh undergraduate prize for academic excellence. She was knowledgeable about European literature, and according to the catalog from George Washington University, her major was in French with a minor in French and English. She studied as an assistant only one-night weekly during six months (October 1921 to May 1922) to obtain her formal mycology training, at the USDA Graduate School. Together with Flora Wambaugh Patterson and William Webster Diehl she issued the exsiccata-like series Mycological exchange of 1921 with specimens distributed by the USDA. She spent her entire research career in this institution. Cash started as a botanical translator in 1913. After 11 years, she advanced from that position to junior pathologist (1924). She obtained the position as assistant pathologist in 1929, after that as associate mycologist in 1944 and finally as mycologist in 1956.

== Career ==
Cash is remembered by her mycologist and botanist colleagues as a scholar and mentor to young people in their careers. As a professional, she was known for her attention to detail and accuracy, which propelled her to positions as an editor of scientific journals. She was the editor of the mycology section of Biological Abstracts for many years, and the only person to complete three five-year periods as a member on the editorial board of Mycologia.

Cash published 14 papers during her first decade as pathologist-mycologist, 11 of which were on Discomycetes, where she described 37 new species. The Discomycetes are a former taxonomic group inside of ascomycetes. Fungi that possess cup-shaped apothecia were known as Discomycetes. She also described many species from Sclerotinia, promoting interest in the study of this genus.

During her research career, she described species of Discomycetes from many countries and other kinds of fungi. Her publications include the description of Discomycetes from California (Cash 1958), Hawaii (Cash 1938), Discomycetes and Hysteriales from Florida (Cash 1943), South America, India and fungi found on living orchids. Fungus specimens were collected at ports by inspectors of the Plant Quarantine Branch, Agricultural Research Services, United States of Agriculture, certain fungus species were reported for the first time on orchids (Cash and Watson 1955). She also published A Mycological English-Latin Glossary in 1965. In addition to her publications, Cash described 134 new species of fungi, all reported in peer-reviewed scientific journals, and identified over 11000 fungi specimens, including describing over 600 species of fungi and plants in Latin for her colleagues worldwide.

Cash retired on May 31, 1958, but continued working on her own research and preparing descriptions in Latin for her colleagues around the world. In 1975, Cash and her sister moved to Binghamton, New York, where she started teaching community members to enjoy and recognize local flowering plants. She never married and was 101 years old when she died on April 6, 1992. Her remains are in the Rock Creek Cemetery, Washington D.C. close to those of her older sister Lillian Claire Cash, who was a microbiologist.

== Honors and awards ==
Cash obtained the competitive US Government Superior Service Award in 1956 for the world-wide fungus index, which was used as the principal source for background information on fungus nomenclature and taxonomy. She was honored in the Gallery of Contemporary Noted Mycologists within three years of her retirement. Cash was a member of American Phytopathological Society, The American Association for the Advancement of Science, listed in American Men of Science in 1960, and a charter member of the Mycological Society of America. Fungal taxa named in her honor include the genus Cashiella, and the fungus Lamprospora cashiae.

== Selected works ==
- Cash E. K. (1938). "New records of Hawaiian Discomycetes". Mycologia. 30 (1): 97–107. doi:10.2307/3754484. JSTOR 3754484.
- Cash E. K. (1943). "Some new or rare Florida Discomycetes and Hysteriales". Mycologia. 35 (6): 595–603. doi:10.2307/3754902. JSTOR 3754902.
- Cash E. K.; Watson A. J. (1955). "Some fungi on Orchidaceae". Mycologia. 47 (5): 729–747. doi:10.2307/3755582. JSTOR 3755582.
- Cash E. K. (1958). "Some new Discomycetes from California". Mycologia. 50 (5): 642–656. doi:10.2307/3756172. JSTOR 3756172.

== See also ==
- List of mycologists
