= Plant Quarantine Act =

1912 law of the United States Congress

- Long title: An Act to regulate the importation of nursery stock and other plants and plant products; to enable' the Secretary of Agriculture to establish and maintain quarantine districts for plant diseases and insect pests; to permit and regulate the movement of fruits, plants, and vegetables therefrom, and for other purposes.
- Nicknames: Plant Quarantine Act of 1912
- Enacted by: the 62nd United States Congress
- Effective: October 1, 1912

Citations
- Public law: 62-275
- Statutes at Large: 37 Stat. 315

Codification
- Titles amended: 7 U.S.C.: Agriculture
- U.S.C. sections created: 7 U.S.C. ch. 8 § 151 et seq.

Legislative history
- Introduced in the House as H.R. 24119 by James S. Simmons (R–NY) on May 6, 1912; Committee consideration by House Agriculture, Senate Agriculture; Signed into law by President William H. Taft on August 20, 1912

The Plant Quarantine Act, originally enacted in 1912 (7 U.S.C. 151 et seq.), gave the Animal and Plant Health Inspection Service (APHIS) authority to regulate the importation and interstate movement of nursery stock and other plants that may carry pests and diseases that are harmful to agriculture. This Act has been superseded by the consolidated APHIS statute, the Plant Protection Act of 2000 (7 U.S.C. 7701 et seq.). This authority is particularly important to the agency’s ability to prevent or limit the spread of harmful invasive species within or to a state or region of the United States.

== Provisions of Act ==
The Plant Quarantine Act was codified as fifteen sections formulating regulations and rules for the importation of nursery stock including annual plants and biennial plants.

7 U.S.C § 151 -	Definition of "Persons" to include corporations
7 U.S.C § 152 -	Definition of "Nursery Stock"
7 U.S.C § 153 -	Persons to include corporations and corporations liable for acts of agents
7 U.S.C § 154 -	Unlawful importing of nursery stock without permit, requirement of foreign inspection certificate, and conditions if no inspection abroad
7 U.S.C § 155 -	Imports for use by Department of Agriculture
7 U.S.C § 156 -	Notification of arrival at port of entry, port of entry forwarding forbidden without notification, and required inspection
7 U.S.C § 157 -	Marking required on goods entering the United States
7 U.S.C § 158 -	Marking required in interstate shipments
7 U.S.C § 159 -	Restriction on importing plants other than nursery stock and issue of order
7 U.S.C § 160 -	Plant diseases and insect infestation, determination of existence in country or locality, importations prohibited after promulgation of determination, and quarantine immediately effective
7 U.S.C § 161 -	Interstate quarantine against plant diseases or insect infestation, shipments from quarantined localities forbidden, movements of nursery stock subject to conditions, and rules for inspection to be issued
7 U.S.C § 162 -	Duty of Secretary of Agriculture
7 U.S.C § 163 -	Punishment for violations
7 U.S.C § 164 -	Common carriers and prosecutions
7 U.S.C § 165 -	Establishment of Federal Horticulture Board

== Amendments to 1912 Act ==
U.S. Congressional amendments to the Plant Quarantine Act.

Date of Enactment	Public Law Number	U.S. Statute Citation	U.S. Legislative Bill	U.S. Presidential Administration
April 13, 1926	Public Resolution 69-14	44 Stat. 250	S.J.Res. 78	Calvin Coolidge
May 1, 1928	P.L. 70-327	45 Stat. 468	H.R. 484	Calvin Coolidge
June 4, 1936	P.L. 74-643	49 Stat. 1461	H.R. 8495	Franklin D. Roosevelt
July 31, 1947	P.L. 80-290	61 Stat. 680	S. 338	Harry S. Truman
October 10, 1978	P.L. 95-439	92 Stat. 1061	S. 286	Jimmy E. Carter
January 8, 1983	P.L. 97-432	96 Stat. 2276	H.R. 5456	Ronald W. Reagan
