= Yorkshire Mycological Committee =

Historically Important Natural History Organisation

- Abbreviation: YMC
- Formation: 1892; 134 years ago
- Legal status: Committee
- Purpose: Education, environmentalism
- Headquarters: Yorkshire, England
- Main organ: Yorkshire Naturalists' Union

The Yorkshire Mycological Committee is a committee within the Yorkshire Naturalists' Union. First formed in 1892, it was the first permanent organisation dedicated to the study of fungi in Great Britain. It was the principal founding organisation of the British Mycological Society.

== History ==
The Mycological Committee was first founded in 1892 so that the Yorkshire Naturalists' Union might better organise its recording of fungi across Yorkshire via annual 'fungal forays'. The Rev. William Fowler was appointed as its first Chairman with Charles Crossland being appointed its first secretary. George Edward Massee would succeed Fowler and together with Crossland would run the Committee until 1916.

The period of Massee's tenure would see the Mycological Committee function completely independently of the British Mycological Society (a national mycological society founded primarily by members of Mycological Committee. This was primarily due to a disagreement of an unknown nature between Massee and Carleton Rea, a prominent figure in the British Mycological Society.

By 1903, the Committee was so prominent that it attracted the attention of George Francis Atkinson who attended the 1903 foray as a guest of George Edward Massee. Notably, he did not attend any events hosted by the British Mycological Society.

== Notable members ==
- George Francis Atkinson (1854–1918; visiting member)
- George Edward Massee (1845–1917)
- Charles Crossland (1844–1916)
- James Needham (1849–1913)
- Kathleen Sampson (1892–1980)
- Henry Thomas Soppitt (1858–1899)
- Harold Wager (1862–1929)
- Roy Watling (b. 1938)
