= Denis Garrett =

British plant pathologist and mycologist

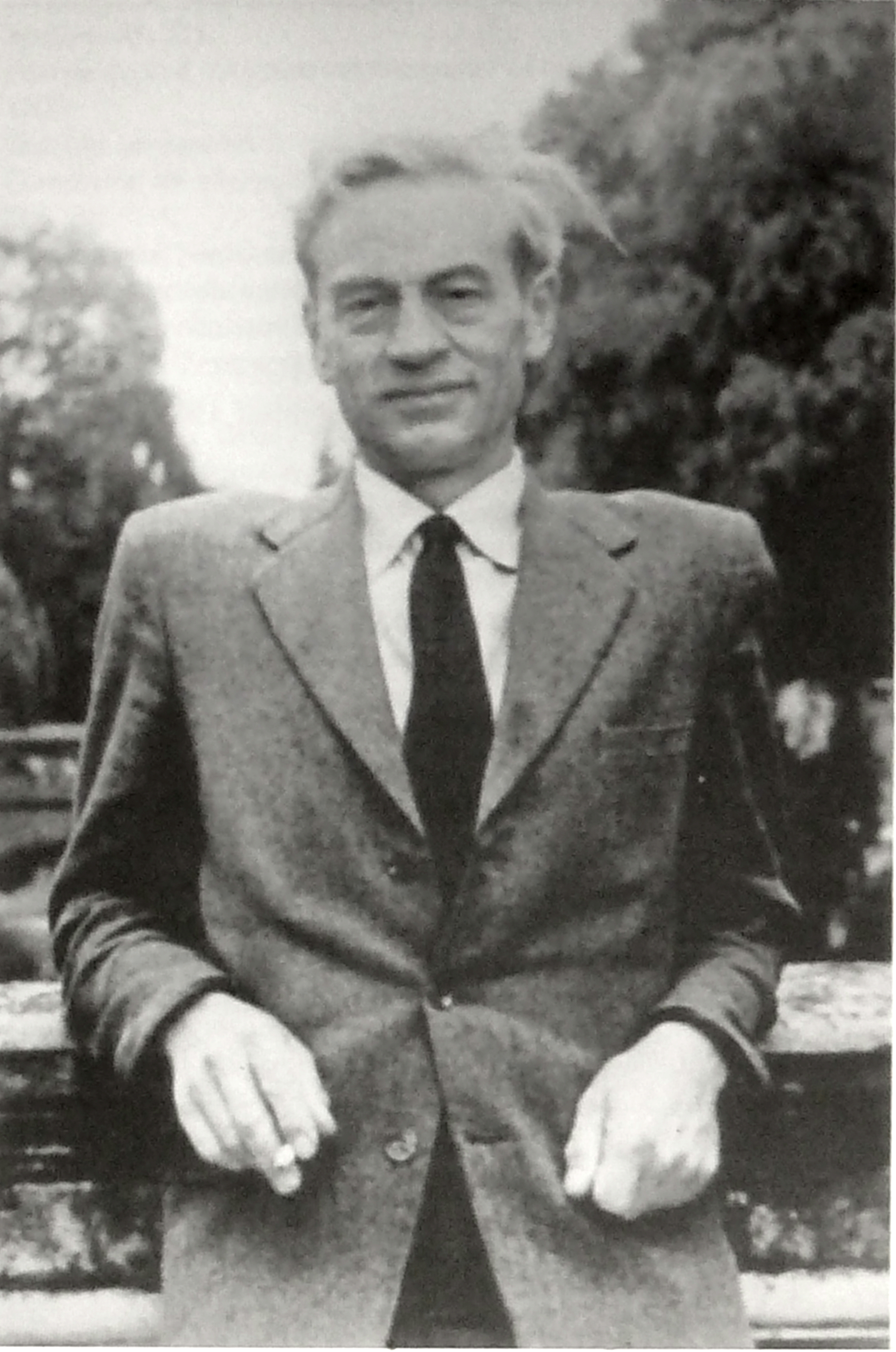
Stephen Denis Garrett

Stephen Denis Garrett (Note: His friends and family called him Denis, but he was known as Stephen at his college.) FRS (1 November 1906 – 26 December 1989) was a British plant pathologist and mycologist who did pioneering work on soil-borne pathogens, root pathology and soil ecology. He was the first to apply ecological concepts to interactions in the soil. Much of his research used as a model system the fungus Gaeumannomyces graminis, which causes the important cereal disease take-all. He also studied Armillaria root rot of trees, among other plant diseases.

Garrett spent most of his career at Rothamsted Experimental Station (1936–48) and the University of Cambridge's school of botany (1949–73), where he was professor of mycology and acting head of department, and also held a fellowship at Magdalene College. He was president of the British Mycological Society and was instrumental in founding the forerunner of the British Society for Plant Pathology. He published four books, of which Root Disease Fungi (1944) and Biology of Root-infecting Fungi (1956) were the most influential, and was the editor of Annals of Applied Biology and Transactions of the British Mycological Society.

== Early life and education ==
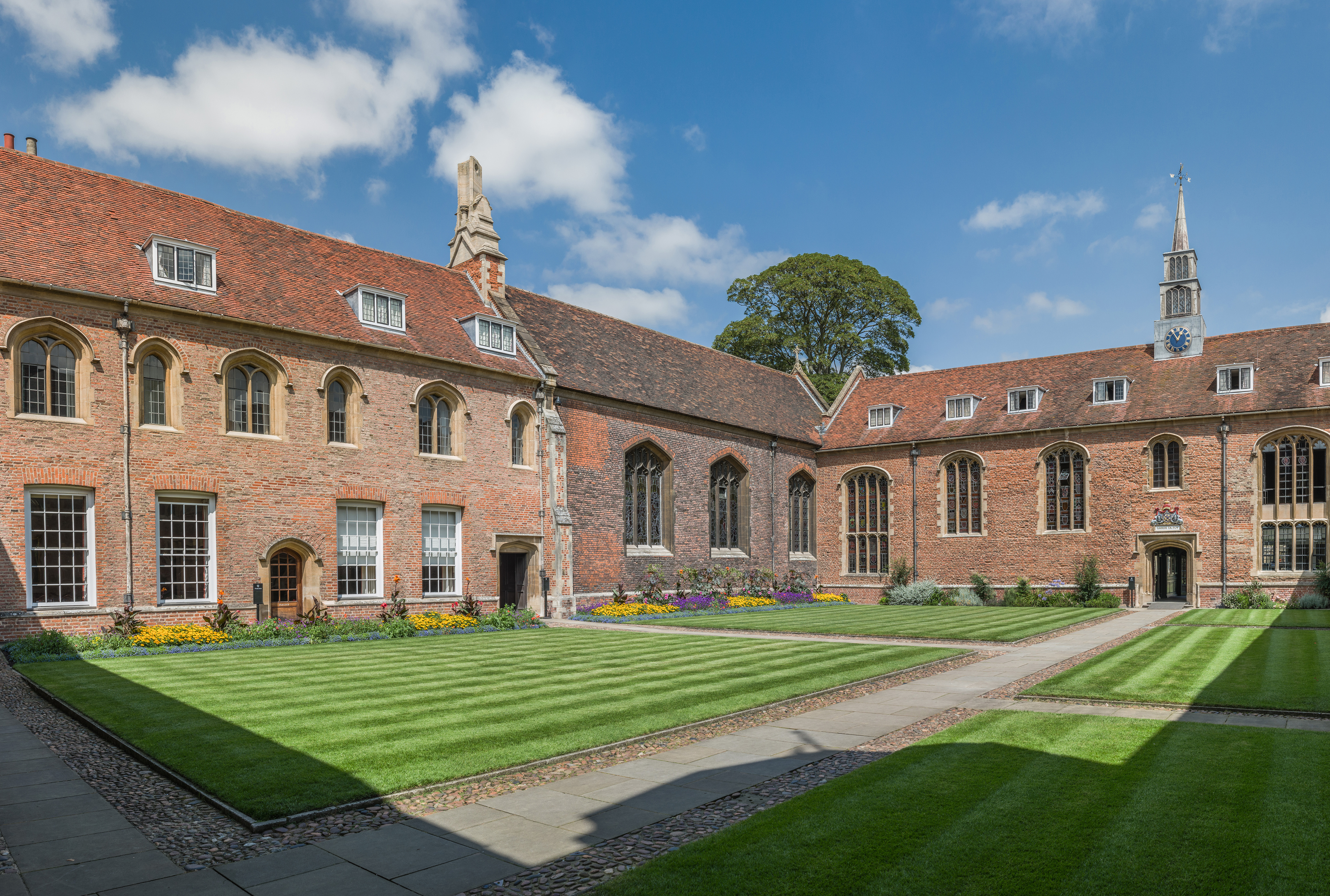
Magdalene College, where Garrett studied and was a fellow from 1962

Denis Garrett was born in 1906 at Leiston, Suffolk, to Mary (née Marples), from a Sheffield tool-making family, and Stephen Garrett (1878–1915), a director in the family's agricultural machinery business in Leiston, Richard Garrett & Sons. He was the eldest of four children. His father was killed in action at the Battle of Neuve Chapelle during the First World War when he was eight, and his mother moved the family to Oxford, where her sister lived, and later to Eastbourne. Garrett attended the Dragon School in Oxford, and briefly Wellington College, from which he ran away, and Eastbourne College, where he became interested in plant biology, despite a lack of biology classes, as well as mathematics.

He read natural sciences at Magdalene College, University of Cambridge in 1926–29, gaining a second-class degree in botany and also studying chemistry and geology. He was taught by the botanist Sir Albert Seward, the plant physiologist F. F. Blackman, the mycologist and plant pathologist F. T. Brooks, and was particularly influenced by the ecologist Harry Godwin.

== Career ==
On the recommendation of Brooks, Garrett took up a post as an assistant plant pathologist at the Waite Research Institute in Adelaide, South Australia (1929–33), under Geoffrey Samuel. He started to research two fungal diseases of cereals, take-all and no-growth diseases, and published his first research paper with Samuel in 1932. On his return to the UK, Garrett received a Leverhulme Fellowship in 1934, with which he researched at Imperial College, London under the plant pathologist William Brown, whom Garrett took as a model, stating that Brown had taught him "the art of scientific investigation". Garrett received a diploma from Imperial College (1935), but the fellowship did not permit the granting of a PhD degree.

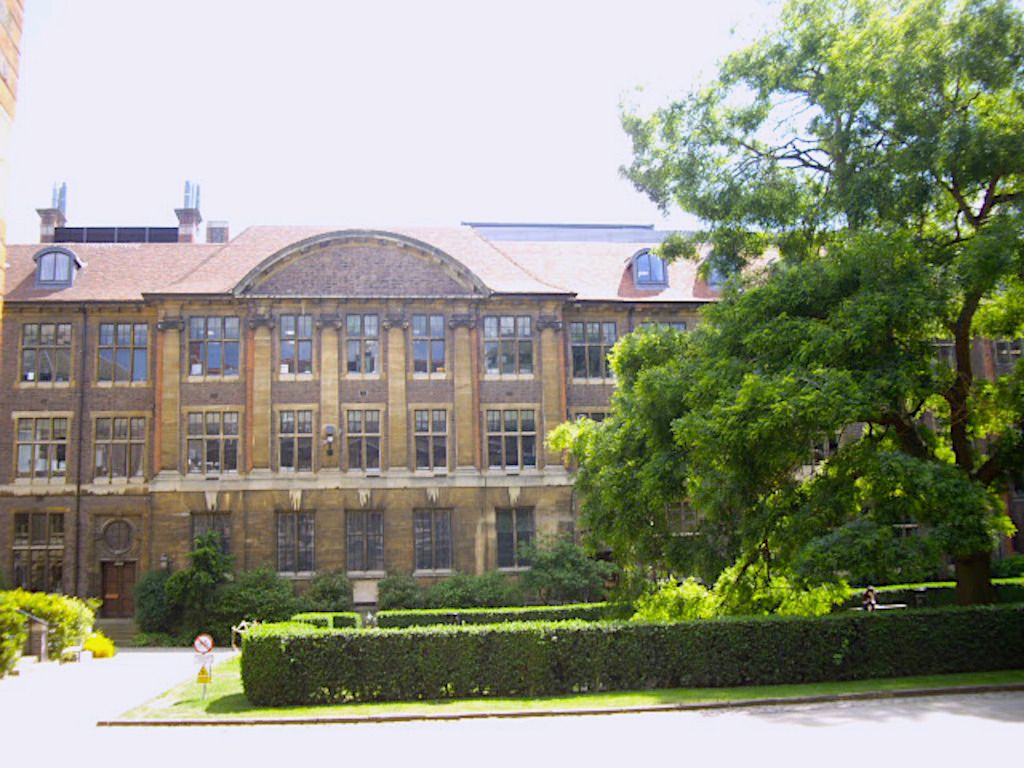
The Cambridge department of plant sciences, where Garrett worked in 1949–73

In 1936, he moved to the plant pathology department at Rothamsted Experimental Station, where he remained for twelve years, mainly under the plant virologist Frederick Bawden. He continued to work there during the Second World War, serving as a member of the Home Guard and a fire attendant. He was awarded an Sc.D. degree by the University of Cambridge in 1947 for the work he did at Rothamsted. In 1948, he spent around six months as a plant pathologist at the West Indian Banana Research Scheme in Jamaica studying Panama disease, a fungal disease of bananas, but found the climate unbearable and was forced by illness to return prematurely.

In 1949, Garrett took up a lectureship in mycology at the University of Cambridge's school of botany (now the plant sciences department), where he remained for the rest of his career, rising to reader in botany (1961–71) and then professor of mycology (1971–73). He was the head of the small but widely respected mycology sub-department (1952–73), and also served as acting head of the botany school. He became a fellow of Magdalene College in 1962. In 1963–64 he held a visiting professorship at Cairo University. He retired in 1973, remaining an emeritus professor, and despite failing health, continued to publish until 1984, carrying out experiments in a laboratory at his home.

He was the editor of the journals Annals of Applied Biology and Transactions of the British Mycological Society (1956–62). He served as president of the British Mycological Society (1953–54) and, with Philip H. Gregory, was instrumental in founding the Federation of British Plant Pathologists in 1966, which became the British Society for Plant Pathology in 1981. He was the chair of the organising committee of the inaugural International Congress of Plant Pathology, held in London in 1968.

== Research and writings ==
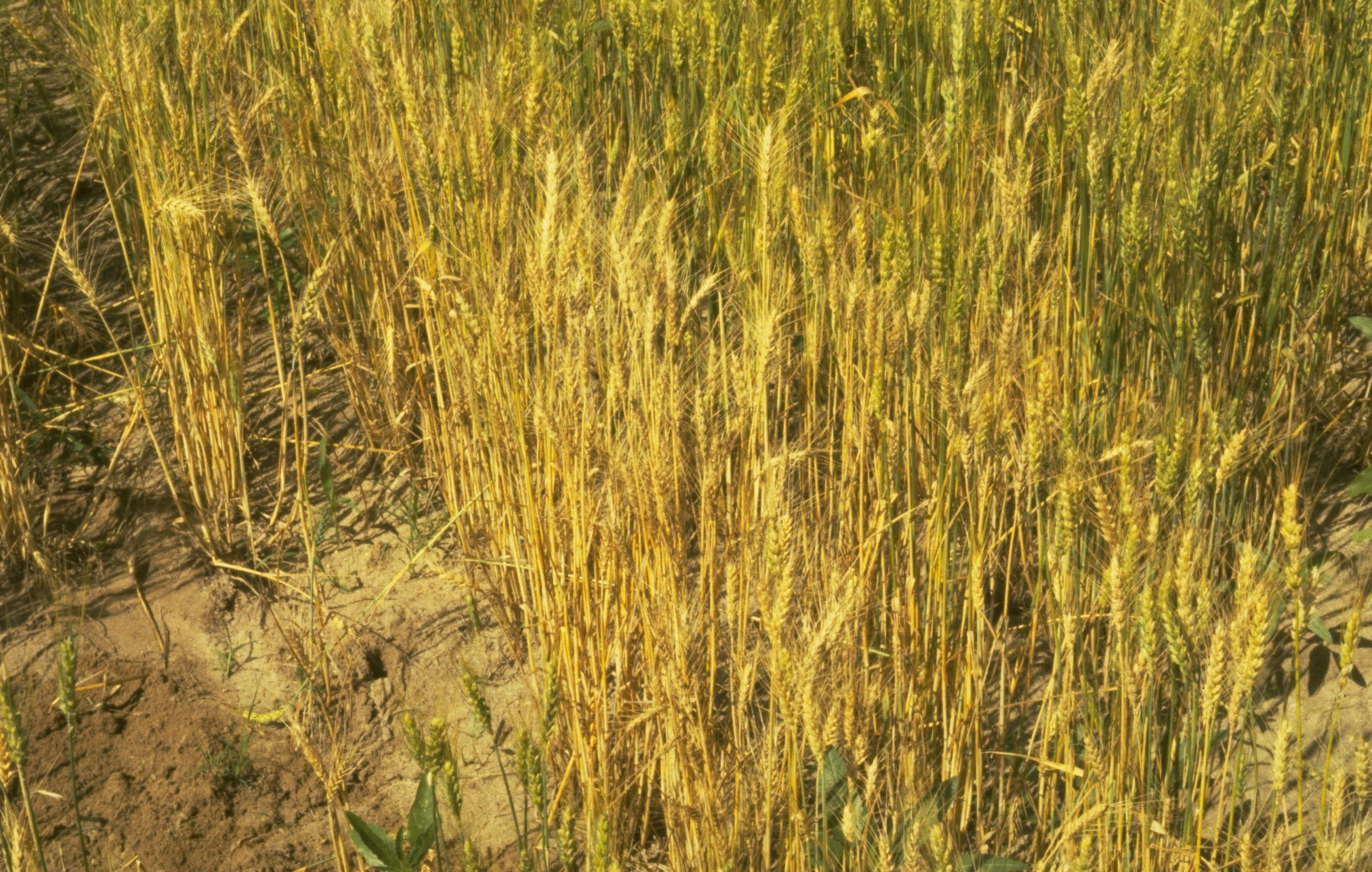
Wheat showing symptoms of take-all, a disease Garrett researched extensively

Garrett's research focused on plant root disease caused by soil-borne pathogens, particularly fungi, and aimed to elucidate the pathogen's natural activity with a view to preventing or controlling plant disease. He is acknowledged as "the founding father of root pathology." Recognising that root pathology is complex and multifactorial, and describing then-current methodology as "crude and inadequate", he used an experimental approach that changed one factor against a constant background. Most of his experiments were simple and eschewed technology to use only basic equipment; for example, he preferred jam jars and glass tumblers to specialist soil containers because they were less expensive, and even once purchased rejected plastic lavatory cisterns for his laboratory to use. His colleagues at Cambridge described him as "one of the last 'string and sealing wax' scientists." He also studied the saprophytic and survival stages of the pathogen's life cycle, in addition to the parasitic stage.

Much of his work focused on Gaeumannomyces graminis (previously classified in the genus Ophiobolus), a soil-borne fungus that is the causative agent of take-all, the principal root disease of wheat, which Garrett employed as a model disease system. His early papers on soil conditions and G. graminis, based on work at Rothamsted before the Second World War, are described by the Indian mycologist C. V. Subramanian as "very original in approach, content and technique, and are classic." Garrett showed that the level of bacteria in the soil influences infection with G. graminis, an early demonstration of Howard S. Fawcett's concept of biological antagonism or competition in the soil. He showed that the fungus was unable to spread through soil, requiring direct hyphal contact with a root; this was later shown by Garrett's laboratory and others to be the result of limited oxygen. He examined how the fungus could nevertheless persist in soil, finding that in the presence of sufficient nitrogen it was able to grow using cellulose from cereal stubble as a carbon source. He studied how likely individual fungal spores are to infect.

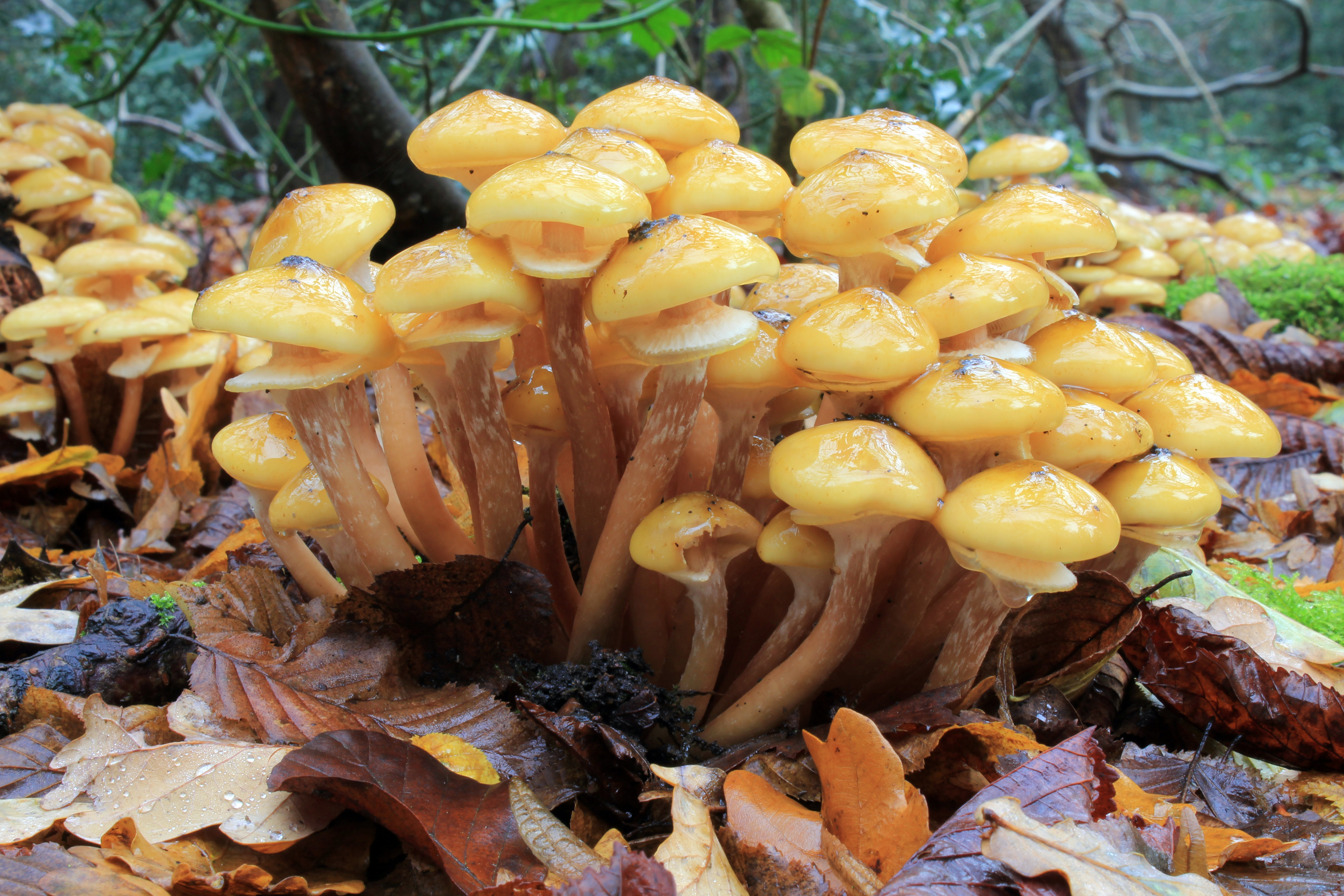
Armillaria mellea, which Garrett worked on in 1950–60

In 1950–60, Garrett worked mainly on Armillaria mellea, a fungus which causes Armillaria root rot in trees, and its prevention by fumigating the soil. He also researched other plant pathogens during his career, including other cereal foot-rot fungi; Helicobasidium purpureum, which causes violet root rot in sugar beets; and Plasmodiophora brassicae, an organism now classified as protist-like which causes clubroot in brassicas.

From 1960, he researched the utilisation of cellulose substrates under different conditions by a range of fungi that infect roots, finding wide variation, and used these differences to classify soil fungi into functional groups. These depended on whether the host plant was woody (high cellulose-lysing activity) or herbaceous (very low cellulose-lysing activity). He proposed that there are commensal fungi that require other microorganisms to break down cellulose, which were later discovered by H. T. Tribe.

His research contributed to understanding soil ecology, a field in which Garrett was an early investigator, and his work has been acknowledged as the foundation of the field of soil-borne plant pathogen ecology. He was the first to apply the ecological concepts developed for surface communities, such as succession, to the underground interplay between plant roots, soil fungi and other soil microorganisms, an approach described as "innovative". Sally E. Smith, one of his students, said that he "gave a real feel to the cold, dark, wet world below." He published "influential" classifications of soil fungi in the 1950s, based on their ecological niche, defining root-inhabiting, root-infecting and soil-inhabiting groups. In 1973, he published an essay on how pathogenic fungi infect and reproduce in the face of plant disease resistance, focusing on nutritional requirements, and later extended his ideas to include competition or antagonism. Although some researchers found these ideas valuable, this work was criticised by R. K. S. Wood as using terms such as "energy" so loosely as to make the work "almost meaningless". He was an early supporter of exploiting antagonism for the biological control of plant diseases, for example in a 1963 presentation, but warned that many applications were not practical.

He was described by Peter J. Grubb, E. Anne Stow and S. Max Walters as having "an ability to extract from complex systems simple concepts that could be approached experimentally."

=== Books ===
Garrett is described by J. W. Deacon as a "naturally gifted writer" whose "flair" and "flowing but precise style" render "even the most difficult concept easy to understand", while R. C. Cooke criticises his "quaint and old-fashioned" writing. The first of Garrett's four books, Root Disease Fungi (1944), draws together existing research on root-infecting pathogens, mainly by others, focusing on well-researched species that cause economically significant disease. A contemporary review by G. Metcalfe describes it as "authoritative and very readable", praising its emphasis on practical information as well as its organisation of earlier work. Deacon later describes it as "a tour de force in assembling and synthesizing all the then known information on effects of environmental factors on soilborne plant pathogens". Subramanian describes it as "timely", stating that it sparked international research on the fungi causing root diseases.

Biology of Root-infecting Fungi (1956) and Pathogenic Root-infecting Fungi (1970) review more-recent work by Garrett and others and expound his ideas; Garrett writes in the first person and employs "parables" to make his points. A contemporary review of Biology of Root-infecting Fungi by the mycologist John Webster praises its "holistic approach", and writes that it introduces "useful generalizations and new concepts" that elucidate "previously puzzling data", and that its "crystallization of ideas ... put the subject on a more sound theoretical basis", predicting that they will provide a basis for future experiments. Cooke, writing in 1971, calls the earlier book highly influential, with "new and exciting ideas" that stimulated research by many other scientists in the field, and praises the follow-up for maintaining the focus on fungal activity and interactions in the natural environment, rather than in the laboratory. Soil Fungi and Soil Fertility (1963) is an undergraduate introductory textbook.

== Personal life ==
On the boat returning from Australia in 1933 or 1934 Garrett met Jane Perkins, who was returning from New Zealand, and they married in 1934. She was the daughter of the artist Christopher Perkins, known for his paintings set in New Zealand. Jane Garrett became a psychiatric social worker, rising to lead that department in Cambridge, and in retirement wrote non-fiction. The couple had three daughters. He had a life-long interest in natural history, especially birds, and after his appointment in Cambridge became an avid and organised plant observer, keeping track of the species that he had observed locally and in Europe using a card index.

Garrett was diagnosed with coeliac disease and diabetes in 1964, and in later life began to lose his sight and was disabled by diabetic neuropathy. He died on 26 December 1989 at Cambridge.

== Awards and honours ==
Garrett was elected a fellow of the Royal Society (1967) and of the Indian Academy of Sciences (1973); he was also a fellow of the Institute of Biology (1964), an honorary fellow of the British Mycological Society (1975), and one of the first two honorary fellows of the British Society for Plant Pathology (1984). An issue of the journal Plant Pathology was dedicated to him in commemoration of his eightieth birthday, and after his death, the British Society for Plant Pathology instituted an annual lecture in his memory.

== Selected publications ==
Books

- S. D. Garrett. Pathogenic Root-infecting Fungi (Cambridge University Press; 1970)
- S. D. Garrett. Soil Fungi and Soil Fertility (Pergamon Press; 1963, 1981) (ISBN 0-08-025507-8)
- S. D. Garrett. Biology of Root-infecting Fungi (Cambridge University Press; 1956)
- S. D. Garrett. Root Disease Fungi (Chronica Botanica/Wm. Dawson and Sons; 1944)

Reviews, conference papers

Sources:

- S. D. Garrett. "Toward biological control of soil-borne plant pathogens", in Ecology and Management of Soil-borne Plant Pathogens (K. F. Baker, W. C. Snyder, eds), pp. 4–17 (John Murray; 1965); originally presented in 1963
- S. D. Garrett (1952). "The soil fungi as a microcosm for ecologists", Science Progress 40: 436–450
- S. D. Garrett (1951). "Ecological groups of soil fungi: a survey of substrate relationships", New Phytologist 50: 149–166

Research paper

His highest-cited (Note: According to Google Scholar in a search on 10 February 2021) research paper is:

- S. D. Garrett (1938). "Soil conditions and the take-all disease of wheat: III. Decomposition of the resting mycelium of Ophiobolus graminis in infected wheat stubble buried in the soil", Annals of Applied Biology 25: 742–766 doi:10.1111/j.1744-7348.1938.tb02351.x
