= British Mycological Society =

UK learned society

- Formation: 1896; 130 years ago
- Type: Biology society
- Registration no.: 276503
- Legal status: Charity
- Purpose: Mycological study; Research
- Headquarters: Manchester, United Kingdom
- Region served: United Kingdom
- Official language: English
- Activities: Research; Publications; Lectures; Events
- Collections: Archives
- Publications: Fungal Biology; Fungal Biology Reviews; Fungal Ecology; Field Mycology; Symposium Series
- President: J. Quinn
- Website: britmycolsoc.org.uk

The British Mycological Society is a learned society established in 1896 to promote the study of fungi.

== Formation ==
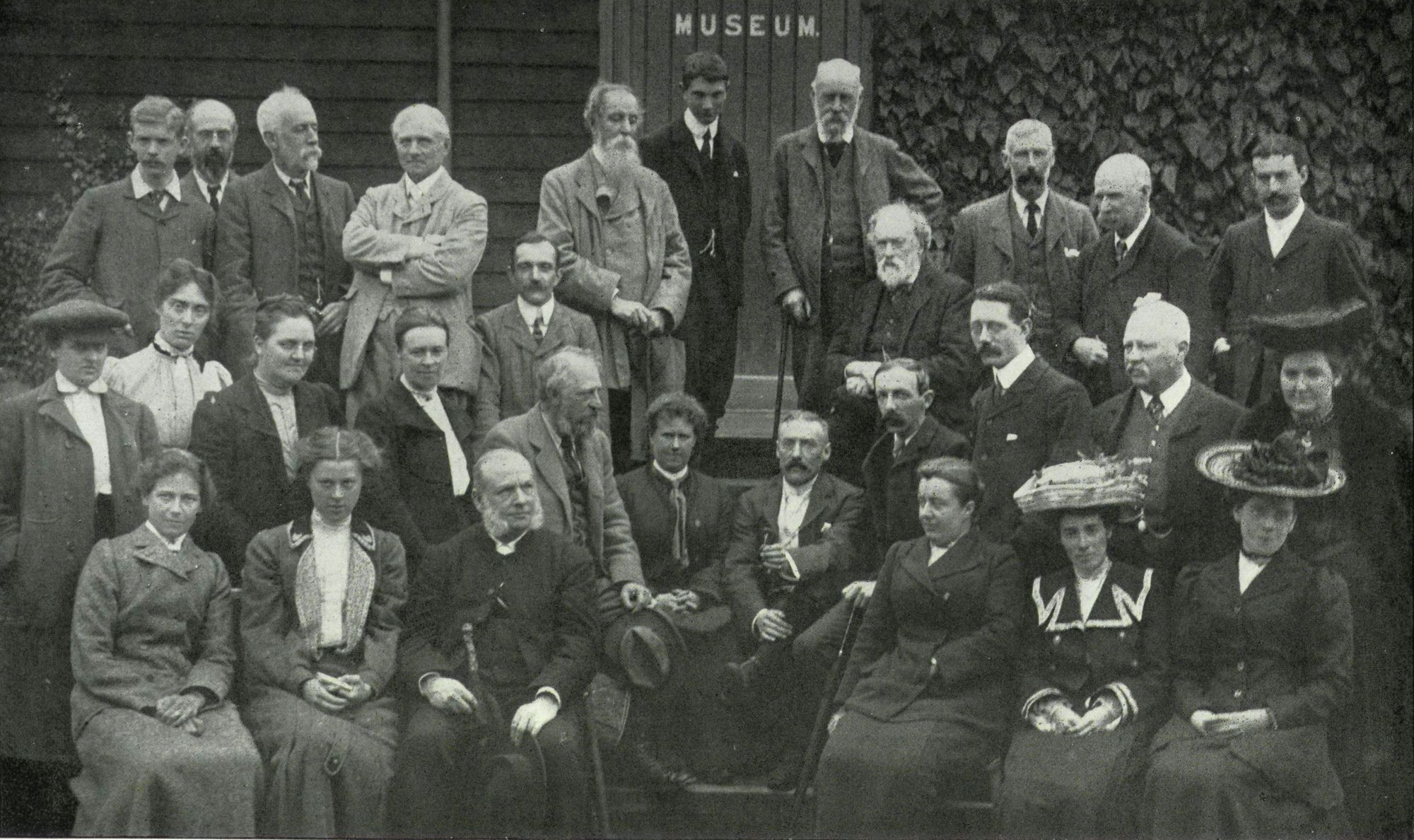
BMS Haslemere fungus foray, 1905

The British Mycological Society (BMS) was formed by the combined efforts of two local societies: the Woolhope Naturalists' Field Club of Hereford and the Yorkshire Naturalists’ Union. The Curator of the Hereford Club, H. G. Bull, convinced the members in 1867 to undertake the particular study of mushrooms. While the mycological efforts of the Club diminished somewhat after Bull's death, the Union of Yorkshire founded its Mycological Committee in 1892. This Committee attracted the involvement of many eminent mycologists including George Edward Massee (1845–1917), James Needham (1849–1913), Charles Crossland (1844–1916), and Henry Thomas Soppitt (1843–1899). Mycologist Kathleen Sampson was a member for sixty years, as well as serving as president in 1938.

The need for a national organisation and the need for a journal to publish their observations led Cooke, Rea, Massee, and other mycologists (including Charles Crossland and James Needham) to found the Society in 1896. The Society's founding officers were Rea (Secretary), Crossland (Treasurer), and Massee (President). The choice of the latter as President was based on his international reputation (with more than 250 mycological publications) and role as the mycologist at the Royal Botanical Gardens, Kew (where he replaced Cooke as mycologist in 1893). In 1897, Rea assumed the additional role of Treasurer, also continuing as Secretary (until 1918), and was also Editor (until 1930). However, Massee and a number of Yorkshire mycologists soon left the BMS, preferring to remain with the Yorkshire Naturalists' Union.

== Membership ==
By 1903, the Society's Members numbered over a hundred, which had increased to over four hundred (by shortly after World War II), and had reached over two thousand by 2006.

Before World War II, Honorary Membership was awarded to:

- 1905 Émile Boudier (1828–1920)
- 1916 Pier Andrea Saccardo (1845–1920)
- 1920 Carleton Rea (1861–1946)
- 1920 Narcisse Théophile Patouillard (1854–1926)
- 1924 Gulielma Lister (1860–1949)

== Publications ==
From 1896, the Society began publishing its annual journal, Transactions of the British Mycological Society (1896–1989), which became Mycological Research (1989–2010) and was renamed Fungal Biology (2010).

In 1967, the Society began publishing the Bulletin of the British Mycological Society (1967–1987), which was renamed The Mycologist (1987–2007) and later became Fungal Biology Reviews (2007). A new journal was also launched entitled Fungal Ecology.

In 2000, the Society began publishing the quarterly journal, Field Mycology (2000) for the study and identification of wild fungi.

Periodically, the Society also publishes symposia in the British Mycological Society Symposium Series on a particular theme. The first was Genetics and Physiology of Aspergillus, edited by John E. Smith and John A. Pateman (1977), and there have been twenty-four symposia published as of 2006. The BMS is also responsible for the management of the FRDBI (Fungal Records Database of Britain & Ireland). The FRDBI holds over 1.5 million records and is a major resource for conservation and research purposes.

The Society also publishes many other items, from fine art prints to illustrated pocket identification guides, as well as a range of curriculum resources for teachers.

== Activities ==
The Society's Mission Statement is to 'promote Fungal Science Internationally' with the objectives to:

1. Encourage those interested in fungi and related organisms to join the Society and to take part in our events, whether in a professional or amateur capacity.
2. Promote the recognition of fungal science in the UK and internationally.
3. Support and grow the key areas of Society activities to promote further understanding of fungal science and to inspire future generations of mycologists.
4. Support the Society's academic publications and other resources on fungal biology for the international community.
5. Organise conferences, workshops and other activities supporting mycology.
6. Promote networking across the fungal science community and maintain strong links with other relevant national and international learned societies and organisations.
7. Ensure the Society's resources are utilised effectively to further fungal science.

== Presidents ==
- 1896–98 George Edward Massee (1845–1917)
- 1899–1900 Charles Bagge Plowright (1849–1910)
- 1900–01 Harry Marshall Ward (1854–1906)
- 1902–03 James William Helenus Trail (1851–1919)
- 1903–04 William Leigh Williamson Eyre (1841–1914)
- 1904–05 Worthington G. Smith (1866–1928)
- 1905–06 Sir Rowland Henry Biffen (1874–1949)
- 1906–07 Arthur Lister (1830–1908)
- 1907–08 Annie Lorrain Smith (1854–1937)
- 1908–09 Carleton Rea (1861–1946)
- 1909–10 Michael Cressé Potter (1858–1948)
- 1910–11 Harold Wager (1876–1951)
- 1911–12 Ernest Stanley Salmon (1871–1959)
- 1912–13 Gulielma Lister (1860–1949)
- 1913–14 Arthur Disbrowe Cotton (1879–1962)
- 1914–15 Arthur Henry Reginald Buller (1879–1944)
- 1915–16 Emma Amy Rea (1865–1927)
- 1916–17 Ernest William Swanton (1870–1958)
- 1917–18 Annie Lorrain Smith (1854–1937)
- 1918–19 Rev. David Paul (1845–1929)
- 1919–20 Harold Wager (1876–1951)
- 1920–21 Thomas Petch (1870–1948)
- 1921–22 Carleton Rea (1861–1946)
- 1922–23 Frederick Thomas Brooks (1882–1952)
- 1923–24 Otto Vernon Darbishire (1870–1934)
- 1924–25 John Ramsbottom (1885–1974)
- 1925–26 William Norwood Cheesman (1847–1925)
- 1926–27 George Herbert Pethybridge (1871–1948)
- 1927–28 Edwin John Butler (1874–1943)
- 1928–29 Helen Gwynne-Vaughan (1879–1967)
- 1929–30 Elsie Maud Wakefield (1886–1972)
- 1930–31 Sir Rowland Henry Biffen (1874–1949)
- 1931–32 Arthur Anselm Pearson (1874–1954)
- 1932–33 Gulielma Lister (1860–1949)
- 1933–34 William Brown (1888–1975)
- 1934–35 Bertie Frank Barnes (1888–1965)
- 1935–36 Malcolm Wilson (1882–1960)
- 1936–37 Francis Gerald Gould (1875–1946)
- 1937–38 Kenneth St George Cartwright (1891–1964)
- 1938–39 Kathleen Sampson (1892-1980)
- 1939–40 Edmund William Mason (1890–1975)
- 1940–41 Harry Hugh Wormald (1879–1955)
- 1941–42 Walter Cecil Moore (1900–1967)
- 1942–43 Elizabeth Marianne Blackwell (1889–1973)
- 1943–44 Samuel Paul Wiltshire (1891–1967)
- 1944–45 Ralph Warren Marsh (1899–1992)
- 1945–46 George Smith (1895–1967)
- 1946–47 John Ramsbottom (1885–1974)
- 1947–48 Charles Geddes Coull Chesters (1904–1993)
- 1948–49 Arthur Edmund Muskett (1900–1984)
- 1949–50 Walter Philip Kennedy Findlay (1904–1985)
- 1950–51 Geoffrey Clough Ainsworth (1905–1998)
- 1951–52 Philip Herries Gregory (1907–1986)
- 1952–53 Arthur Anselm Pearson (1874–1954)
- 1953–54 Cecil Terence Ingold (1905–2010)
- 1954–55 Stephen Denis Garrett (1906–1989)
- 1955–56 Lilian Edith Hawker (1908–1991)
- 1956–57 William Douglas Graddon (1896–1989)
- 1957–58 Clarence James Hickman (1914–1980)
- 1958–59 Frederick Bayard Hora (1908–1984)
- 1959–60 Percy Wragg Brian (1910–1979)
- 1960–61 Ernest Charles Large (1902–1976)
- 1961–62 Grace Marion Waterhouse (1906–1996)
- 1962–63 Norman Alan Burges (1911–2002)
- 1963–64 John Colhoun (1913–2002)
- 1964–65 Noel Farnie Robertson (1923–1999)
- 1965–66 Percy Wragg Brian (1910–1979)
- 1966–67 Harold Eli Croxall (1914–1986)
- 1967–68 John Laker Harley (1911–1990)
- 1968–69 Prof. John G. Manners
- 1969–70 John Webster (1925–2014)
- 1970–71 Stephen Angus Hutchinson (1914–2005)
- 1971–72 Cecil Terence Ingold (1905–2010)
- 1972–73 John Malcolm Hirst (1921–1997)
- 1973–74 Martin Beazor Ellis (1911–1996)
- 1974–75 Richard C. F. Macer (b.1928)
- 1975–76 Douglas Mackay Henderson (1927–2007)
- 1976–77 R. L. Lucas
- 1977–78 Colin Booth (1924–2003)
- 1978–79 Joan Moore (1920–1986)
- 1979–80 Geoffrey John Frederick Pugh (1924–2006)
- 1980–81 Sir David Cecil Smith (1930–2018)
- 1981–82 Robert J. W. Byrde (1922–2010)
- 1982–83 John Harrison Burnett (1922–2007)
- 1983–84 Michael Francis Madelin (1931–2007)
- 1984–85 George Frederick Pegg (b.1930)
- 1985–86 Brian Charles Sutton (b.1938)
- 1986–87 David Harry Jennings (b.1932)
- 1987–88 Roy Watling (b.1938)
- 1988–89 John Frederick Peberdy (1937–2020)
- 1989–90 David H. Lewis
- 1990–91 David Leslie Hawksworth (b.1946)
- 1991–92 Anthony Peter Joseph Trinci (1936–2020)
- 1992–93 Evan Benjamin Gareth Jones (b.1937)
- 1993–94 Graham William Gooday (1942–2001)
- 1994–95 Anthony J. S. Whalley (b.1943)
- 1995–96 Juliet Frankland (1929–2013)
- 1996–97 John Webster (1925–2014)
- 1997–98 David Moore (b.1942)
- 1998–99 Alan D. M. Rayner (b.1950)
- 1999–2000 Stefan Buczacki (b.1945)
- 2001–02 Stephen Thomas Moss (1943–2001)
- 2003–04 Neil Andrew Robert Gow (b.1957)
- 2004–07 Geoffrey Michael Gadd (b.1954)
- 2007–08 Nicholas J.W. Clipson (b.1958)
- 2009–10 Lynne Boddy (b.1955)
- 2011–12 Naresh Magan (b.1953)
- 2013–14 Geoffrey David Robson (1962–2019)
- 2015–16 Nick Read (1954–2020)
- 2017–18 Pieter van West (b.1969)
- 2019–20 Simon Vincent Avery (b.1966)
- 2021–present Janet Quinn (b.1969)

== See also ==
- Société mycologique de France
- Mycological Society of America
- New York Mycological Society
