= John Colhoun (plant pathologist) =

British botanist and plant pathologist (1913–2002)

John Colhoun FLS (born 15 May 1913 in Castlederg, County Tyrone, Northern Ireland – 5 January 2002 in Stockport, Cheshire, England) was a British mycologist, phytopathologist, and professor of cryptogamic botany. For a one-year term from 1963 to 1964 he was the president of the British Mycological Society.

== Life ==
Born into a farming family, John Colhoun preferred an academic approach to agriculture. In 1930 he matriculated at Queen's University Belfast (QUB). There he graduated in 1933 with a BSc in botany, in 1934 with a degree in agricultural botany with first class honours, and in 1937 with an M.Agr. in mycology and plant pathology. His M.Agr. thesis is entitled Biological Studies on the Apple Fruit Crop. Supported by research assistantships at QUB and at the Ministry of Agriculture for Northern Ireland, he did research from 1934 to 1940 at Imperial College London and at QUB. The research concerned how nutrition and nitrogen content are related to the growth of fungal pathogens that damage apples. Colhoun's research lead in 1940 to his PhD from Imperial College London.

Colhoun held an appointment from 1938 to 1940 as assistant lecturer in QUB's department of agricultural botany and from 1940 to 1954 as assistant lecturer in both the department of agricultural botany and the department of mycology and plant pathology. From 1939 to 1960 he held a concurrent post in the Plant Pathology Division of the Ministry of Agriculture of Northern Ireland. In 1954 he was appointed a reader at QUB. During the 1940s, he collaborated with Arthur Edmund Muskett on diseases of flax, which during WW II was an economically important crop in Northern Ireland. During the 1950s Colhoun did research on the clubroot pathogen infecting plants of the family Brassicaceae. During his early years at QUB, he made frequent radio appearances giving information on plant pathology to listeners interested in gardening. At QUB he did research on fungal physiology and how plant diseases can be influenced by plant environment. He studied the control of the diseases of economically important plants and worked with geneticists in a programme to breed disease-resistant plants.

In 1960 Colhoun moved, with his family, to England when he was appointed to the University of Manchester's professorial chair of cryptogamic botany. His predecessor in the chair was Claude Wardlaw. Colhoun held his professorial appointment until 1980 when he retired as professor emeritus.

William Brown (1888–1975) was the doctoral advisor of Colhoun, who received both PhD and D.Sc. from Imperial College London. There a tribute in July 1968 honoured Brown during the First International Congress of Plant Pathology. On the 20th of July, the Federation of British Plant Pathologists gave a reception for all the members of the congress. At the reception, Colhoun, the president of the federation and acting in its behalf, made a presentation to Brown.

During the 20 years of Colhoun's professorship in Manchester, he or his colleagues trained over 70 postdoctoral students in phytopathology. At the University of Manchester, he did research on plant pathogens in the genera Fusarium, Phytophthora, Septoria, and Phoma and diseases of economically important plant species, including cereals, chrysanthemum, yam, oil palm, and banana. Overseas governments invited him to provide expert advice on vascular wilt disease. During his overseas trips he became familiar with diseases of date palms in Algeria and of oil palms in Nigeria. His familiarity with such diseases led to the creation of northern England's hottest and brightest glasshouses.

He travelled in the UK and abroad photographing and recording historic gardens and gave many lectures on such gardens. He belonged to three London clubs: Athenaeum, Authors', and Farmers.

Colhoun married in 1949. He and his wife Margaret (1921–1997) had three daughters, the eldest of whom died in 1997 shortly before Margaret died. Upon his death in 2002, he was survived by two daughters.

== Selected publications ==
=== Articles ===
- Muskett, A. E.; Colhoun, J. (1940). "Prevention of Seedling Blight in the Flax Crop". Nature. 146 (3688): 32. Bibcode:1940Natur.146...32M. doi:10.1038/146032b0. S2CID 4122944.
- Muskett, A. E.; Colhoun, J. (1941). "Prevention of Stem-Break, Browning and Seedling Blight in the Flax Crop". Nature. 147 (3719): 176–177. Bibcode:1941Natur.147..176M. doi:10.1038/147176b0. S2CID 4104553.
- Colhoun, John (1944). "Grey Mould (Botrytis cinerea) cf Flax". Nature. 153 (3870): 25–26. Bibcode:1944Natur.153...25C. doi:10.1038/153025b0. S2CID 4091423.
- Muskett, A. E.; Colhoun, J. (1945). "Foot Rot (Phoma sp.) of Flax". Nature. 155 (3934): 367–368. Bibcode:1945Natur.155..367M. doi:10.1038/155367a0. S2CID 4077476.
- Colhoun, John (1952). "Factors affecting the incidence of club root disease of Brassicae". Nature. 169 (4288): 21–22. Bibcode:1952Natur.169...21C. doi:10.1038/169021a0. PMID 14910674. S2CID 4185872.
- Colhoun, John (1953). "A Study of the Epidemiology of Club-Root Disease of Brassicae". Annals of Applied Biology. 40 (2): 262–283. doi:10.1111/j.1744-7348.1953.tb01081.x.
- Colhoun, John (1957). "A Technique for Examining Soil for the Presence of Plasmodiophora brassicae Woron". Annals of Applied Biology. 45 (3): 559–565. doi:10.1111/j.1744-7348.1957.tb05895.x.
- Colhoun, J.; Taylor, G. S.; Millar, C. S. (1963). "Disease of cereals caused by Fusarium nivale". Nature. 200 (4906): 597. Bibcode:1963Natur.200..597C. doi:10.1038/200597a0. S2CID 4256691.
- Colhoun, J.; Park, D. (1964). "Fusarium diseases of cereals". Transactions of the British Mycological Society. 47 (4): 559–572. doi:10.1016/S0007-1536(64)80035-8.
- Warren, R.C.; King, J.E.; Colhoun, J. (1971). "Reaction of potato leaves to infection by Phytophthora infestans in relation to position on the plant". Transactions of the British Mycological Society. 57 (3): 501–514. doi:10.1016/S0007-1536(71)80065-7.
- Malalasekera, R.A.P.; Sanderson, F.R.; Colhoun, J. (1973). "Fusarium diseases of cereals". Transactions of the British Mycological Society. 60 (3): 453–462. doi:10.1016/S0007-1536(73)80030-0.
- Holmes, S.J.I.; Colhoun, J. (1974). "Infection of wheat by Septoria nodorum and S. tritici in relation to plant age, air temperature and relative humidity". Transactions of the British Mycological Society. 63 (2): 329–338. doi:10.1016/S0007-1536(74)80178-6.
- Warren, R.C.; Colhoun, J. (1975). "Viability of sporangia of Phytophthora infestans in relation to drying". Transactions of the British Mycological Society. 64: 73–78. doi:10.1016/S0007-1536(75)80077-5.
- Horsfall, James G.; Cowling, Ellis B., eds. (2 December 2012). "Chapter 2. The Evolution of Parasitic Fitness by John Colhoun". Plant Disease: An Advanced Treatise: How Pathogens Induce Disease. Academic Press. pp. 23–46. ISBN 9780323148405. (1st edition 1979)
- Pittis, J. E.; Colhoun, J. (1984). "Isolation and Identification of Pythiaceous Fungi from Irrigation Water and their Pathogenicity to Antirrhinum, Tomato and Chamaecyparis lawsoniana". Journal of Phytopathology. 110 (4): 301–318. doi:10.1111/j.1439-0434.1984.tb00070.x.

=== Monographs ===
- Muskett, Arthur E.; Colhoun, John (1947). The Diseases of the Flax Plant (Linum usitatissimum Linn.). Belfast: The Bursar, Queen's University. pp. 112 pages. ASIN B001SK9ZTI.
- Colhoun, J. (1958). Club root disease of crucifers caused by Plasmodiophora brassicae Woron. A Monograph. Phytopathological Paper, No. 3. Kew, Surrey, England: Commonwealth Mycological Institute. pp. vi+108 pages, 4 plates. OL 16591937M.
