= Fungal Biology =

Scientific journal on mycological research

- Discipline: Mycology
- Language: English
- Edited by: Simon Avery, Geoff Gadd, Nicholas Money

Publication details
- Former name(s): Mycological Research, Transactions of the British Mycological Society
- History: 1896–present
- Publisher: Elsevier, on behalf of the British Mycological Society (England)
- Frequency: Monthly
- Impact factor: 2.910 (2021)

Standard abbreviations
- ISO 4: Fungal Biol.

Indexing
- Fungal Biology
- ISSN: 1878-6146
- OCLC no.: 506264346
- Mycological Research
- ISSN: 0953-7562
- Transactions of the British Mycological Society
- ISSN: 0007-1536

Links
- Journal homepage; Online access

Fungal Biology is a scientific journal that publishes peer-reviewed papers on all aspects of basic and applied research of the fungi, including lichens, yeasts, oomycetes, and slime moulds. A publication of the British Mycological Society, it was founded in 1896 as Transactions of the British Mycological Society (1896–1989) and was later titled Mycological Research (1989–2010). The founding editor was Carleton Rea (1896–1930).

== History ==
The journal was established in 1896 under the title Transactions of the British Mycological Society. The founding editor was Carleton Rea, who continued in the role until 1930. Rea was the sole editor until 1919, when he was joined by John Ramsbottom; subsequently there were two or three editors until 1967 when the group was expanded under a Senior Editor. The earliest issues contained reports on fungus-collecting expeditions and the first British sightings of fungal species; later, research papers and reviews were also published. The journal was initially printed by Ebenezer Baylis & Son in Worcester; in 1919, the publisher changed to Cambridge University Press.

The editors until 1967 were:

- Carleton Rea (1896–1930)
- John Ramsbottom (1919–1942)
- H. Wormald (1931–1945)
- B. Barnes (1931–1949)
- W. C. Moore (1946–1952)
- P. H. Gregory (1950–1955)
- G. C. Ainsworth (1953–1958)
- S. D. Garrett (1956–1961)
- G. M. Waterhouse (1959–1964)
- J. G. Manners (1962–1967)
- J. M. Waterston (1965–1970).

The journal changed its name to Mycological Research in 1989. Brian C. Sutton, one of the editors of Transactions since 1970, became the first Senior Editor of Mycological Research, remaining in the position until at least 1997. Its frequency was quarterly, increasing to monthly by 1997, when it was still being published by Cambridge University Press. It obtained its current title in 2010.
