= YNU =

YNU may refer to:

- Yokohama National University
- Yorkshire Naturalists' Union
- Yunnan University
