= Elizabeth Blackwell (disambiguation) =

Elizabeth Blackwell (1821–1910) was a British physician.

Elizabeth Blackwell may also refer to:

- Elizabeth Blackwell (illustrator) (1707–1758), Scottish botanical illustrator
- Elizabeth Marianne Blackwell (1889–1973), English botanist and mycologist
