= Robert J. W. Byrde =

English mycologist and phytopathologist

Robert Jocelyn Walter Byrde (31 July 1922, Bournemouth – 8 May 2010, Wells, Somerset) was an English mycologist and phytopathologist. He was the president of the British Mycological Society for the academic year 1981–1982. He is known for his research, in collaboration with Anthony H. Fielding, on the role of pectolyic enzymes in physiological phytopathology. This research was a forerunner of many of the developments in molecular phytopathology.

== Biography ==
Byrde grew up near Stroud, where he attended Wycliffe College, Gloucestershire. He matriculated in 1942 at the University of Reading, where he graduated in 1944 with a B.Sc. in horticulture. After graduation, he served in the Royal Electrical and Mechanical Engineers. He saw military action in support of heavy anti-aircraft artillery, attained the rank of captain, and served in India. In 1947 he returned to the University of Reading as a graduate student under the supervision of Raymond Henry Stoughton. Within one year Byrde moved to Long Ashton Research Station, which was part of the University of Bristol. At the research station, he completed his doctoral studies for his Ph.D. His research was published with the title Experiments on the control of Brown Rot of Apple and Plum. Much of his career was spent in the study of fungal causes of fruit rots and how orchard growers can cope with fruit rots. In 1950 he became a staff member of Long Ashton Research Station, where he spent almost the entirety of his career. Initially he worked with Ralph Warren Marsh, who was a valuable mentor for Byrde.

In the early part of his career, Byrde did important research on using fungicides to control fruit diseases, such as apple scab, powdery mildew, cankers caused by fungi, and brown rots caused by Monilinia fructicola. In 1965 he became the head of Long Ashton's phytopathology section, as the successor to R. W. Marsh. By 1975 Byrde was appointed to a readership at the University of Bristol. Towards the end of his career he visited India as a consultant in phytopathology.

In 2004 the British Society for Plant Pathology made him an Honorary Member.

Robert Byrde's wife Joyce died in 2002. Upon his death in 2010 he was survived by his daughter Rosemary.

== Selected publications ==
- Byrde, R. J. W.; Woodcock, D. (1952). "Fungicides and Phytotoxicity". Nature. 169 (4299): 503–504. Bibcode:1952Natur.169..503B. doi:10.1038/169503b0. S2CID 4194124.
- Byrde, R. J. W.; Martin, J. T.; Nicholas, D. J. D. (1956). "Effect of Fungicides on Fungus Enzymes". Nature. 178 (4534): 638–639. Bibcode:1956Natur.178..638B. doi:10.1038/178638b0. PMID 13369487. S2CID 4223750.
- Byrde, R. J. W.; Woodcock, D. (1957). "Effect of the Interaction between Chelating Agents on their Fungitoxicity". Nature. 179 (4558): 539. Bibcode:1957Natur.179..539B. doi:10.1038/179539a0. S2CID 4183631.
- Byrde, R. J. W.; Fielding, A. H. (1962). "Resolution of Endopolygalacturonase and a Macerating Factor in a Fungal Culture Filtrate". Nature. 196 (4860): 1227–1228. Bibcode:1962Natur.196.1227B. doi:10.1038/1961227a0. S2CID 4277433.
- Byrde, R. J. W.; Fielding, A. H. (1965). "An Extracellular α-L-Arabinofuranosidase secreted by Sclerotinia fructigena". Nature. 205 (4969): 390–391. Bibcode:1965Natur.205..390B. doi:10.1038/205390b0. PMID 14243421. S2CID 4218814.
- Byrde, R. J. W.; Fielding, A. H. (1968). "Pectin Methyl-trans-eliminase as the Maceration Factor of Sclerotinia fructigena and Its Significance in Brown Rot of Apple". Journal of General Microbiology. 52 (2): 287–297. doi:10.1099/00221287-52-2-287.
- Calonge, F. D.; Fielding, A. H.; Byrde, R. J. W. (1969). "Multivesicular Bodies in Sclerotinia fructigena and their Possible Relation to Extracellular Enzyme Secretion". Journal of General Microbiology. 55 (2): 177–184. doi:10.1099/00221287-55-2-177. PMID 5764731.
- Laborda, F.; Fielding, A. H.; Byrde, R. J. W. (1973). "Extra- and Intra-cellular -L-Arabinofuranosidase of Sclerotinia fructigena". Journal of General Microbiology. 79 (2): 321–329. doi:10.1099/00221287-79-2-321.
- Willetts, H. J.; Byrde, R. J. W.; Fielding, A. H.; Wong, A.-L. (1977). "The Taxonomy of the Brown Rot Fungi (Monilinia spp.) Related to their Extracellular Cell Wall-degrading Enzymes". Journal of General Microbiology. 103: 77–83. doi:10.1099/00221287-103-1-77.
- Wijesundera, R. L. C.; Bailey, J. A.; Byrde, R. J. W. (1984). "Production of Pectin Lyase by Colletotrichum lindemuthianum in Culture and in Infected Bean (Phaseolus vulgaris) Tissue". Microbiology. 130 (2): 285–290. doi:10.1099/00221287-130-2-285.
- Daniels, M.J.; Barber, C.E.; Turner, P.C.; Sawczyc, M.K.; Byrde, R.J.W.; Fielding, A.H. (1984). "Cloning of genes involved in pathogenicity of Xanthomonas campestris pv. campestris using the broad host range cosmid pLAFR1". The EMBO Journal. 3 (13): 3323–3328. doi:10.1002/j.1460-2075.1984.tb02298.x. PMC 557857. PMID 16453595.
- Pegg, G. F.; Ayres, P. G., eds. (1987). "Chapter 7. Some aspects of fungal enzymes that degrade plant cell walls by J. P. R. Keon, R. J. W. Byrde, and R. M. Cooper". Fungal Infection of Plants: Symposium of the British Mycological Society. Cambridge University Press. pp. 133–157. ISBN 9780521324571. (2011 pbk reprint of 1987 1st edition)
- Wijesundera, R.L.C.; Bailey, J.A.; Byrde, R.J.W.; Fielding, A.H. (1989). "Cell wall degrading enzymes of Colletotrichum lindemuthianum: Their role in the development of bean anthracnose". Physiological and Molecular Plant Pathology. 34 (5): 403–413. doi:10.1016/0885-5765(89)90067-2.

=== Books ===
- Byrde, R. J. W.; Cutting, C. V., eds. (2 December 2012). Fungal Pathogenicity and the Plant's Response. Proceeding of a Symposium held at Long Ashton Research Station, University of Bristol, 22-24 September 1971. Elsevier. ISBN 9780323147408. (2012 pbk reprint of 1973 1st edition)
- Byrde, R. J. W.; Willetts, Haydn J. (22 October 2013). The Brown Rot Fungi of Fruit: Their Biology and Control. Elsevier. ISBN 9781483151892. (2013 reprint of 1977 1st edition)
