= Yorkshire Naturalists' Union =

United Kingdom association of naturalists

The Yorkshire Naturalists' Union is an association of amateur and professional naturalists covering a wide range of aspects of natural history. It is one of United Kingdom's oldest extant wildlife organisations and oldest natural history federation. Its Mycological Committee, founded in 1892, is the oldest permanent organisation dedicated to the study of fungi in Great Britain.

== History ==
The Yorkshire Naturalists' Union was founded in 1861 as the West Riding Consolidated Naturalists' Society. Initially a collaboration of five local natural history field clubs, additional clubs and societies from across Yorkshire continued to join. The association renamed itself the Yorkshire Naturalists' Union in 1876.

== Activities ==
The Yorkshire Naturalists' Union organises joint field trips, co-operates with the British Association for the Advancement of Science and other county-sized associations, and publishes a journal, The Naturalist. The journal was first published by the Yorkshire Naturalists' Union in August 1878.

== Notable members ==
- William Sawney Bisat(1886–1973), geologist
- Frederick Orpen Bower (1855–1948), botanist
- Margaret E. Bradshaw (1926-), botanist and conservationist
- William Norwood Cheesman (1847–1925), mycologist
- Alfred Clarke (1848–1925), mycologist and photographer
- William Eagle Clarke (1853–1938), ornithologist
- William James Clarke (1871–1945), naturalist and folklorist
- Eva Crackles (1918-2007) Botanist and teacher
- Charles Crossland (1844–1916), mycologist and ecologist
- James William Davis (1846–1893), geologist
- John Farrah (1849–1907), botanist and meteorologist
- Percy H. Grimshaw (1869–1939), entomologist and zoogeographer
- Henry Bendelack Hewetson (1850–1899), ornithologist
- William Walsham How (1823–1897), botanist and Bishop of Wakefield
- Edmund William Mason (1890–1975), mycologist
- George Edward Massee (1845–1917), mycologist
- Seth Lister Mosley (1847–1829), ornithologist and museum curator
- James Needham (1849–1913), mycologist and ecologist
- Arthur Anselm Pearson (1874–1954), mycologist
- George Taylor Porritt (1848–1927), entomologist
- Lorna I. Scott (1895–1984), botanist
- Albert Seward (1863–1941), botanist and geologist. Professor of Botany, Cambridge University from 1906 to 1936
- Henry Thomas Soppitt (1858–1899), mycologist
- James Varley (1817–1883), ornithologist and entomologist
- Harold Wager (1862–1929), mycologist
- Roy Watling (b. 1938), mycologist
- Thomas William Woodhead (1863–1940), plant ecologist
