= Seth Lister Mosley =

English naturalist, ornithologist and curator

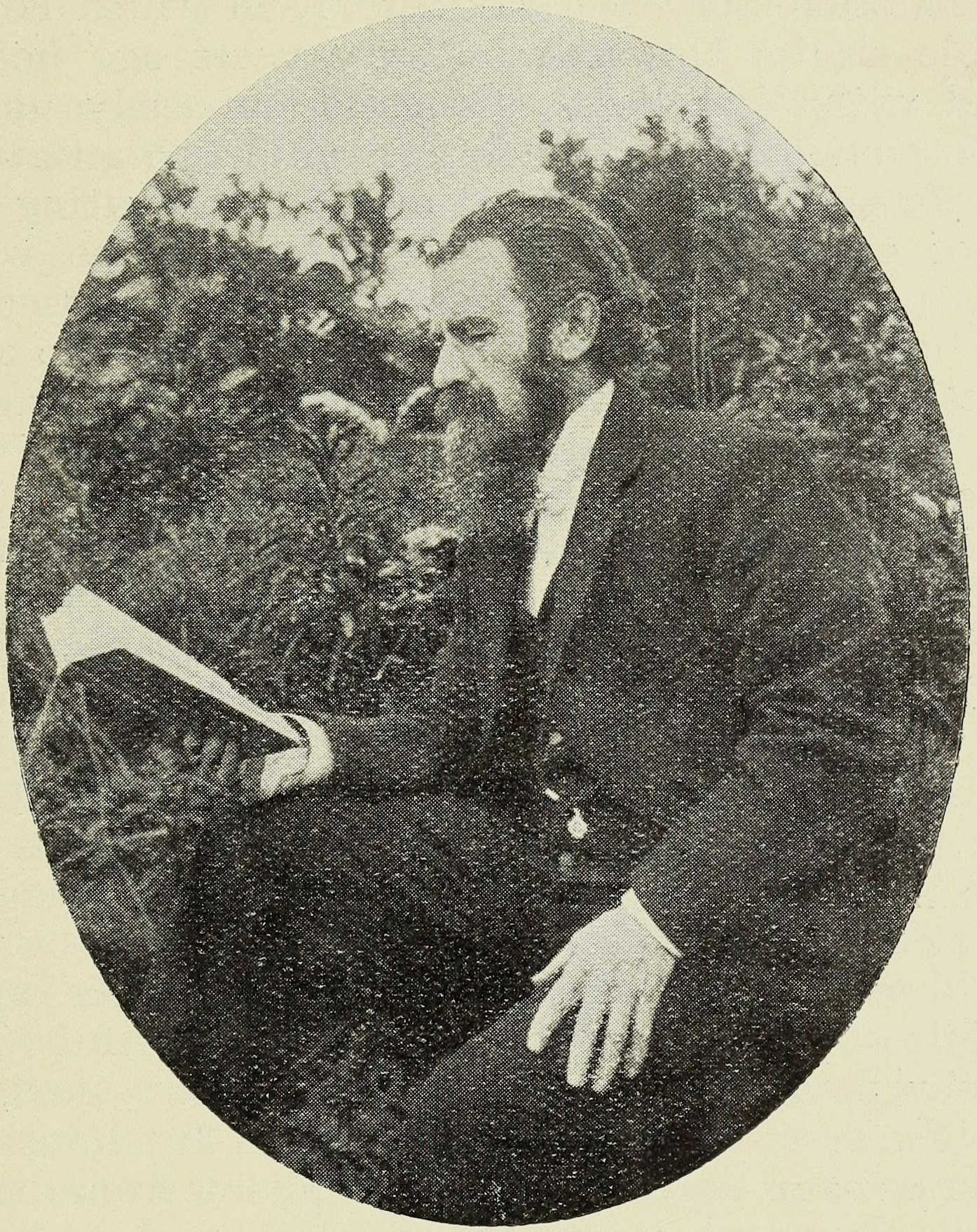
- Mosley in 1864
- Born: 1848
- Died: 1929 (aged 80-81)
- Known for: Contributions to ornithology, publishing, and museology
- Scientific career
- Fields: Natural History

Seth Lister Mosley FES (1848–1929) was an English naturalist, ornithologist and curator who lived in Huddersfield, West Yorkshire. Born into a working-class family, he had little in the way of formal education.

== Career ==
He initially worked as a painter-decorator before becoming an independent professional naturalist in 1877, going on to become one of the most prominent British naturalists in the late nineteenth century. He was an early advocate for bird conservation and wrote publicly against the shooting of birds for museum displays.

He was one of Britain's first independent museologists and visited a substantial number of museums across the country (including the Natural History Museum, London, observing their natural history collections, and providing educational resources. He was also a lecturer for the National Secular Society.

He ran several private museums in Huddersfield before being appointed curator of the collections at Huddersfield Technical College. He was appointed the Soppitt Curator by the Yorkshire Naturalists' Union following the death of Henry Thomas Soppitt in 1899. and became the first curator at Huddersfield's Tolson Museum in 1922.

== Publications ==
He was also the editor and primary contributor of several prominent national popular science publications including The Naturalist's Journal and theYoung Naturalist.

== Legacy ==
In 2022, a book was published on entitled Nature’s Missionary: Seth Lister Mosley – Naturalist, Museum Curator And Mystic. Written by the Huddersfield historian Alan Brooke, the book marked the first major academic work on Seth Lister Mosley. The book was long-listed for the 2024 SHNH Natural History Book Prize (John Thackray Medal).

A children's book based on his life, entitled The Boy who Dreamt a Museum, was also published.
