= Elizabeth Marianne Blackwell =

British botanist and mycologist (1889–1973)

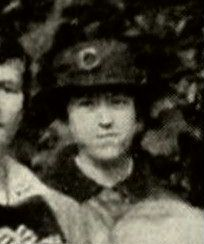

Elizabeth "Elsie" Marianne Blackwell FLS (8 January 1889 – 25 May 1973) was an English botanist and mycologist, known as an expert on Phytophthora. She was the president of the British Mycological Society for a one-year term from 1942 to 1943.

== Education and career ==
Blackwell completed her secondary education at Southport High School for Girls. At the University of Liverpool, she graduated in 1910 with a BSc in botany and zoology, in 1911 with a first class honours BSc in botany, and in 1912 with an MSc in botany. At the University of Liverpool she was appointed in 1912 a demonstrator in botany and in 1913 an assistant lecturer in botany, holding that appointment until 1922. In October 1920 she was granted an academic leave of absence to study with J. Bretland Farmer at the Huxley Laboratory for Biological Research at Imperial College London, where she began her study of Phytophthora. She also established friendships with Annie Lorrain Smith, Gulielma Lister, Arthur Anselm Pearson, and other noteworthy mycologists. After two terms, Blackwell was recalled to the University of Liverpool, but she did continue her studies at Imperial College London in the summers of 1921 and 1922.

Blackwell was elected in 1922 a Fellow of the Linnean Society of London. At Royal Holloway College (now called Royal Holloway, University of London), she was a professor and head of the botany department from 1922 to 1949, when she retired as professor emeritus. She wrote many articles for The Naturalist, published by the Yorkshire Naturalists' Union, and The Countryman.

== Selected publications ==
=== Articles ===
- Blackwell, Elsie M. (1914). "Preliminary Note on Occurrence of Stomata in Hypogeal Cotyledons". Annals of Botany (3): 545–546. doi:10.1093/oxfordjournals.aob.a089522.
- Blackwell, E.M.; Waterhouse, G.M. (1931). "Spores and spore germination in the genus Phytophthora". Transactions of the British Mycological Society. 15 (3–4): 294–310. doi:10.1016/S0007-1536(31)80015-4.
- Blackwell, E.M.; Waterhouse, G.M.; Thompson, M.V. (1941). "The invalidity of the genus Pythiomorpha". Transactions of the British Mycological Society. 25 (2): 148–165. doi:10.1016/S0007-1536(41)80003-5.
- Blackwell, E. M.; Waterhouse, G. M. (1941). "Water Moulds as a Source of Infection by Pathogenic Species of Phytophthora". Mycologia: 449. doi:10.1080/00275514.1941.12020838.
- Blackwell, Elizabeth M. (1953). "Haustoria of Phytophthora infestans and some other species". Transactions of the British Mycological Society. 36 (2): 138–IN5. doi:10.1016/S0007-1536(53)80058-6.
- Blackwell, E. M. (1961). "Fungus forays in Yorkshire and the history of the Mycological Committee". The Naturalist. 86 (871): 163–168.
