= James Needham =

James Needham may refer to:

- James Needham (mycologist) (1849–1913), English mycologist
- James C. Needham (1864–1942), American politician
- James George Needham (1868–1957), American entomologist
