= John Webster (mycologist) =

British mycologist (1925–2014)

John Webster (25 May 1925 – 27 December 2014) was an internationally renowned mycologist and head of biological sciences at the University of Exeter in England. He also served twice as president of the British Mycological Society. He is recognised for determining the physiological mechanism underpinning fungal spore release, though is probably best known by students of mycology for his influential textbook, Introduction to Fungi.

== Early life ==
Born in Kirkby-in-Ashfield in Nottinghamshire, John Webster, along with his twin brother, was the youngest of four children. He studied for his degree at the University of Nottingham between 1943 and 1945. After gaining a first class honours degree, he moved to Hull University in 1946 to become assistant lecturer. There he married his wife, Brom, in 1950. They had two children. He then went to the University of Sheffield to embark on his PhD (on the microfungi associated with the grass Dactylis glomerata), which he completed in 1954. He was subsequently appointed as senior lecturer, and ultimately reader, in A. R. Clapham's Botany Department there. In 1969 he was appointed professor and head of department in the School of Biological Sciences at the University of Exeter, where he remained until his retirement in 1990. Webster's early interests centred on the study of fungi on grasses, though by the 1970s he focused his attentions on aquatic hyphomycetes.

== Contributions to mycology ==
Webster helped organise the first International Mycological Congress, which was held at Exeter University in September 1971. He acted as its secretary, with G.C.Ainsworth as chairman of the organising committee and C.T.Ingold as its president. The Exeter congress led directly to the formation of the International Mycological Association.

Webster also served two terms as president of the British Mycological Society, firstly in 1969, then again in its centenary year in 1996.

As an educator, John Webster's undergraduate teaching classes introduced many students to the world of fungi, some of whom went on to become leading mycologists or academics in their own right, including Lynne Boddy, Alan Rayner, Naresh Magan (all past presidents of the British Mycological Society) and Nick Talbot. His classic textbook book, Introduction to Fungi was first published in 1970, with every illustration drawn by him from live specimens. The book ran to three editions, the second appearing in 1979 and the third in 2007.

Webster's greatest contribution to the science of mycology was in determining the mechanism for fungal spore discharge in basidiomycetes using high-speed video microscopy, which he and his team at Exeter University perfected in the 1980s. His elegant elucidation of the role of Buller's drop in basidiospore discharge is regarded as a classic. The mechanism was demonstrated to be a surface-tension catapult, originally suggested in 1922 by A.H.R.Buller, and by C.T.Ingold in 1939.

John Webster authored over 250 scientific publications during his career, which were summarised in 2005 by D.L.Hawksworth.

== Honours and recognition ==
In 1987 Webster was made a Corresponding Member of the Mycological Society of America. He served as the International Mycological Association's third president from 1983 to 1990, and was then made honorary president for life in 1990. In 1996 the association awarded him their Ainsworth Medal in recognition of his "extraordinary service to world mycology".

In 2011 the British Mycological Society conferred on John Webster their President's Award in recognition of his broad contributions to mycology and to the society over many decades.

== Selected publications ==
- Webster, J. (1970) Introduction to Fungi
- Webster, J. & Weber, R. (2007) Introduction to Fungi

== See also ==
- List of mycologists
