= Grace Waterhouse =

British mycologist (1906–1996)

Grace Marion Waterhouse
- Born: 23 July 1906; Southwest London, England
- Died: 9 May 1996 (aged 89)
- Occupation: Mycologist

Grace Marion Waterhouse (23 July 1906 – 9 May 1996) was a British mycologist who worked for the International Mycological Institute in Kew for 20 years. She was an expert on the identification and taxonomy of Phytophthora plant pathogens. She gathered a large collection of Phytophthora cultures, and published two seminal works on the genus: a key to the species and a compilation of species descriptions.

== Early life and education ==
Grace Waterhouse was born in South West London in 1906 to Bertram and Jane Waterhouse and was the youngest of three children. She had two brothers. She attended the Royal Holloway, University of London from 1924 to 1927 where she studied botany. After graduation, she worked in the Botany Department of Royal Holloway College for 12 years. Waterhouse was a student and collaborator of mycologist Elizabeth Marianne Blackwell (1889-1973); through her she became interested in the Phytophthora. In 1939, Waterhouse was awarded a Master's degree for her work on them. From 1937 to 1941, she studied zoology at Birkbeck College. In 1983, the University of London awarded her a doctorate in science.

== Career ==
Waterhouse started her career as a teacher at Eastbourne in 1942. She later took a teaching position at Lincoln Training College. In 1945, she returned to Royal Holloway College to continue to work on Phytophthora. In 1946, Waterhouse joined the International Mycological Institute where she worked until her retirement.

While at the International Mycological Institute, Waterhouse replaced Geoffrey Clough Ainsworth as the assistant editor of the Review of Applied Mycology, a journal dedicated to abstracting world literature on plant diseases. She was also given the responsibility of identifying samples of plant pathogens belonging to the phycomycetes, which included Phytophthora. One of the challenges she faced was a lack of keys that would allow for reliable identification of the species in these groups. She therefore wrote and published seminal keys to the genera Phythophthora, Sclerospora, Pythium, and Entomophthora.

In addition to working at the International Mycological Institute, Waterhouse was a member of the British Mycological Society, the Lincolnshire Naturalists' Union, and the Mycological Society of America. She was the editor of the journal Transactions of the British Mycological Society from 1959 to 1965 and served as the president of the British Mycological Society in 1961. She served as the president of the Lincolnshire Naturalist's Union in 1956.

== Select publications ==
- Waterhouse, G. M. 1963. Key to the species of Phytophthora de Bary. Mycol. Pap. 92.
- Waterhouse, G. M. 1964. The genus Sclerospora. Diagnoses (or descriptions) from the original papers and a key. Commonw. Mycol. Inst. Misc. Publ. 17.
- Waterhouse, G. M. 1968. The genus Pythium Pringsheim. Diagnoses (or descriptions) from original papers. Mycol. Pap. 110.
- Waterhouse, G. M. 1970. The genus Phytophthora. Diagnoses (or descriptions) and figures from the original papers. Mycol. Pap. 22.

== Personal life ==
Waterhouse enjoyed field hockey, tennis, and skiing. She was on the tennis team in college and started skiing in her 50s. She enjoyed music and sang in several choirs and frequently visited Glyndebourne. She also enjoyed folk dancing, beekeeping, and detective novels. She was a dedicated Christian.

== Death and legacy ==
Waterhouse died from a stroke in 1996. Her keys, collections, and cultures are still in use by researchers around the world.
