= P. D. Orton =

English mycologist (1916–2005)

Peter Darbishire Orton
- Born: 28 January 1916; Plymouth, Devon
- Died: 28 April 2005 (aged 89)
- Known for: Contributions to taxonomic mycology
- Scientific career
- Fields: Mycology
- Author abbrev. (botany): P.D.Orton

Peter Darbishire Orton (28 January 1916 – 7 April 2005) was an English mycologist, specialising in agarics.

== Background and education ==
Peter Darbishire Orton was born in Plymouth, the son of marine scientist, J.H. Orton; he was educated at Oundle School and Trinity College, Cambridge, where he read Natural Sciences, Music and History, receiving his degree in 1937. He then studied at the Royal College of Music, interrupted by wartime service in the Royal Artillery. On completing his studies, Orton obtained a position as a music teacher at Epsom College in Surrey.

== Researches in mycology ==
P.D. Orton became interested in fungi through fellow amateur A.A. Pearson, who was also a keen musician. Specializing, like Pearson, in agarics, Orton developed considerable expertise in identifying species and in 1955 received a Nuffield Foundation grant to work with Dr R.W.G. Dennis, head of mycology at the Royal Botanic Gardens, Kew, and F.B. Hora at Reading University on a revised checklist of British agarics and boletes. The resulting New Checklist, published in 1960, was accompanied by 300 pages of descriptive and revisionary notes by Orton entitled Notes on Genera and Species; this included new species. It remained the standard reference work for 45 years.

In 1960 Orton took up a position at the newly opened Rannoch School in Perthshire, Scotland, where he taught biology, English, and music. He remained there till he retired in 1981. During this period, he published many papers on Scottish agarics, particularly those collected on his doorstep, in the Caledonian pine woods around Rannoch. He also contributed, with Prof. Roy Watling, to the British Fungus Flora series, published by the Royal Botanic Garden, Edinburgh. He frequently visited his friend and fellow mycologist T.J. Wallace in Membury, Devon, publishing a number of new agaric species from Dawlish Warren and other Devon localities.

In 1986, he moved to Crewkerne, Somerset, where he continued to collect and publish on agarics, his last paper appearing in 1999.

Orton published extensively on British and European agarics and boletes, describing well over 100 species new to science from the British Isles. The agarics Cortinarius ortonii Moënne-Locc. & Reumaux and Entoloma ortonii Arnolds & Noordeloos are named after him. His collections are retained in the mycological herbaria at the Royal Botanic Garden, Edinburgh and the Royal Botanic Gardens, Kew.

== Selected publications ==
- Dennis, R.W.G., Orton, P.D., & Hora, F.B. (1960). New checklist of British agarics and boleti. Supplement to Transactions of the British Mycological Society
- Orton, P.D. (1960). New checklist of British agarics and boleti part III. Notes on genera and species. Transactions of the British Mycological Society 43: 159–439
- Orton, P.D. (1986). British Fungus Flora 4. Pluteaceae: Pluteus & Volvariella. Edinburgh: Royal Botanic Garden
- Orton, P.D. (1986). Fungi of northern pine and birch woods. Bulletin of the British Mycological Society 20: 130–145
- Orton, P.D. (1987). Notes on some agarics from Scotland. Notes from the Royal Botanical Garden, Edinburgh 44: 485–502.
- Orton, P.D. (1999). New and interesting agarics from Abernethy Forest, Scotland. Kew Bulletin 54: 705–714
