= Thomas William Woodhead =

British botanist (1863–1940)

- Known for: Contributions to ecology, botany, and palynology. First Director of Tolson Museum
- Scientific career
- Fields: Ecology

Thomas William Woodhead (1863–1940) was an English plant ecologist born in Holmfirth. He was an early proponent of ecology, who helped the growth of plant ecology as a discipline in England, and later became Professor of Biology at Huddersfield Technical College. He was also a pioneer of pollen analysis.

He was appointed the Soppitt Librarian by the Yorkshire Naturalists' Union after the death of Henry Thomas Soppitt in 1899 and was later the first director of the Tolson Museum, being responsible for the design and mission of the museum. He was the only British representative at the Fourth International Botanical Congress held in 1926.

== Selected publications ==
- Woodhead, T. W. (1906). Ecology of woodland plants in the neighbourhood of Huddersfield. Botanical Journal of the Linnean Society, 37(261), 333–406.
- Woodhead, T. W. (1915) The Study of Plants: An Introduction to Botany and Plant Ecology Oxford: At the Clarendon Press
- Tolson, L. and Woodhead, T. W. (1921) History of Ravensknowle & Scheme for the Development of a Local Museum Huddersfield: County Borough of Huddersfield
