= Robert Lyall Lucas =

British botanist and mycologist (1927-2009)

Robert Lyall Lucas MBE (20 February 1927, Bedford, Bedfordshire, UK – 5 January 2009, Oxford, Oxfordshire, UK) was a British mycologist, botanist, and phytopathologist. He was the president of the British Mycological Society for one year from 1976 to 1977.

== Biography ==
After secondary education at Bedford School, Lucas attended New College, Oxford, where he graduated with a B.A. in botany in 1949 and an M.A. in 1952. On 28 June 1952 he married Pamela Widdowson. He was admitted to King's College, Cambridge, where he studied fungi that infect plant roots and graduated with a Ph.D. in 1953.

At the University of Oxford, Lucas was a Demonstrator in the department of agriculture from 1952 to 1953, a University Lecturer from 1953 to 1955, and a lecturer in agriculture in New College Oxford from 1955 until his retirement in 1992. He was appointed in 1965 a Senior Research Fellow at Keble College, Oxford and in 1975 a Tutorial Fellow in biological sciences. Throughout his career, he was often consulted to identify wild fungi. Following the retirement of the Oxford chemist G. D. Parkes in 1967, Lucas served for more than 20 years as Curator of the University Parks. During his curatorship he dealt with Dutch elm disease, the Great Storm of 1987, and the abolition in 1991 of Parson's Pleasure.

Lucas chaired the University of Oxford's Delegacy for Local Examinations from 1981 to 1990. During those years he made visits to China and Trinidad as an advisor on the development of new examinations and to Oman as a consultant on the development of Sultan Qaboos University. In 1988 he administered the closing of the University of Oxford's agricultural department in its merger with the departments of forestry and plant sciences. He was in 1968–1969 one of the four Pro-Proctors who served under the Senior Proctor. Lucas served from 1971 to 1973 as Curator of the University of Oxford Botanic Garden and subsequently as Garden Master from 1984 to 1987.

In 1969 he was made MBE. In recognition of his curatorship of the University Parks, the University of Oxford created Lucas Walk in his memory.

His wife Pamela was for many years a churchwarden at the Church of St Nicholas, Old Marston. He assisted her in church affairs and was an active church member for more than 45 years. Upon his death in 2009 he was survived by his widow, their son and daughter, and five grandchildren.

== Selected publications ==
- Newbould, P.; Lucas, R. L. (1959). "Effect of the Level of Microbial Population on Isotopically Exchangeable Phosphate in Soil". Nature. 184 (4693): 1155–1156. Bibcode:1959Natur.184.1155N. doi:10.1038/1841155a0. PMID 14426779. S2CID 4266245.
- Lucas, R. L. (1960). "Transport of Phosphorus by Fungal Mycelium". Nature. 188 (4752): 763–764. Bibcode:1960Natur.188..763L. doi:10.1038/188763a0. PMID 13763967. S2CID 19987318.
- Lucas, R. L. (1955). "A Comparative Study of Ophiobolus graminis and Fusarium culmorum in Saprophytic Colonization of Wheat Straw". Annals of Applied Biology. 43: 134–143. doi:10.1111/j.1744-7348.1955.tb02459.x.
- Robinson, R. K.; Lucas, R. L. (1963). "The Use of Isotopically Labelled Mycelium to Investigate the Host Range and Rate of Spread of Ophiobolus graminis". The New Phytologist. 62 (1): 50–52. Bibcode:1963NewPh..62...50R. doi:10.1111/j.1469-8137.1963.tb06311.x. JSTOR 2429700.
- Robinson, R. K.; Lucas, R. L. (1967). "Observations on the Infection of Zea mays by Ophiobolus graminis". Plant Pathology. 16 (2): 75–77. Bibcode:1967PPath..16...75R. doi:10.1111/j.1365-3059.1967.tb00372.x.
- Wilkinson, Valerie; Lucas, R. L. (1969). "Effects of Herbicides on the Growth of Soil Fungi". New Phytologist. 68 (3): 709–719. Bibcode:1969NewPh..68..709W. doi:10.1111/j.1469-8137.1969.tb06475.x.
- Lyon, A. J. E.; Lucas, R. L. (1969). "The Effect of Temperature on the Translocation of Phosphorus by Rhizomes stolonifer". New Phytologist. 68 (4): 963–969. Bibcode:1969NewPh..68..963L. doi:10.1111/j.1469-8137.1969.tb06496.x.
- Wilkinson, Valerie; Lucas, R. L. (1969). "Effects of Constituents of Gramoxone W on Rates of Respiration of Soil Fungi". Weed Research. 9 (4): 288–295. Bibcode:1969WeedR...9..288W. doi:10.1111/j.1365-3180.1969.tb01487.x.
- Norris, John Robert; Ribbons, Douglas W., eds. (1971). Chapter XVIII. Autoradiographic Techniques in Mycology by R. L. Lucas. Methods in Microbiology. Vol. 4. Academic Press. pp. 501–508. doi:10.1016/S0580-9517(09)70023-6. ISBN 9780125215046.
