= Percy Wragg Brian =

British botanist (1910–1979)

Percy Wragg Brian FRS FRSE CBE
- Born: 5 September 1910; Hall Green, Yardley
- Died: 17 August 1979 (aged 68)
- Scientific career
- Fields: Botany

Percy Wragg Brian FRS FRSE CBE (5 September 1910 – 17 August 1979) was a British botanist and mycologist. He was critical to the development of plant pathology and natural antibiotics such as Gibberellin and Griseofulvin.

== Life ==
He was born in Hall Green, Yardley to Percy Brian (1881–1945), a schoolteacher from Macclesfield and his wife Adelaide Wragg. His early education was at King Edward's School, Birmingham. He graduated from King's College, Cambridge in 1931. He was awarded a PhD in 1936 and DSc in 1951, and he was elected a Fellow of Queens' College, Cambridge in 1968.

His first employment was as Assistant Mycologist at Long Ashton Research Station where he worked from 1934 to 1936. In 1936 he began at ICI's facility at Jealott's Hill before moving in the late 1930s to their Butterwick Research Laboratories (later renamed Akers) as Mycologist and in 1946 was promoted to Head of Microbiology. He served in this role for ICI until 1961 and spent his final two years with them as Associate Research Manager. During this period, in 1962, he was on a team which discovered new antibiotics produced by fungi.

He was appointed to the Regius Chair of Botany at University of Glasgow in 1962, leaving six years later to become Head of the Cambridge Botany School.

He was elected a Fellow of the Royal Society in 1958. In 1964 he was made a Fellow of the Royal Society of Edinburgh.

He was President of the British Mycological Society in 1959 and 1965; President of the Association of Applied Biologists in 1961; and President of the Society of General Microbiology from 1965 to 1968.

== Family ==
He married twice, firstly to Iris Hunt in 1934 (dissolved) secondly to Meg Gilling in 1948. His younger brother, Michael Vaughan Brian (1919–1990), was an entomologist, specialising in ants.
