= John Frederick Peberdy =

British mycologist (1937–2020)

John Frederick Peberdy FRSB MBE (8 November 1937, Skegness – 14 May 2020) was a British mycologist, specializing in the biochemistry and genetics of fungi. He was a pioneer in research on fungal protoplasts.

== Biography ==
Peberdy grew up in the Bucknall area of Nottingham. He studied botany at King's College, Newcastle (then part of Durham University), where he developed a strong interest in fungi and microbiology. He then became a graduate student at the University of Nottingham, where he received his Ph.D. supervised by Charles Chesters with a dissertation on fungal biochemistry.

Throughout his career, Peberdy was interested in practical and commercial applications of mycology and biotechnology. After receiving his Ph.D., he worked briefly in Stevenage as a Scientific Officer at a Water Pollution Research Laboratory before he was appointed to a lecturership at Hull College of Technology and then in 1966 to a lectureship in microbiology at the University of Nottingham. There he was appointed in 1977 to a senior lectureship, in 1980 to a readership, and in 1984 to a professorial chair in botany. At the University of Nottingham, he was from 1996 to 1998 the head of the School of Life Sciences from 1996 to 1998 and an Emeritus Professor of Biotechnology and Enterprise in the Business School from 2004 to 2015, when he retired completely from academia.

Peberdy was the author or co-author of more than 190 scientific papers. He supervised more than 60 PhD and Masters students and postdocs. He travelled extensively and collaborated with mycologists all over the world. He developed collaborations in Europe, Asia (especially Thailand), North America, and South America. He made sabbatical visits to Belgium and Hong Kong. Hungary's University of Szeged awarded him an honorary D. Sc.

Peberdy ran one of the first laboratories to achieve fungal transformation (which began in the 1980s). He did research on "genetics of fungal secondary metabolite production, antifungal agents, plant pathogens, edible mushrooms, and the biotechnology of exploitation by fungi of waste resources". He was one of the organizers of the "European Conference of Fungal Genetics" (ECFG) series of meetings and was the lead host of the inaugural ECFG, which was held from the 20th to the 23rd of August 1992 at the University of Nottingham. Since 1992 the conference has been held every two years. Peberdy was one of the co-organisers of the ninth ECFG (ECFG9), which was held in 2008 in Edinburgh.

In the Society of Biology (renamed in 2015 the "Royal Society of Biology"), Peberdy was elected a Fellow, served on its council during the 1980s, and chaired its East Midlands Branch. He also served on the council of the Society for General Microbiology (renamed in 2015 the "Microbiology Society"). In the 1990s he was one of the founders of a small biotechnology company, as well as a national UK biotechnology competition in which UK university students compete by proposing ideas for biotechnology start-ups. This competition called "Biotechnology Young Entrepreneurs Scheme (Biotechnology YES)" became very successful. For his services to student entrepreneurship, Peberdy was made in 2000 MBE.

He helped to initiate annual summer lab walks to help group bonding and to show the plants and fungi of the Derbyshire Peak District to overseas students. He was the president of the British Mycological Society for one year from 1984 to 1985. As president, he attended the society's spring and autumn forays and surprised the field mycologists with his extensive field knowledge of fungi and plants.

In 1964 in Basford, Nottinghamshire, John F. Peberdy married Jennifer "Jennie" A. Fry. Upon his death in 2020 he was survived by his widow and their daughter Caroline.

== Eponyms ==
- Trichoderma peberdyi

== Selected publications ==
=== Articles ===
- Peberdy, J. F. (1979). "Fungal Protoplasts: Isolation, Reversion, and Fusion". Annual Review of Microbiology. 33: 21–39. doi:10.1146/annurev.mi.33.100179.000321. PMID 386922.
- Hamlyn, Paul F.; Bradshaw, Rosemary E.; Mellon, Fiona M.; Santiago, Claro M.; Wilson, Jane M.; Peberdy, John F. (1981). "Efficient protoplast isolation from fungi using commercial enzymes". Enzyme and Microbial Technology. 3 (4): 321–325. doi:10.1016/0141-0229(81)90007-7.
- Peberdy, J. F. (1990). "Fungal Cell Walls — A Review". Biochemistry of Cell Walls and Membranes in Fungi. pp. 5–30. doi:10.1007/978-3-642-74215-6_2. ISBN 978-3-642-74217-0.
- Ulhoa, C. J.; Peberdy, J. F. (1991). "Regulation of chitinase synthesis in Trichoderma harzianum". Journal of General Microbiology. 137 (9): 2163–2169. doi:10.1099/00221287-137-9-2163. PMID 1748872.
- Ulhoa, Cirano J.; Peberdy, John F. (1992). "Purification and some properties of the extracellular chitinase produced by Trichoderma harzianum". Enzyme and Microbial Technology. 14 (3): 236–240. doi:10.1016/0141-0229(92)90072-V.
- Peberdy, John F. (1994). "Protein secretion in filamentous fungi — trying to understand a highly productive black box". Trends in Biotechnology. 12 (2): 50–57. doi:10.1016/0167-7799(94)90100-7. PMID 7764536.
- Segers, Rudi; Butt, Tariq M.; Kerry, Brian R.; Beckett, Alan; Peberdy, John F. (1996). "The role of the proteinase VCP1 produced by the hematophagous Verticillium chlamydosporium in the infection process of nematode eggs". Mycological Research. 100 (4): 421–428. doi:10.1016/S0953-7562(96)80138-9.
- Archer, David B.; Peberdy, John F. (1997). "The Molecular Biology of Secreted Enzyme Production by Fungi". Critical Reviews in Biotechnology. 17 (4): 273–306. doi:10.3109/07388559709146616. PMID 9397531.
- Taechowisan, Thongchai; Peberdy, John F.; Lumyong, Saisamorn (2003). "Isolation of endophytic actinomycetes from selected plants and their antifungal activity". World Journal of Microbiology and Biotechnology. 19 (4): 381–385. doi:10.1023/A:1023901107182. S2CID 81583157.

=== Books ===
- Peberdy, J.F. (2013). Developmental Microbiology. Tertiary Level Biology. Springer U.S. ISBN 978-1-4613-3927-4. (pbk reprint of 1980 1st edition)
- Peberdy, J.; Ferenczy, Lajos, eds. (1985). Fungal Protoplasts: Applications in Biochemistry and Genetics. Mycology. Taylor & Francis. ISBN 978-0-8247-7112-6.
- Powell, K.A.; Renwick, A.; Peberdy, J.F., eds. (2013). The Genus Aspergillus: From Taxonomy and Genetics to Industrial Application. F.E.M.S. Symposium Series, No. 69 (Proceedings of a symposium held under the auspices of the Federation of European Microbiological Societies, April 5–8, 1993, in Canterbury, Kent, U.K.). Springer US. ISBN 978-1-4899-0981-7. (pbk reprint of 1994 1st edition)
