= Arthur Anselm Pearson =

English mycologist (1874–1954)

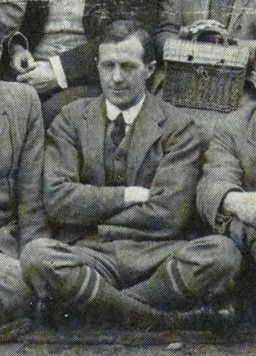
- Arthur Anselm Pearson, 1913
- Born: 12 April 1874; London
- Died: 12 March 1954 (aged 79)
- Known for: Contributions to taxonomic mycology
- Scientific career
- Fields: Mycology
- Author abbrev. (botany): A.Pearson

Arthur Anselm Pearson (12 April 1874 – 13 March 1954) was an English mycologist. He often published under the name A. A. Pearson. The standard author abbreviation A.Pearson is used to indicate this person as the author when citing a botanical name.

== Background and career ==
Pearson was born in London, but educated in Belgium. After leaving school he worked as a seaman before joining the firm of British Belting & Asbestos Ltd in Yorkshire, where he spent the rest of his working career, eventually becoming chairman of the firm. He had an interest in music, especially madrigals, folk song, and folk dancing, joining the English Folk Dance Society in 1924 and helping with the publication of the Folksong Index.

== Researches in mycology ==
Around 1910 Pearson began to research the larger fungi, encouraged by John Ramsbottom, mycologist at the Natural History Museum. His initial papers, co-authored by E. M. Wakefield, were on British corticioid fungi and heterobasidiomycetes, but he subsequently developed an expertise in the taxonomy of agarics, publishing a series of papers on this group of fungi from 1919 to 1952. In 1948 he produced a checklist of British species, co-authored with Dr R. W. G. Dennis of the Royal Botanic Gardens, Kew. Pearson spoke several European languages, collected fungi in Spain and Portugal (on which he wrote brief papers), was an active member of the Société mycologique de France, and was credited with introducing new, continental ideas on modern agaric taxonomy into Britain. In 1948 he was invited to survey fungi in South Africa, publishing a number of new species as a result. His last works were a series of keys to British agaric genera, several of which were published posthumously by his friend and fellow mycologist P. D. Orton.

Pearson was elected president of the British Mycological Society in 1931 and again in 1952. He also served as treasurer at the society. He was also president of the Yorkshire Naturalists' Union in 1946 and a fellow of the Linnean Society. He described several new species of fungi and at least eight species of fungi are named after him, including Cortinarius pearsonii, Paullicorticium pearsonii, and Squamanita pearsonii.

His papers are held at Kew Gardens and the Linnean Society of London.

== Selected publications ==
- Pearson, A. A. (1921). New British hymenomycetes. Transactions of the British Mycological Society 7: 55–58.
- Pearson, A. A. (1948). The genus Russula. Naturalist (London) 1948: 85–108.
- Pearson, A. A. (1950). Cape agarics and boleti. Transactions of the British Mycological Society 33: 276–316.
- Pearson, A. A. (1954). The genus Inocybe. Naturalist (London) 1954: 117–140.
- Pearson, A. A. & Dennis, R. W. G. (1948). Revised list of British agarics and boleti. Transactions of the British Mycological Society 31: 145–190.

== See also ==
- List of mycologists
