= Lorna I. Scott =

British botanist

Lorna Iris Scott (1895–1984) was a senior lecturer in Botany at University of Leeds. In 1949 she became the first woman president of the Yorkshire Naturalists’ Union and was president of the British Bryological Society in 1952–1953.

== Early life and education ==
Lorna Iris Scott was born on 29 September 1895 in Poona, India. Her parents were Major Horace William Scott (Lancashire Fusiliers) and Sophia Parsons Scott (née Fenemore). The family returned to Britain to live in Holland Park, but Scott was sent to Royal School for Daughters of Officers of the Army in Bath, Somerset. She became head girl. In 1914 she went to the women-only Royal Holloway College in London where she won the Driver Prize for Botany in 1917 and graduated with Class III honours in 1917. She was also successful in college sports, becoming the ‘River Captain’ for rowing. In 1928 she was awarded a MSc in Botany from Royal Holloway College.

== Career ==
In 1917 she was appointed as an assistant lecturer in the Agricultural Botany department at University of Leeds, later being promoted to a senior lectureship in the Botany department. From 1919 until 1937 she was also sub-warden of Lyddon Hall, a woman’s hall of residence.

Her research focused on plant anatomy, algology and bryology. She was co-author with Joseph Hubert Priestley, head of the department of botany, of “An Introduction to Botany”, first published 1938 which ran to four editions. The book featured her illustrations.

She was also a member of several professional associations including The Leeds Naturalists’ Club and The British Bryological Society (previously called the Moss Exchange Club). After Priestley died in 1944, she managed the botany department at Leeds for eighteen months until Irene Manton was appointed on 15 January 1946.

She retired in 1958 and moved to Yeovil, Somerset but continued to write and be involved in science. She died 13 December 1984.

== Publications ==
Scott was the co-author, with J. H. Priestley and Edith Harrison, of An introduction to botany with special reference to the structure of the flowering plant. Longmans, Green & Co. 1938 615 pp. Scott and Marjorie E. Malins produced the illustrations. This was successful and four editions were published (1938, 1949, 1955 and 1964).

Scott was the author or co-author of scientific publications including:

- J. H. Priestley and Lorna I. Scott (1935) The formation of a new cell wall at cell division. Proceedings of the Leeds Philosophical and Literary Society. 3 532-45
- J. H. Priestley and Lorna I. Scott (1933) Phyllotaxis in the dicotylodon from the standpoint of developmental anatomy. Biological Reviews, 8 125-140.
- Lorna I. Scott and J. H. Priestley (1928) The Root as an absorbing organ. I. A reconsideration of the entry of water and salts in the absorbing region. New Phytologist 27 125-140.
- Lorna I. Scott and J. H. Priestley (1925) Leaf and stem anatomy of Tradescantia fluminensis, Vell. Journal of the Linnean Society of London, Botany, 47 1 - 28.

== Honours and awards ==
Scott was elected a Fellow of the Linnean Society of London in 1945. She was president of the Yorkshire Naturalists’ Union in 1949. She was president of the British Bryological Society 1952–1953.
