= W. N. Cheesman =

William Norwood Cheesman
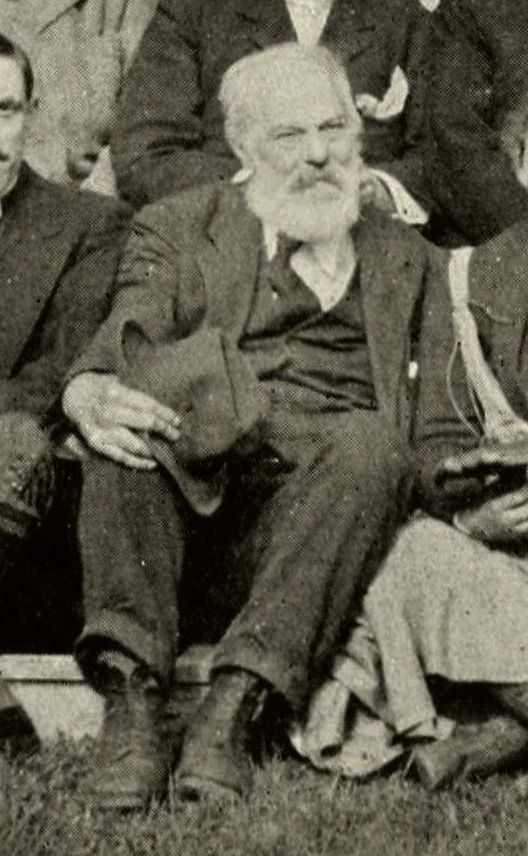
- Born: 1 February 1847; Winterton, Lincolnshire, England
- Died: 7 November 1925 (aged 78)
- Known for: Contributions to taxonomic mycology, botany
- Scientific career
- Fields: Mycology

William Norwood Cheesman (1 February 1847 – 7 November 1925) was an English businessman and mycologist from Selby who contributed to studies on fungi and slime moulds as an amateur and founding member of the Yorkshire Naturalists' Union and the British Mycological Society. He contributed principally as a collector with most species described by others including George Edward Massee. The fungal species Coprinus cheesmanii, Cyphella cheesmanii, and Verticicladium cheesmanii were named after him.

Cheesman was born in Winterton, Lincolnshire, and grew up at Hull. He joined the drapery business along with an uncle at Selby in 1870 but in 1878 he became interested in fungi. He began to collect specimens across the regions where he travelled including to South Africa as part of the British Association which he joined in 1900. He was elected to the Linnean Society in 1903.

Cheeseman was a prominent Freemason, writing papers on the subject, and was appointed a Justice of Peace in the last year of his life. He was the first President of the British Mycological Society to die in office. He is buried at Brayton Cemetery.
