= Arthur Edmund Muskett =

British phytopathologist (1900–1984)

Arthur Edmund Muskett OBE (15 April 1900, Norwich – 22 October 1984, Belfast) was a British phytopathologist and mycologist. He is noteworthy as a broadcaster who contributed to the Ulster Garden radio programme and as the president of the British Mycological Society for a one-year term from 1948 to 1949.

== Education and career ==
Muskett grew up on his father’s farm close to the village of Ashwellthorpe, about 20 km S.W. of Norwich. After education at the City of Norwich School, he joined in 1918 the Royal Air Force and served for a year as a pilot. In 1919 he matriculated at Imperial College London. There he studied chemistry for 2 years, before John Bretland Farmer persuaded him to switch to botany. Muskett graduated in 1922 with a B.Sc. in botany from Imperial College London.

In 1923 Muskett moved to Northern Ireland. In the department of agricultural botany of Queen's University Belfast (QUB) he was an assistant from 1923 to 1926, an assistant lecturer from 1926 to 1928, and a lecturer from 1928 to 1941. In QUB's department of mycology and plant pathology, he was a lecturer in charge of the department from 1941 to 1945. He was a professor of agricultural plant pathology at QUB from 1945 to 1966, when he retired as professor emeritus. Simultaneously with his appointments at QUB, Muskett held at the Ministry of Agriculture, in its Seed Testing and Plant Disease Division, a junior appointment from 1923 to 1931, an appointment as deputy head of the Plant Pathology Division from 1931 to 1938, and head of the Plant Pathology Division from 1938 until his retirement. He received in 1938 a D.Sc. from the University of London.

Muskett was the author or coauthor of about 70 scientific articles. In the 1930s and 1940s he did research on seed-borne diseases of oats, flax, and ryegrass. His research on plant pathology was practical and oriented toward the needs of agriculturalists in Ulster. He did research on the control of apple scab and (with H. Cairns and T. N. Greeves) on potato diseases. After WW II, Muskett was in charge of setting up QUB's Plant Pathology Field Station and shipping to Africa and southern Europe thousands of tons of potato seed tubers, which QUB's field station tested and found free from viral contamination.

In 1967 Muskett published an article Plant Pathology and the Plant Phytopathologist, giving a summary of the history and possible future trends of phytopathology, as well as its status in the 1960s. In the 1980s he published, with coauthor J. P. Malone of the Plant Pathology Division, Department of Agriculture for Northern Ireland, a series of 6 articles giving a catalogue of Irish fungi.

Muskets was an outstanding lecturer on botany, mycology, and horticulture. He was interested in environmental conservation and in 1957 founded Northern Ireland's Best Kept Towns awards.

In 1957 Muskett was appointed Officer of the British Empire. In 1985 Muskett’s former students and colleagues at QUB founded the Arthur Muskett Prize, which is awarded for outstanding academic achievement to a student enrolled in QUB's School of Biological Sciences. In October 2016 at a ceremony at QUB, Dame Mary Peters unveiled a plaque dedicated to Alfred Edmund Muskett.

A. E. Muskett and his wife had a son Bryan and a daughter Doreen. In 2008 Doreen Muskett was appointed Member of the British Empire (MBE).

== Selected publications ==
=== Articles ===
- Cairns, H.; Muskett, A. E. (1933). "Pink Rot of the Potato". Annals of Applied Biology. 20 (3): 381–403. doi:10.1111/j.1744-7348.1933.tb07437.x.
- Cairns, H.; Greeves, T. N.; Muskett, A. E. (1936). "The Control of Common Scab (Actinomyces Scabies (Thaxt.) Güss.) of the Potato by Tuber Disinfection". Annals of Applied Biology. 23 (4): 718–742. doi:10.1111/j.1744-7348.1936.tb06123.x.
- Muskett, A. E. (1937). "A Study of the Epidemiology and Control of Helminthosporium Disease of Oats". Annals of Botany. 1 (4): 763–783. doi:10.1093/oxfordjournals.aob.a083502. JSTOR 42906586.
- Muskett, A. E. (1938). "Biological Technique for the Evaluation of Fungicides: I. The Evaluation of Seed Disinfectants for the Control of Helminthosporium Disease of Oats". Annals of Botany. 2 (7): 699–715. doi:10.1093/oxfordjournals.aob.a084027. JSTOR 42906669.
- Muskett, A. E.; Horne, A. S.; Colhoun, J. (1938). "The Effect of Manuring Upon Apple Fruits". Annals of Applied Biology. 25: 50–67. doi:10.1111/j.1744-7348.1938.tb04347.x.
- Cairns, H.; Muskett, A. E. (1939). "Phytophthora Erythroseptica Pethybr. In Relation to ITS Environment". Annals of Applied Biology. 26 (3): 470–480. doi:10.1111/j.1744-7348.1939.tb06984.x.
- Greeves, T. N.; Muskett, A. E. (1939). "Skin Spot (Oospora Pustulans Owen & Wakef.) of the Potato, and ITS Control by Tuber Disinfection". Annals of Applied Biology. 26 (3): 481–496. doi:10.1111/j.1744-7348.1939.tb06985.x.
- Muskett, A. E.; Colhoun, J. (1940). "Prevention of Seedling Blight in the Flax Crop". Nature. 146 (3688): 32. Bibcode:1940Natur.146...32M. doi:10.1038/146032b0. S2CID 4122944.
- Colhoun, John; Muskett, Arthur E. (1943). "'Pasmo' Disease of Flax". Nature. 151 (3825): 223–224. Bibcode:1943Natur.151..223C. doi:10.1038/151223b0. S2CID 4100641.
- Calvert, E. L.; Muskett, A. E. (1944). "Blind Seed Disease of Rye-Grass". Nature. 153 (3879): 287–288. Bibcode:1944Natur.153..287C. doi:10.1038/153287a0. S2CID 8859099.
- Muskett, A. E. (1944). "The short wet method of seed disinfection". Annals of Applied Biology. 31 (3): 218–221. doi:10.1111/j.1744-7348.1944.tb06730.x.
- Calvert, E. L.; Muskett, A. E. (1945). "Blind-seed disease of rye-grass (Phialea temulenta Prill. & Delacr.)". Annals of Applied Biology. 32 (4): 329–343. doi:10.1111/j.1744-7348.1945.tb06264.x.
- Muskett, A.E. (1948). "Technique for the examination of seeds for the presence of seed-borne fungi". Transactions of the British Mycological Society. 30: 74–IN4. doi:10.1016/S0007-1536(48)80035-5.
- Muskett, A. E. (1950). "Copper-Deficiency Disease of Apple Trees". Nature. 165 (4205): 900–901. Bibcode:1950Natur.165..900M. doi:10.1038/165900b0. S2CID 4279961.

=== Books and monographs ===
- Muskett, Arthur E.; Colhoun, John (1947), The Diseases of the Flax Plant, Belfast: W & G Baird, ASIN B001SK9ZTI
- "Seed-borne Fungi. Description of 77 Fungus Species by J. P. Malone and A. E. Muskett". Proceedings of the International Seed Testing Association. Vol. 29. Wageningen: Association Internationale d'Essais de Semences. 1964. pp. 179–384.
- Muskett, A. E. (1976). "Mycology and Plant Pathology in Ireland". Proceedings of the Royal Irish Academy Section B Biological Geological and Chemical Science. Vol. 76. Royal Irish Academy. pp. 393–472. OL 19904805M.
