= Annie Lorrain Smith =

British lichenologist

Annie Lorrain Smith OBE
- Born: 23 October 1854; Everton, Liverpool, England
- Died: 7 September 1937 (aged 82); London, England
- Education: Royal College of Science
- Known for: Lichenology
- Scientific career
- Fields: Botany
- Workplaces: British Museum (Natural History)
- Author abbrev. (botany): A.L.Sm.

Annie Lorrain Smith (23 October 1854 – 7 September 1937) was a British lichenologist whose Lichens (1921) was an essential textbook for several decades. She was also a mycologist and founder member of the British Mycological Society, where she served as president for two terms.

== Early life and education ==
Though born in Liverpool, she lived with her family in rural Dumfriesshire where her father Walter was Free Church of Scotland minister in Half Morton parish a few miles north of Gretna Green. Her mother was Annie Lorrain née Brown. She had several talented siblings, including the pathologist, Professor James Lorrain Smith.

After school in Edinburgh she went abroad to study French and German, and then worked as a governess. She moved to London, started studying botany in about 1878 went to classes at the Royal College of Science taught by D. H. Scott.

== Career ==
Scott found work for Lorrain-Smith at the Natural History Museum to curate Anton de Bary's collection of slides of microscopical fungi, but she had to be paid from a special fund because women could not officially be employed there. She soon was responsible for identifying most of the fungi which arrived to the museum. She identified and reported on newly collected fungi, arriving from abroad as well as from the UK, and in total worked in the museum's cryptogamic herbarium from 1892 until 1933. She published various papers from 1895 to 1920.

Smith led a lichen survey of Clare Island, which was outside Clew Bay in Ireland, in 1910 and 1911. The Clare Island Survey involved not only Irish but also several European scientists who were all looking at different aspects of the island's natural history. The team were credited with the first project aimed at characterising a particular biogeographic area. In 1921 Smith wrote the illustrated Handbook of British Lichens which was a key to all known British lichens. In the same year Lichens was published and was quickly established as a classic text.

The standard author abbreviation A.L.Sm. is used to indicate this person as the author when citing a botanical name.

== Honours ==
In December 1904 she was elected one of the first women Fellows of the Linnaean Society (others included Ethel Sargant and Margaret Jane Benson) after a change in the society's bye-laws. She was later a member of their council (1918 -1921). She was a founding member of the British Mycological Society and was the president twice (1907, 1917). In 1931, when she was nearly seventy-seven, she was awarded a civil list pension "in recognition of her services to botanical science" and she retired the following year. In 1934 came an OBE: "Miss Annie Lorrain-Smith, F. L. S. for contributions to mycology and lichenology."

== Other information ==
She was committed to the cause of women's suffrage and women's rights and enjoyed foreign travel. She lived with her older sister for 50 years and was affected by her death in 1933. Lorrain Smith retired in 1934 and died in London in 1937.

== Eponymous taxa ==
The lichenised fungus Verrucaria lorrain-smithiae was named after her by Matilda Cullen Knowles.

== Selected publications ==
- Crombie, James M.; Smith, Annie Lorrain (1894). A Monograph of Lichens Found in Britain: Being a Descriptive Catalogue of the Species in the Herbarium of the British Museum, Part 1. London: British Museum (Natural History).
- Wrigley, M.; Smith, Annie Lorrain (1911). Studies of Trees and Flowers. Methuen.
- Smith, Annie Lorrain; Crombie, James M. (1911). A Monograph of Lichens Found in Britain: Being a Descriptive Catalogue of the Species in the Herbarium of the British Museum, Volume 2. London, Trustees of the British Museum.
- Smith, Annie Lorrain (1921). Lichens. University Press.
- Smith, Annie Lorrain (1921). Handbook of the British lichens. British Museum.

== See also ==
- Category:Taxa named by Annie Lorrain Smith
- Timeline of women in science
