= Harry Hugh Wormald =

English plant pathologist and mycologist

Harry Hugh Wormald (1879, West Yorkshire – 10 December 1955, Maidstone) was an English plant pathologist and mycologist, known for his research on fungal and bacterial diseases of fruit trees in the UK.

== Biography ==
Harry Wormald was christened on 16 November 1879 in Luddenden. After being trained as a school teacher, he taught in Yorkshire schools from 1900 to 1908. In 1908, with the aid of a scholarship from the London School Board, he matriculated at the Royal College of Science of Imperial College London. He graduated there in 1911 with a B.Sc. and was awarded an A.R.C.S. With another scholarship, he started research at Imperial College London and was awarded in 1912 a Diploma of Imperial College and in 1919 the D.Sc. From 1911 to 1923 he worked as an assistant to Ernest Stanley Salmon at Wye College. There Wormald did important research on the fungus Monilinia fructicola, which causes brown rot in cherries, plums, peaches, and apricots.

In 1923, Wormald was appointed the head of the plant pathology section of the East Malling Research Station (EMR). There, under the directorship of Ronald George Hatton, he worked until 1945. In 1936, Wormald was appointed EMR's assistant director and held that appointment until his retirement in 1945. In 1936, he made the important observation that, for the bacterial canker disease Pseudomonas syringae of cherry trees, branch cankers often develop from previously infected fruiting spurs. For ten years, beginning in 1935, he edited EMR's Annual Report. For the British Mycological Society, he served as the president for one year from 1940 to 1941 and was the joint editor of the Transactions of the British Mycological Society from 1931 to 1945. For the Association of Applied Biologists (AAB), he served on the AAB's Council from 1937 to 1939 and as the vice-president from 1938 to 1939. In 1945, Wormald became a staff member of the Commonwealth Bureau of Horticulture and Plantation Crops, stationed at East Malling. There he worked for seven years as an abstractor of horticultural literature for many different languages — he could expertly translate seven foreign languages into English. During the last three years of his life, he suffered from severe disease, but with the help of his wife, he was able to prepare new editions of his two principal works, The Brown Rot Diseases of Fruit Trees and The Diseases of Fruits and Hops.

== Selected publications ==
=== Articles ===
- Wormald, H. (May 1914). "A bacterial rot of celery". The Journal of Agricultural Science. 6 (2): 203–219. doi:10.1017/S002185960000280X. S2CID 85092916.
- "A "wither tip" of plum trees". Annals of Applied Biology. V: 28–59. July 1918.
- Wormald, H. (July 1919). "The 'Brown Rot' Diseases of Fruit Trees, with Special Reference to Two Biologic Forms of Monilia cinerea, Bon. I". Annals of Botany. 33 (131): 361–404. doi:10.1093/oxfordjournals.aob.a089728. JSTOR 43236860.
- "A Phytophthora rot of pears and apples". Annals of Applied Biology. VI: 89–100. December 1919.
- "The mulberry "blight" in Britain". Annals of Applied Biology. XI: 169–174. July 1924.
- Wormald, H. (1931). "Bacterial Diseases of Stone Fruit Trees in Britain. III the Symptoms of Bacterial Canker in Plum Trees". Journal of Pomology and Horticultural Science. 9 (4): 239–256. doi:10.1080/03683621.1931.11513380.
- Wormald, H. (1943). "Papery bark canker of fruit trees in relation to silver leaf disease". Journal of Pomology and Horticultural Science. 20 (4): 144–146. doi:10.1080/03683621.1943.11513607.

=== Books and monographs ===
- The brown rot diseases of fruit trees. Bulletin of the Ministry of Agriculture, lxxxviii. London. 1935.
  - The brown rot diseases of fruit trees. Technical Bulletin of the Ministry of Agriculture, Number 3. Ministry of Agriculture. 1954; revision of 1935 publication; abstract for 1954 publication
- Diseases of hops and fruits. London: Crosby Lockwood & Son. 1939. abstract
  - abstract for revised 3rd edition, 1955
