= Kathleen Sampson =

Botanist 1892–1980

Kathleen Sampson (23 November 1892 – 21 February 1980) was an English mycologist and plant pathologist, with a focus in herbage crops and cereal diseases. She was a leading authority on smut fungi growing in the British Isles.

== Early life ==
Sampson was born on 23 November 1892 in Chesterfield, Derbyshire. She received her Bachelor of Science from Royal Holloway College, University of London in 1914. During her study Sampson was awarded the London University Gilchrist Scholarship for Women in 1913, and the Driver Scholarship for Botany in 1914 as well as being awarded the Driver essay prize in 1914. She graduated with her Masters in Science in 1917 which was focused on Phylloglossum and overseen by fossil fern specialist Professor Margaret Benson. The results from her thesis were published in the Annals of Botany in the same year.

== Career ==
Sampson worked at the University of Leeds as an agricultural botany lecturer between 1915 and 1917. During this time she worked with Professor George Stapledon to test seeds for farmers as part of a wartime project. After the war Sampson worked at the University of Wales as an agricultural botany senior lecturer between 1919 and 1945, during which she helped set up the Welsh Plant Breeding Station. She was a member of the British Mycological Society for sixty years, serving as President in 1938. Her presidential address to the society is entitled Life cycles of smut fungi. Upon her retirement, Sampson moved to Aylesbury, Buckinghampshire where she set up a garden and bird sanctuary. When she died in 1980 she donated most of her estate to the Royal Society for the Protection of Birds.

== Selected publications ==
=== Articles ===
- Sampson, Kathleen (1928). "Disease of Grasses caused by Epichloe typhina". Nature. 121 (3038): 92–93. Bibcode:1928Natur.121...92S. doi:10.1038/121092b0. S2CID 30699698.
- —— (1928). "Comparative studies of Kabatiella caulivora (Kirchn.) Karak. and Colletotrichum trifolii Bain and Essary, two fungi which cause red clover anthracnose". Transactions of the British Mycological Society. 13 (1–2): 103–142. doi:10.1016/S0007-1536(28)80009-X.
- —— (1932). "Observations on a new species of Olpidium occurring in the root hairs of Agrostis". Transactions of the British Mycological Society. 17 (3): 182–194. doi:10.1016/S0007-1536(32)80014-8.
- —— (1933). "The systemic infection of grasses by Epichloe typhina (Pers.) Tul". Transactions of the British Mycological Society. 18: 30–47. doi:10.1016/S0007-1536(33)80025-8.
- —— (1935). "The presence and absence of an endophytic fungus in Folium temulentum and L. perenne". Transactions of the British Mycological Society. 19 (4): 337–343. doi:10.1016/S0007-1536(35)80031-4.
- —— (1937). "Further observations on the systemic infection of Lolium". Transactions of the British Mycological Society. 21 (1–2): 84–97. doi:10.1016/S0007-1536(37)80007-8.
- ——; Western, J.H. (1938). "Note on the supposed connexion between Mastigosporium album Riess and Dilophospora alopecuri (Fr.) Fr". Transactions of the British Mycological Society. 22 (1–2): 168–173. doi:10.1016/S0007-1536(38)80014-0.
- —— (1939). "Additional notes on the systemic infection of Lolium". Transactions of the British Mycological Society. 23 (4): 316–319. doi:10.1016/S0007-1536(39)80006-7.
- —— (1939). "Olpidium brassicae (Wor.) Dang. and its connection with Asterocystis radicis de Wildeman". Transactions of the British Mycological Society. 23 (2): 199–205. doi:10.1016/S0007-1536(39)80025-0.
- ——; Western, J.H. (1940). "Two diseases of grasses caused by species of Helminthosporium not previously recorded in Britain". Transactions of the British Mycological Society. 24 (2): 255–263. doi:10.1016/S0007-1536(40)80010-7.
- —— (1940). "List of British Ustilaginales". Transactions of the British Mycological Society. 24 (3–4): 294–308. doi:10.1016/S0007-1536(40)80029-6.

=== Books ===
- Diseases of British Grasses and Herbage Legumes (1941)
- Ainsworth, Geoffrey Clough; Sampson, Kathleen (1950). The British Smut Fungi (Ustilaginales). Commonwealth Mycological Institute.
