= Alan Rayner =

British biologist and educator (born 1950)

Alan Rayner (born 1950) is a British biologist and educator.

== Biography ==
Rayner was born in Nairobi, Kenya, as the youngest of two children. His mother was the Deputy Mayor of Nairobi and his father was a Plant Pathologist, working on coffee rust and coffee berry diseases. During his years in Kenya, Rayner received little schooling, but with the help of his sister learned the rudiments of reading, writing and arithmetic. The family moved to London in 1958. Rayner obtained B.A. and Ph.D. degrees in Natural Sciences at King's College, Cambridge, and was a reader in biology at the University of Bath from 1985 to 2011. Rayner has published over 160 academic papers, articles and book chapters seven academic texts in the field of biology, and was president of the British Mycological Society in 1998. He has been a BP Venture Research Fellow and a Visiting Miller Professor at the University of California, Berkeley. He became a Fellow of the Royal Society of Arts in 2010.

In 2001, Rayner hosted "The Language of Water", an event combining scientific and artistic material that led to the BBC Radio 4 series Water Story. In 2006 and 2007, he hosted "Unhooked Thinking" part I and II, which examined various aspects of addiction.

Since 2001, Rayner has been actively involved in developing his concept of "natural inclusionality", a philosophical approach to sustainability. He has two daughters with his wife Marion.
