= John Arthur Joseph Pateman =

British microbial geneticist

John Pateman FRS (18 May 1926—18 May 2011) was a british microbial geneticist whose contributions included the discovery of intracistronic or interallelic complementation with John Fincham, as well as developing our understanding of gene expression control in eukaryotic microorganisms.

He carried out his work on intracistronic complementation at the University of Sheffield in the laboratory of John Thoday. He was a lecturer in botany in Melbourne between 1958 and 1960. In 1960 he became a lecturer in Genetics at the University of Cambridge, before moving to Flinders University in 1966. He was appointed to the chair of Genetics at the University of Glasgow in 1970, before moving to the Australian National University in Melbourne (1979–1988). He became the Executive Director of the Centre for Recombinant DNA Research.

He was elected Fellow of the Royal Society in 1978.
