= Plant Pathology (journal) =

- Discipline: Phytopathology
- Language: English
- Edited by: Matt Dickinson

Publication details
- History: 1952-present
- Publisher: Wiley-Blackwell on behalf of the British Society for Plant Pathology
- Frequency: 9 issues a year
- Impact factor: 2.303 (2018)

Standard abbreviations
- ISO 4: Plant Pathol.

Indexing
- ISSN: 0032-0862

Links
- Journal homepage

Plant Pathology is a peer-reviewed scientific journal published by Wiley-Blackwell in association with the British Society for Plant Pathology. It was established in 1952 and was originally published by the Ministry of Agriculture. The journal publishes research articles and critical reviews on all aspects of plant pathology except for articles on pesticide and resistance screening. The editor-in-chief is Matt Dickinson.
