= Carleton Rea =

English mycologist, botanist, and naturalist (1861–1946)

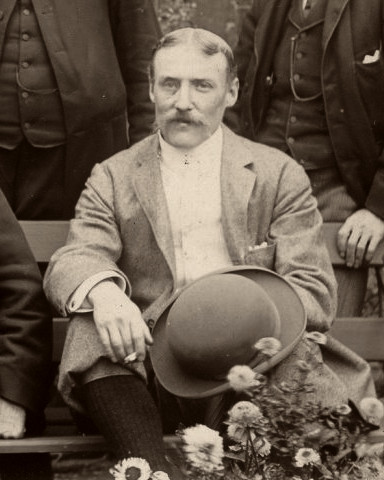
- Carleton Rea, 1895
- Born: 7 May 1861; Worcester, Worcestershire
- Died: 26 June 1946 (aged 85)
- Known for: Contributions to taxonomic mycology
- Scientific career
- Fields: Mycology
- Author abbrev. (botany): Rea

Carleton Rea (7 May 1861 – 26 June 1946) was an English mycologist, botanist, and naturalist.

== Background and education ==
Carleton Rea was born in Worcester, the son of the City Coroner. He was educated at The King's School and Magdalen College, Oxford, where he studied law. He entered the Inner Temple and became a barrister in the Oxford Circuit, but never pursued his career with undue enthusiasm and ceased taking cases by 1907.

== Natural history and mycology ==
In the words of John Ramsbottom, Rea was "active in his leisure" and devoted much of his time to natural history, having joined his local Worcestershire Naturalists' Club as a schoolboy (he was president of the club in its centenary year, at the time of his death). He collaborated with John Amphlett in the Botany of Worcestershire, published in 1909, and wrote several later supplements. His first paper in 1892 was on rare plants of the Severn Valley.

Rea's special interest was in fungi and in 1896 he was one of the founder members of the British Mycological Society. He was the first editor of the society's transactions and was elected its president in 1907 and again in 1921. Rea was a keen field mycologist, cutting a distinctive figure at forays in Panama hat, white waistcoat, knickerbockers, and monocle. He attended meetings in France and was made an honorary member of the Société mycologique de France in 1934. He also visited colleagues in the United States, including William Murrill, in 1926.

Rea's first wife, Emma Amy Rose, was also a naturalist and mycologist, painting many watercolours (now in the mycology collections at the Royal Botanic Gardens, Kew) of the fungi they collected together. She was elected president of the British Mycological Society in 1915.

Carleton Rea wrote a series of papers on British fungi, particularly agarics, and described a number of new species. His experience and knowledge of the larger basidiomycetes were eventually collected in the British Basidiomycetaceae (1922), the last comprehensive book on this group of fungi published in the British Isles and a standard reference work for some 30–40 years. The agaric species Agaricus reae, Cortinarius reae, Entoloma reae and Hygrocybe reae were named after him.

== Selected publications ==
- Amphlett, J. and Rea, C. (1909). Botany of Worcestershire. Birmingham, UK: Cornish Brothers Ltd.
- Rea, C. (1909). New and rare British fungi. Transactions of the British Mycological Society 3: 124-130
- Rea, C. (1922). British Basidiomycetaceae. A handbook of the larger British fungi. 799 pp. Cambridge: Cambridge University Press.
- Rea, C. (1922). "Presidential Address. A brief review". Transactions of the British Mycological Society. 8: 11–22. (brief review of the 1st 25 years of the British Mycological Society)
- Smith, A.L. & Rea, C. (1906). Fungi new to Britain. Transactions of the British Mycological Society 2: 127-131
