= Cecil Terence Ingold =

British mycologist (1905–2010)

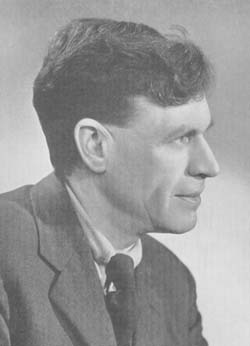
Cecil Terence Ingold

Cecil Terence Ingold CMG (5 July 1905 – 31 May 2010) was "one of the most influential mycologists of the twentieth century". He was president of the British Mycological Society where he organised the first international congress of mycologists. A group of aquatic fungi, most within the Helotiales, the Ingoldian fungi, were named after him. This group is of asexually reproducing fungi found in rivers and streams. Most of the names in this group are for an asexual stage in fungi where the sexual part of the cycle is not known, so recent DNA studies are changing many of the scientific names.

== Academic career ==
Terence Ingold was born at Blackrock, Dublin and attended school in Bangor, County Down. He studied at Queen's University in Belfast, Northern Ireland, and in 1926 won a First in his bachelor's degree in Biology and botany, with emphasis on mycology. He made a short study (in the style of A.H.R. Buller) of dispersal patterns of a Podospora species before taking up a scholarship in autumn 1926 at the Royal College of Science, London. Here the teaching and practicals in higher plant physiology by V. H. Blackman and others stimulated and laid a pattern for his later experimental thinking. He awoke to the value of scientific excursions (which became a keynote of his own teaching) through geological forays at Belfast led by J.K. Charlesworth, and taking part in Sir John Farmer's investigation of mountain vegetation in Snowdonia.

In 1927, the year in which he was elected to the Linnean Society of London, he returned to Queen's University for his doctorate in botany which he was awarded in 1930. His dissertation was on systems in plant sap that buffer against changes in pH. During this time he also mapped the vegetation of the summit of Slieve Donard: in 1934 the project was extended, with collaborators, to map the vegetation of the Mourne Mountains as a whole.

=== University of Reading ===
In 1929 Ingold was appointed to a faculty lectureship in the Department of Botany, then led by Professor J.R. Matthews, at the University of Reading. In 1934 the palaeobotanist Tom Harris succeeded to the chair, and greatly influenced him by the example of his energy, his immense knowledge of plants in their environment and in laboratory, and his clarity and honesty of intellect. In 1932, at the urging of the mycologist and agricultural advisor Walter Buddin, Ingold joined the British Mycological Society.

=== University of Leicester ===
Involvement with the Society strengthened Dr. Ingold's interests in the Fungi. They had become fully confirmed when, in 1937, he was appointed Lecturer in Charge of the Department of Botany at the University College of Leicester. Harris's constant encouragement and guidance were acknowledged in his book Spore Discharge in Land Plants, then in preparation. Ingold took the opportunity to clear away the preserved specimens and to teach from living plants. The analytic and instructive clarity of his line-drawings from the microscope were a hallmark of his research and teaching. The Leicestershire waters and waterways and their aquatic fungi became a focus of interest studied by a circle of his research students, especially in relation to chytridiaceous parasites of freshwater algae (in which his student Hilda Canter (Lund) became expert), and to aquatic Hyphomycetes. In 1942 he published his seminal work: "Aquatic hyphomycetes of decaying alder leaves".

=== Birkbeck College, University of London ===
The researches so commenced, and his own particular interest in the hyphomycetes, were continued by Ingold and his students over many years. In 1944 he was appointed to probably the foremost chair in United Kingdom in the field of mycology, at Birkbeck College, University of London. The Department of Botany had been led to prominence since 1909 by Dame Helen Gwynne-Vaughan, pioneer in fungal genetics, who was made Professor in 1921. Following her retirement as Professor Emerita, Ingold first had the task of maintaining its work in the bomb-damaged premises at Fetter Lane during the last months of the War. After the cessation of hostilities he was able to oversee its redevelopment and subsequent move in 1952 to the new Birkbeck College in Malet Street.

At Birkbeck Ingold continued to take a major role in the undergraduate teaching, and was joined in 1946 by his wartime Leicester student Bryan Plunkett as lecturer, who remained with him permanently thereafter. Lectures were customarily illustrated by multiple living cultures prepared in laboratory for use with microscopes. Emphasis on fieldwork, living organisms and plants in their environment was maintained by frequent forays with students to favoured locations. In 1965, with a departmental academic staff of seven, he observed that the increasing need to present Botany as an experimental subject would in future demand greatly enlarged facilities, which might only be achieved by the reorganisation of their work, with other biological colleagues, into a School of Life Sciences. Meanwhile, the Zoological and Botanical departments alternately led the annual expeditions or field trips with students and colleagues for the study of marine environments, for example to Dale Fort near Haverfordwest, Port Erin (Isle of Man), St Peter Port (Guernsey) and to the Scilly Isles.

An MSc course in mycology was developed, and much productive research was undertaken, both into aquatic ascomycetes and hyphomycetes, and in studies of the processes of spore production, release and dispersal. The book Dispersal in fungi (1953) described and emphasised dispersal as a vital problem in the life of fungi. Spore Liberation (1965), not a revision of the former, summarised fields of recent research to reveal how spore liberation was fundamental to understanding the structure of fungal fruiting bodies and bryophyte sporogonia. A full revision combining both works in the light of much further research appeared as Fungal Spores, Their Liberation and Dispersal in 1971. His textbook The Biology of Fungi, for those commencing formal study of fungi, was first published in 1961 and was fully revised in later editions. Ingold retired in 1972, and was succeeded by the palaeo-botanist W.G. Chaloner.

=== Service to scientific and educational bodies ===
In the University of London, Ingold was Dean of the Faculty of Science (1956–60), Chairman of the University Entrance and School's Examination Council (1958–64), Deputy Vice-Chancellor (1966–68), and Chairman of the Academic Council (1969–72). He served as Vice-Master of Birkbeck College from 1965 to 1970. He was a member of the Inter-Universities' Council for Higher Education Overseas, and its vice-chairman 1969–74. He made special efforts towards the development of the University of Botswana, Lesotho and Swaziland. He assisted in setting up the New University of Ulster (Coleraine) and the University of Kent (Canterbury).

Having served on the Council of the Linnean Society from 1955 to 1957, Ingold was its Botanical Secretary from 1962 to 1997, was Vice-President in 1954–55 and 1965–66, and was a gold medallist in 1983. He was twice President of the British Mycological Society (1953 and 1971), and was President of the First International Congress of Mycology at Exeter in 1971. He was also Chairman of the Council of the Freshwater Biological Association 1965–74. He continued to work on fungi for thirty years after his retirement. By 1985, at the age of 80, he had produced 174 scientific publications; and approximately 100 appeared after that date.

His daughter is Patsy Healey and his son is Tim Ingold.

== Contribution to mycology ==
Terence Ingold is best known for his pioneering studies into the mechanism of spore discharge; his textbook The Biology of Fungi (which ran to five editions between 1961 and 1984), and for his discovery of an entirely new group of fungi – the aquatic hyphomycetes – of which more than 600 species are now recognised.

== Honours and recognition ==
- In 1970 the Companion of the Order of St Michael and St George (CMG) was awarded to Ingold for his work in higher education, in both Africa and Jamaica, as well as the UK.
- In 1974 he delivered the Hooker Lecture, and he was awarded the Linnean Medal for Botany in 1983. In 1985 the Society published a Festschrift in his honour.
- He received honorary degrees from the Universities of Ibadan, Kent and Exeter.
- He was elected Corresponding Member of the Botanical Society of America.
- In 1996 he was awarded the De Bary Award by the International Mycological Association for "lifetime achievement in mycological research, particularly, contributions to our knowledge of fungal spore release and dispersal and the recognition of aquatic fungi as ecological specialists".
- In 1998 he received the Millennium Botanical Award and Botanical Congress Gold Medal from the International Botanical Congress.

== Major works ==
- 1939. Spore discharge in land plants. Oxford University Press. 178 pages; illustrated. ASIN B000872J9A
- 1971. Fungal spores: their liberation and dispersal. Oxford University Press. ISBN 9780198541158
  - This book is a new edition in combined form of Ingold's Dispersal in Fungi (1953) and Spore Liberation (1965).

== Eponymous taxa ==
- Ingoldia
- Ingoldiella
- Ingoldiomyces
- Acaromyces ingoldii
- Bensingtonia ingoldii
- Lindgomyces ingoldianus
- Lophiostoma ingoldianum
- Massarina ingoldiana
- Pseudocercophora ingoldii
- Tulipispora ingoldii

== See also ==
- Category:Taxa named by Cecil Terence Ingold

== Other sources ==
- Webster John (2005). "Centenary of a mycologist: C. Terence Ingold". Mycological Research. 109 (7): 753–754. doi:10.1017/s0953756205223559.
