= Frederick Bayard Hora =

British mycologist

Frederick Bayard Hora B.Sc., D.Phil. (1908-1984) was a British mycologist.

Born 1 September 1908 in Hove, he was educated at St Olave's School, London (1925). He attended evening classes at Birkbeck College, tutored by Prof Dame Helen Gwynne-Vaughan (Botany) and Prof H G Jackson (Zoology) and obtained his Higher School Certificate and Intermediate B.Sc. Winning by competition a Marshall's Exhibition he went to New College, Oxford, where he obtained a first class degree in botany (1932). He worked there as a demonstrator and later research assistant to Dr James (1935-1937), obtaining his DPhil in 1936 for plant physiology.

From 1937 to 1940 he was assistant in the herbarium, department of systematic botany, Imperial Forestry Institute, Oxford, under Dr J Burtt Davy, where he worked on the flora of Tropical East Africa.

From 1940 to 1973 he was lecturer and later reader (1964) in the botany department at University of Reading. He went on to publish many works on mycology and his book "Collins Guide to Mushrooms and Toadstools" in 1963 was one of the first popular books on fungi.

He joined the British Mycological Society in 1943 and was its president in 1958. He would often lead fungus forays.

After his retirement he contributed to "Flowering Plants of the World", edited by Prof V H Heywood, and was Consultant Editor for "The Oxford Encyclopedia of Trees of the World".

He married Carol Annis, 1940, in Oxford, and they had a daughter and three sons.

He died 10 April 1984, in Reading, after a stroke.

== Selected publications ==
Check-lists of the forest trees and shrubs of the British Empire. No. 5, Tanganyika Territory part 1. (1940). Hora, Frederick Bayard, Greenway, Percy James. Oxford: Imperial Forestry Institute

A field key to four hundred common mushrooms and toadstools. Hora, Frederick Bayard, Barber, K. I., Simmonds, A. M. (1950). Reading : Reading and District Natural History Society

The French foray, 13–21 September 1952. Hora, F.B. (1953). Transactions of the British Mycological Society 36 (2): 170–175.

The spring foray, Juniper Hall, 29 May to 1 June 1953. Hora, F.B. (1954). Transactions of the British Mycological Society 37 (2): 183–184.

The Dunkeld Foray, Scotland, 1–8 September 1953. Hora, F.B. (1954). Transactions of the British Mycological Society 37 (2): 185–190.

London, home counties, and provincial day forays, September and October, 1953. Hora, F.B. (1954). Transactions of the British Mycological Society 37 (2): 191.

The spring foray, Lake District, 27 May to 1 June 1954. Hora, F.B. (1955). Transactions of the British Mycological Society 38 (2): 177–181.

The New Forest foray, 7 to 14 September 1954. Hora, F.B. (1955). Transactions of the British Mycological Society 38 (2): 182–190.

Autumn day forays, 1954. Hora, F.B. (1955). Transactions of the British Mycological Society 38 (2): 1961.

Three new British agaric records. Hora, F.B.; Orton, P.D. (1955). Transactions of the British Mycological Society 38 (4): 400–404.

The spring foray, Pendley Manor, Tring, Herts, 11–15 May 1955. Hora, F.B. (1956). Transactions of the British Mycological Society 39 (2): 282–286.

The Bristol foray, 8–15 September 1955. Hora, F.B. (1956). Transactions of the British Mycological Society 39 (3): 391–397.

The Genus Panaeolus in Britain. Hora, F.B. (1957). The University of Leeds.

The Flatford Mill Foray. Hora, F.B. (1957). Transactions of the British Mycological Society 40 (1): 169–172.

New check list of British agarics and boleti. Part IV. Validations, new species and critical notes. Hora, F.B. (1960). Transactions of the British Mycological Society 43 (2): 440–459.

Collins Guide to Mushrooms and Toadstools. Lange, M.; Hora, F.B. (1963). UK, London; Collins.

The Oxford encyclopedia of trees of the world. Hora, Bayard (1981). Oxford University Press. ISBN 9780192177124
