= Charles Crossland =

English mycologist (1844–1916)

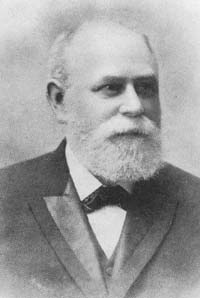
- Born: 3 September 1844; Halifax, Yorkshire
- Died: 9 December 1916 (aged 72); Halifax, Yorkshire
- Known for: Contributions to taxonomic mycology
- Scientific career
- Fields: Mycology
- Author abbrev. (botany): Crossl.

Charles Crossland (3 September 1844 – 9 December 1916) was an English mycologist.

== Background and career ==
Charles Crossland was born in Halifax, Yorkshire. His parents ran a general store and Charles left school at 13 to help them run the business. He trained as a butcher and opened a shop in Wyke in 1864, the same year he married Mary Ann Cragg. The couple had four children, two dying in infancy, and Mary Ann herself died in 1869. Charles remarried in 1871 and had two children by his second wife, Clementina Foster. In 1873, the couple returned to Halifax, where they opened a butcher's shop which they continued to run till Charles largely retired from the trade (leaving the shop mostly in the hands of a managing partner) in 1890. He was treasurer of the Halifax Butchers' Association from 1881 to 1908 and often referred to himself as a "Knight of the Cleaver".

He spoke and was interested in the local Halifax dialect, publishing a number of papers on local place-names and surnames in the Transactions of the Yorkshire Dialect Society, of which he was a member, eventually becoming the society's president. In later years, he also compiled a bibliography of Halifax, parts of which were published in the Transactions of the Halifax Antiquarian Society, as well as a local guide book, Pleasant walks around Halifax (1910).

He died in Halifax on 9 December 1916.

== Mycology ==
Crossland initially became interested in botany in 1880, whilst helping one of his daughters with a Sunday school wild flower project. He joined the Halifax Scientific Society to pursue his new-found enthusiasm, and subsequently the Yorkshire Naturalists' Union. In 1888, at a YNU fungus foray, Crossland met George Edward Massee who encouraged him to take an interest in fungi. As a result, he developed an expertise in mycology, with a particular interest in the discomycetes, making extensive local collections, often in the company of Henry Thomas Soppitt and fellow mycologist and bryologist James Needham. Crossland produced many papers on Yorkshire fungi, including several describing species new to science. His two major works were the cryptogamic section of the Flora of the parish of Halifax, jointly authored with botanist W.B. Crump in 1904, and The Fungus Flora of Yorkshire, a substantial volume co-authored with Massee, in 1905. His collections of fungi, drawings, and notes are now in the mycological herbarium at the Royal Botanic Gardens, Kew.

Charles Crossland became the first secretary of the Yorkshire Naturalists' Union Mycological Committee in 1892, becoming president of the union itself in 1907. He was a founder member of the British Mycological Society, becoming its first treasurer in 1896. He was made a fellow of the Linnean Society in 1899.

== Taxa ==
Crossland described several new species of fungi from Yorkshire, either individually or with Soppitt or Massee. These included several agarics, notably Lactarius glaucescens Crossl., but were mostly discomycetes, including Ascophanus globosopulvinatus (Crossl.) Boud. ex Ramsb., Niptera pilosa (Crossl.) Boud., Melastiza contorta (Massee & Crossl.) Spooner & Y.J. Yao, and Scutellinia citrina (Massee & Crossl.) Spooner & Y.J. Yao. A number of species were named in Crossland's honour, including Clavaria crosslandii Cotton, Ascobolus crosslandii Boud., and Octospora crosslandii (Dennis & Itzerott) Benkert.

== Selected publications ==
- Crossland, C. (1892). New and rare fungi near Halifax. The Naturalist 1892: 371–372
- Crossland, C. (1899). Mollisia cinerea and its varieties. Transactions of the British Mycological Society 1: 106–109.
- Crump, W.B. & Crossland, C. (1904). The flora of the parish of Halifax. Halifax Scientific Society https://archive.org/stream/floraofparishofh1904crum#page/n5/mode/2up
- Massee. G. & Crossland, C. (1905). The fungus flora of Yorkshire. London: A. Brown https://archive.org/stream/fungusfloraofyor00mass#page/n0/mode/2up
