= Harold Wager =

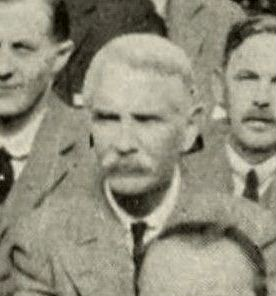
Harold Wager, 1918

Harold William Taylor Wager FRS (11 March 1862 – 17 November 1929) was a British botanist and mycologist. He was the uncle of the geologist Lawrence Rickard Wager. He was made a Fellow of the Royal Society in 1904. He was President of the British Mycological Society in 1910 and again in 1919.

Wager was first a lecturer in botany at the Yorkshire College, then at Victoria University, then later he took the role of an Inspector of Schools for the Board of Education.
