= James Needham (mycologist) =

English mycologist

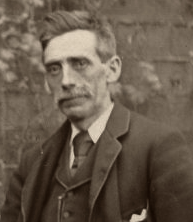
- Born: 19 March 1849; Hebden Bridge, Yorkshire, England
- Died: 14 July 1913 (aged 64); Hebden Bridge, Yorkshire, England
- Known for: Contributions to taxonomic mycology, botany, and ecology
- Scientific career
- Fields: Mycology

James Needham (19 March 1849 – 14 July 1913) was an English mycologist and iron moulder from Hebden Bridge, Yorkshire. He was a founding member of the British Mycological Society. Notable for his working-class status, Needham became one of the foremost collectors of fungi and bryophytes in the UK.

== Early and personal life ==
James Needham was born on 19 March 1849 in Hebden Bridge to Mary (née Greenwood) and Thomas Greenwood (1829–1885), an iron moulder. He was the oldest of ten children.

In 1861, Needham was working as a doffer in a cotton mill, while in 1871 he was working as an iron moulder.

Needham married Mary Ann Parker in 1871 and together they had six children. A year after his wife's death in 1889, he married Amelia Jones.

== Mycological career ==
Needham began studying botany after a trip to Hardcastle Crags with the Hebden Bridge Cooperative Society in 1885.

In 1889, he met Charles Crossland, who introduced him to fungi. Together with Crossland, he conducted some of the earliest ecological studies. He contributed many records to Crossland's and W. B. Crump's Flora of the Parish of Halifax (1904).

Needham discovered the liverwort Jubula hutchinsiae in Hebden Valley in 1896.

He was instrumental, along with Henry Thomas Soppitt, in the discovery of a heteroecious lifecycle in a Puccinia species. He was also amongst the first proponents of plant and fungal ecology in Great Britain.

His collections and archives are dispersed across the UK including Leeds Museum and Tolson Museum.

== Death ==
Needham died on 14 July 1913, at the age of 64 in Hebden Bridge. He was buried in Birchcliffe Baptist Church.
