= British Society for Plant Pathology =

- Website: http://www.bspp.org.uk

The British Society for Plant Pathology, or BSPP, is a UK-based organisation of British plant pathologists but accepts members from all countries. It was founded in 1981 and publishes three scientific journals: Plant Pathology, Molecular Plant Pathology and New Disease Reports. The BSPP has links to the International Society for Plant Pathology.

The organisation gives an annual award for the best student paper published in one of society's journals. The P. H. Gregory prize is awarded to the best presenter of an oral paper at the annual presidential meeting.

Like other organisations of its type it arranges conferences and also awards various scholarships and fellowships.

== History ==
The Federation of British Plant Pathologists was founded in 1966 and became the independent British Society for Plant Pathology in 1981.
