= Henry Thomas Soppitt =

English mycologist (1858–1899

- Born: 21 June 1858; Bradford, Yorkshire
- Died: 1 April 1899 (aged 40); Halifax, Yorkshire
- Known for: Contributions to taxonomic mycology, botany, and plant pathology
- Scientific career
- Fields: Mycology

Henry Thomas Soppitt (21 June 1858 in Bradford, Yorkshire – 1 April 1899 in Halifax, Yorkshire) was an English mycologist, plant pathologist, botanist and former greengrocer turned drysalter. He was a close collaborator with Charles Crossland, James Needham, and George Massee and was the first person to show a heteroecious lifecycle in a Puccinia species. Soppitt was a foundational member of the British Mycological Society.
