= Société mycologique de France =

French scientific society

Mycological Society of France
- Société mycologique de France
- Formation: 1884
- Founders: Lucien Quélet, Antoine Mougeot and René Joseph Justin Ferry
- Type: Learned society
- Headquarters: 20 rue Rottembourg, 12th arrondissement, Paris
- Location: France
- Official language: French
- President: Raphaël Hervé
- Website: www.mycofrance.fr

The Société mycologique de France (French pronunciation: [sɔsjete mikɔlɔʒik də fʁɑ̃s], Mycological Society of France), often known by the abbreviation SMF, is an association linking French and French-speaking mycologists.

== History ==
The society was founded in 1884 in Épinal in the Vosges by three doctors, Lucien Quélet (1832-1889), Antoine Mougeot (1815-1889) and René Joseph Justin Ferry (1845-1924), joined by two pharmacists, Émile Boudier (1828-1920) and Narcisse Théophile Patouillard (1854-1926).

The object of the society was to "Establish relationships between mycologists scattered in various parts of French territory, centralize their research and thereby achieve the foundation of a complete fungal flora of France".

It was the first mycological society in the world. One year after its creation it already had 128 members and three years later it had 250. Most founder members were pharmacists, doctors or teachers and then it opened to amateurs.

The society's headquarters are located at 20 rue Rottembourg in the 12th arrondissement of Paris.

== Activities ==
The society provides many activities and facilities for its members including

- Forest excursions hunting fungi accompanied by mycologists
- Identification sessions of collected fungi
- An annual exhibition of fresh mushrooms in Paris (in 2006 this was held from 11 to 15 October in the pavilion 18 of the Parc floral de Paris).
- An annual congress held in the French provinces (in 2006, this was held in Herbeumont (Belgium) from 25 to 30 September. In 2007, in Poitiers. In 2008 in Dourdan).
- Courses in mycology and microscopy for beginners.
- Access to its publications including the SMF database

== Publications ==
The society publishes a newsletter, an academic journal (the Bulletin de la Société Mycologique de France), a list of recommended French names of fungi and a database.

=== The SMF database ===
The SMF database ("Le fichier SMF") operates under Access and contains more than 16,000 species of fungi studied by mycologists for their botanical interest, notably those of particular interest to humans:

- 1384 edible fungi
- 469 inedible and toxic fungi
- 45 fatally poisonous fungi
