= Biomass partitioning =

Biological process of energy distribution

Biomass partitioning is the process by which plants divide their energy among their leaves, stems, roots, and reproductive parts. These four main components of the plant have important morphological roles: leaves take in CO_{2} and energy from the sun to create carbon compounds, stems grow above competitors to reach sunlight, roots absorb water and mineral nutrients from the soil while anchoring the plant, and reproductive parts facilitate the continuation of the species. Plants partition biomass in response to limits or excesses in resources like sunlight, carbon dioxide, mineral nutrients, and water and growth is regulated by a constant balance between the partitioning of biomass between plant parts. An equilibrium between root and shoot growth occurs because roots need carbon compounds from photosynthesis in the shoot and shoots need nitrogen absorbed from the soil by roots. Allocation of biomass is directed towards the limit to growth; a limit below ground will focus biomass to the roots and a limit above ground will favor more growth in the shoot.

Plants photosynthesize to create carbon compounds for growth and energy storage. Sugars created through photosynthesis are then transported by phloem using the pressure flow system and are used for growth or stored for later use. Biomass partitioning causes this sugar to be divided in a way that maximizes growth, provides the most fitness, and allows for successful reproduction. Plant hormones play a large part in biomass partitioning since they affect differentiation and growth of cells and tissues by changing the expression of genes and altering morphology. By responding to environmental stimuli and partitioning biomass accordingly, plants are better able to take in resources from their environment and maximize growth.

== Abiotic Factors of Partitioning ==
Liebig's Barrel with water running out of the lowest slat.

It is important for plants to be able to balance their absorption and utilization of available resources and they adjust their growth in order to acquire more of the scarce, growth-limiting resources: sunlight, carbon dioxide, mineral nutrients, and water. The equilibrium of biomass partitioning can be explained by Liebig's Law of the Minimum and modeled through the metaphor of Liebig's Barrel in which the limiting resource of plant growth is like the shortest slat on a barrel full of water. The barrel can only hold water up to the level of the shortest slat and, likewise, plants can only grow at a rate allowed by the limiting resource. To continue growing, biomass must be partitioned to help sequester these resources.

=== Sunlight ===
The main light-sensing mechanism for plants is the phytochrome system with pigments located throughout the plant to detect changes in red and far-red light. The phytochromes' detection of light quality is what helps trigger changes in biomass partitioning. Plants grown in low light conditions have been shown to allocate more biomass to shoots (mainly leaves). By measuring leaf area of plants at different levels of irradiance or sunlight, it has been determined that lower levels of light cause total plant leaf surface to increase. If sunlight is limiting the plant increases growth to the shoot and decreases the energy partitioned to the roots because the lower rates of photosynthesis lessen the need for water and mineral nutrients.

As low light causes greater allocation to the shoot, the same correlation is made for plants in high light; higher irradiance causes smaller total lower surface area because less surface area is needed to absorb sunlight. When a plant has more than enough photosynthetic capacity, it will instead prioritize growth in the roots to absorb water and nutrients.

=== Carbon Dioxide ===
In a situation where carbon is the limiting resource, increasing the levels of CO_{2} increases photosynthetic rates. This will also cause increases in nutrient uptake and water use, focusing more growth towards the roots. In low CO_{2} concentrations, plants create larger and more numerous leaves to bring in more CO_{2}. The impacts of atmospheric carbon dioxide concentration on biomass partitioning is important to understanding in impacts on plants in the face of climate change. Plant cells have increased carbon to nitrogen ratios when CO_{2} concentrations are higher, which decreases levels of decomposition. The decrease in decomposition caused by high carbon dioxide concentrations has the effect of decreasing nitrogen availability for plants.

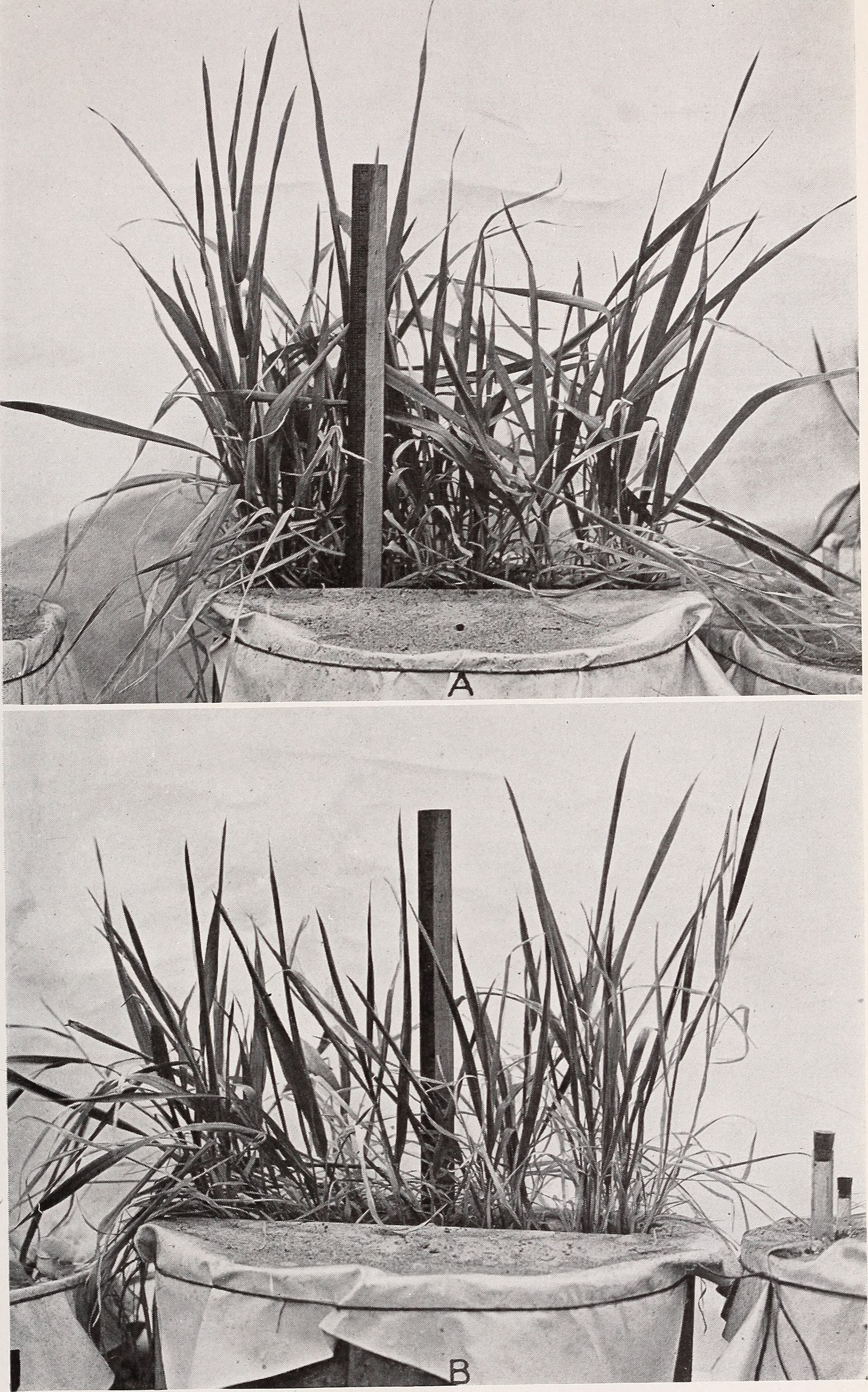
Fertilized barley (above) and unfertilized barley (below). Shoots of the unfertilized barley are slightly shorter and less full.

=== Mineral Nutrients ===
Overall, nutrient availability has a strong effect on partitioning, with plants growing in poor nutrient areas partitioning most of their biomass to underground structures. Soil nitrogen availability, for example, is a strong determinant of biomass allocation. For example, in low productivity systems (low levels of soil nitrogen) such as boreal forests, trees devote a large portion of their biomass to roots. But as soil productivity increases, biomass is primarily allocated to aboveground structures such as leaves and stems. As an overall pattern, the lengths of roots decrease as nutrient concentrations increase. High concentrations of a mineral nutrient that lead to toxicity can have a strong effect on growth and partitioning as well. For instance, in toxic concentrations of cadmium and lead, Fagus sylvatica was shown to develop a more compact and less branched root system while establishing few root hairs. This altered structure functions to reduce surface area of the roots and the effects of toxic nutrients while also conserving biomass for parts of the plant where growth would be more beneficial.

=== Water ===
Plants grown in dry conditions often have a decreased total biomass production but they also contribute more of their biomass to the roots and develop a higher root to shoot ratio. When plants allocate more of their biomass to their roots, they are able to enhance water absorption by tapping further down into the water table and extending root mass further laterally. Increased root hairs also aid in increasing absorption. When there is an extreme soil drought, there is not an increase in root to shoot biomass, because a state of dormancy is adopted. Water availability also impacts leaf surface area as too much surface area could allow for excessive transpiration in low water conditions.

== Biotic Factors of Partitioning ==
Interactions between organisms can also alter partitioning due to competition for resources, sharing of resources, or reduction of plant biomass.

=== Competition ===
Interspecific and intraspecific competition can cause a decrease in the available resources for an individual plant and alter how it partitions biomass. For instance, competition between plants causes decreased radial growth in branches and the stem while increasing growth of the roots and height of the stem. This provides reasoning for the importance of phenotypic plasticity in maintaining fitness in a competitive environment; the better a plant is at altering its morphology, the more competitive it will be.

The fungus gives the plant water and nutrients while the plant gives the fungus sugars from photosynthesis.

=== Mutualism With Mycorrhizae ===
The relationship between plants and mycorrhizal fungi is an example of mutualism because plants provide fungi with carbohydrates and mycorrhizal fungi help plants absorb more water and nutrients. Since mycorrhizal fungi increase plants' uptake of below-ground resources, plants who form a mutualistic relationship with fungi have stimulated shoot growth and a higher shoot to root ratio.

=== Herbivory ===
Herbivory causes a short-term reduction in leaf mass and/or stem mass that shifts stability and proportions of plant parts. To restore the balance between uptake of nutrients/water and photosynthetic rates, plants send more energy to the stems and leaves. Herbivory causing high levels of defoliation (greater than 25% of leaf area) increases growth to the shoot, seeking to achieve the same shoot to root ratio as before defoliation. Therefore, defoliation also reduces root growth and nutrient uptake until the before-defoliation root to shoot ratio is restored.

== Plant Type ==
As different plants have different structures and growth forms, their partitioning of biomass is not identical either. For example, evergreen trees have higher leaf mass fractions (LMFs) compared to deciduous trees. Additionally, the stem to root ratio varies between species more greatly in herbaceous plants than woody ones as the plasticity for roots in herbaceous plants is higher. Furthermore, herbaceous monocots or graminoids compared with herbaceous dicots have larger root to total mass ratios (RMFs). The difference in herbaceous monocots and dicots may be explained by differences in efficiency of nutrient uptake or by the need for graminoids to store more starch and nutrients to regrow after fire or grazing. Biomass partitioning can also be affected by a plant's method of carbon fixation: C3 or C4. For herbaceous monocots, the type of photosynthesis does not affect the percentile LMF or RMF, but in herbaceous dicots, C4 species have lower RMFs. The life cycle of plants can also cause different allocation strategies and ratios for leaves, roots, and stems; compared to same-size eudicotelydonous perennials, annuals put more energy into growing leaves and stems than perennial species.

== Age ==
Biomass partitioning patterns can also change as plants age. In pinus strobus stands of 2, 15, 30, and 65 years old, the root to shoot ratio was 0.32, 0.24, 0.16, and 0.22 respectively showing a decrease in root mass compared to shoot mass in the first few decades of growth. Age also affects how trees partition biomass to different components of the stem. Growth of branches and leaf surface area decreases with age as partitioning to the trunk increases.

== Methods/ Measurement ==
Many biomass partitioning studies consist of manipulative experiments that increase or reduce levels of growth-limiting resources and observe the effects. Often-times these studies use potted plants grown in a greenhouse to measure effects of density, excess nutrients, low light etc. Other studies may focus on observation and analysis of naturally occurring plants or use data analysis of previous measurements. The methods and measurements for determining biomass partitioning can be quite difficult due to the weight and volume of larger plants. Furthermore, measuring size and weight of roots entails washing and careful removal of soil to get accurate measurements. Plant biomass is often measured in terms of leaf mass fraction (LMF), stem mass fraction (SMF), and root mass fraction (RMF) where the dry mass of the plant part is set over the total dry mass of the plant. Lateral, radial, and height increases are used to quantify rates of growth.

== See also ==
- Biomass allocation
- Plant development
