= Canon EF 28mm lens =

35 mm camera lens

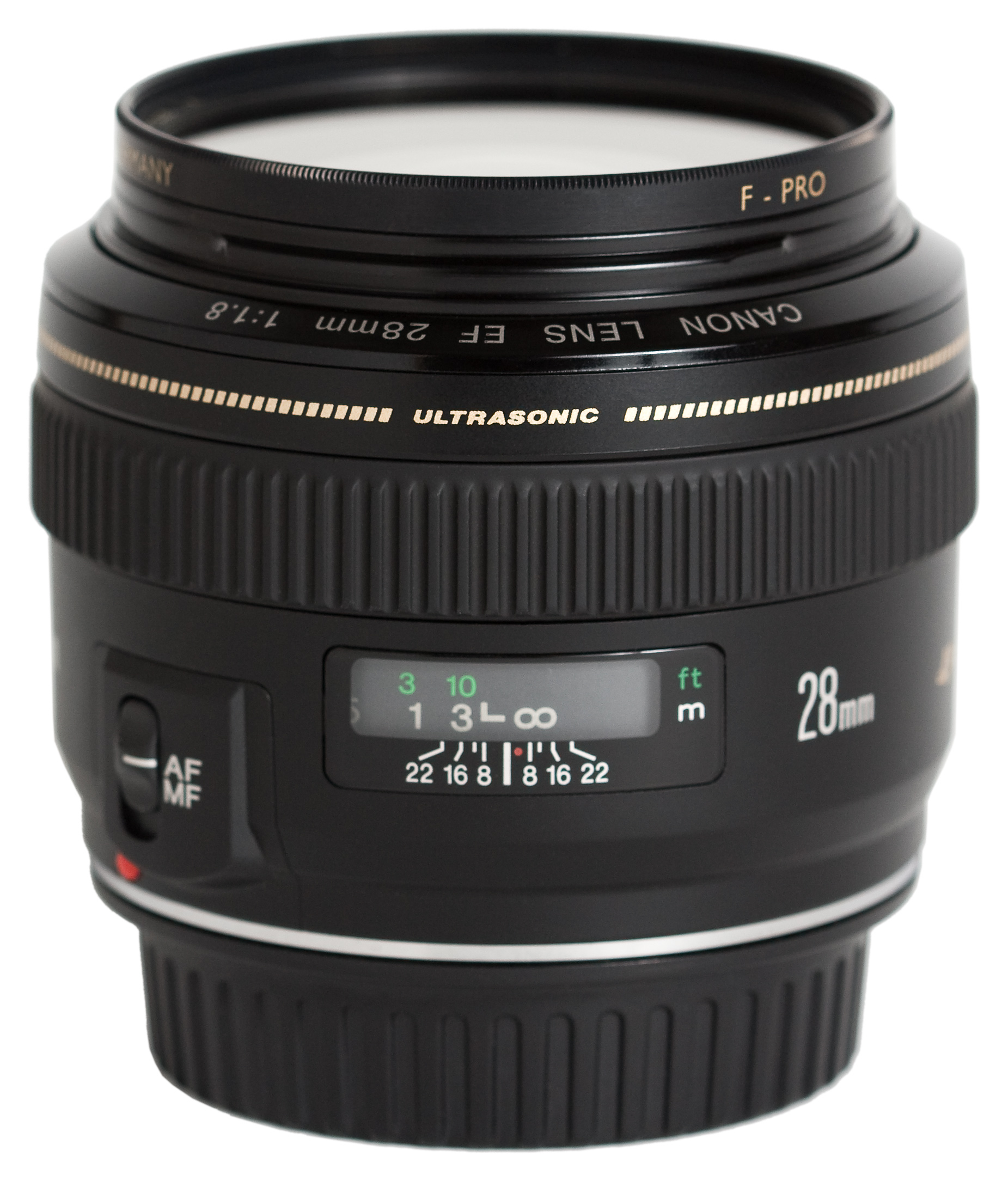
The Canon EF 28mm f/1.8 USM lens

The EF 28mm lenses are a group of prime lenses made by Canon that share the same focal length.

These lenses use the EF type mount that fits the Canon EOS line of cameras. When used on a camera body with an APS-C sensor, such as the Canon EOS 700D, it provides a narrower field of view, equivalent to a 45 mm lens mounted on a 35 mm frame body. With a 1.3x body such as the Canon EOS-1D Mark III, it provides a less narrow field of view, equivalent to a 36 mm lens mounted on a 35 mm frame body.

Three EF 28mm lenses have been sold by Canon:

- f/2.8, introduced April 1987 (now discontinued, replaced by f/2.8 IS USM)
- f/1.8 USM, introduced September 1995
- f/2.8 IS USM introduced June 2012

With the discontinuation of the EF 15mm Fisheye Lens in 2011, the EF 28mm f/2.8 lens became the oldest EOS lens in production before being itself discontinued after the release of the IS version. The IS version marked another milestone for Canon; that lens and the 24mm f/2.8 IS lens introduced at the same time were Canon's first image-stabilized prime lenses with a focal length less than 100 mm, as well as the company's first image-stabilized non-L primes.

== Specifications of the EF 28mm lenses ==
Attribute	f/1.8 USM	f/2.8	f/2.8 IS USM
Image			
Key features
Full-frame compatible	Yes Yes		
Image stabilizer	No No		Yes Yes
Ultrasonic Motor	Yes Yes	No No	Yes Yes
L-series	No No		
Diffractive Optics	No No		
Macro	No No		
Technical data
Aperture (max-min)	f/1.8-f/22	f/2.8-f/22	
Construction	9 groups / 10 elements	5 groups / 5 elements	7 groups / 9 elements
# of diaphragm blades	7	5	7 (circular)
Closest focusing distance	0.25 Meters	0.3 Meters	0.23 Meters
Max. magnification	0.18x	0.13x	0.2x
Horizontal viewing angle	65°		
Diagonal viewing angle	75°		
Vertical viewing angle	46°		
Physical data
Weight	.68 lb / 310g	.41 lb / 186g	.57 lb / 260g
Maximum diameter	2.9" / 74 mm	2.6" / 67 mm	2.69" / 68.4 mm
Length	2.2" / 56 mm	1.7" / 43 mm	2.02" / 51.5 mm
Filter diameter	58 mm	52 mm	58 mm
Accessories
Lens hood	EW-63II	EW-65II	EW-65B
Case	LP814	LP811	LP1014
Retail information
Release date	September 1995	April 1987	June 2012
Currently in production?	Yes Yes	No No	Yes Yes
MSRP $	$509.99	$374.99	$549.99
