= Lilian Hawker =

British mycologist

Lilian Edith Hawker c. 1955

Lilian Edith Hawker (19 May 1908 – 5 February 1991) was a British mycologist, known for her work on fungal physiology, particularly spore production. She was an expert on British truffles, and also published in the fields of plant physiology and plant pathology. She was also known for her contributions to education in mycology. Most of her career was spent at the botany department of the Imperial College of Science and Technology (1932–45) and the University of Bristol (1945–73), where she held the chair in mycology (1965–73) and was dean of the science faculty (1970–73). She served as president of the British Mycological Society, and was elected an honorary member of that society and of the Mycological Society of America. She published an introduction to fungi and two books on fungal physiology, of which Physiology of Fungi (1950) was among the first to survey the field, and also co-edited two microbiology textbooks.

== Early life and education ==
Hawker was born in Reading, Berkshire in 1908. Her father was a schoolteacher. She was educated at Reading School and went up to the University of Reading in 1925, obtaining a BSc in botany (1929) followed by a MSc in plant geotropism (1931). She was taught by Walter Stiles. Her first research paper appeared in 1930, based on work she completed as an undergraduate on reproduction in the yew tree.

== Career ==
Hawker briefly researched plant physiology at the University of Manchester (1931–32). In 1932, after taking a course by the mycologist William Brown, she shifted her focus to fungal physiology. Around this time, Walter Buddin at Reading also interested her (and Terence Ingold) in collecting fungi in the wild, a lifelong pursuit. Hawker joined Brown's group at the botany department of the Imperial College of Science and Technology in London that year, becoming a research assistant (1933), and rising to demonstrator (1934) and assistant lecturer in mycology and pathology (1937). Her research work was acknowledged in the award of PhD (1935) and DSc degrees (1944) from the University of London. Her career was interrupted by the Second World War; she remained at Imperial's London site teaching under difficult conditions, while Brown and others from the department moved to Slough. Michael J. Carlile comments on her relatively slow promotion at Imperial, despite being highly active in both research and teaching, speculating that it might have been due to her not having contacts.

In 1945 she was appointed lecturer at the University of Bristol, rising to reader in mycology (1948) and holding the chair in mycology from 1965, one of the early women to hold a chair at the university. In 1970–73, she served as the science faculty's dean. Bristol's first to be a woman. Her colleagues included Carlile and Michael F. Madelin. After her retirement in 1973, she held an emeritus professorship, She participated in the university's studies of proposals for a Severn Barrage including as co-editor of the report.

A "conscientious", "enthusiastic and committed" teacher, Hawker's contributions to university-level education in mycology have been described as "impressive". She served on the British Mycological Society's committee investigating this topic in the 1940s. She helped to found the University of Bristol's degree course in microbiology, which under her influence included mycology, and co-edited two microbiology textbooks which included fungi. She visited the United States in 1965, investigating how practical laboratory work – a particular enthusiasm of hers – fit into university-level education.

Hawker served as president of the British Mycological Society in 1955, and was also elected an honorary member of the society (1975), as well as of the Mycological Society of America (1966). In 1966, she organised Bristol's Colston Symposium on the topic of "The Fungal Spore", which founded the International Fungus Spore Symposium series. The following symposium (1974) in Utah was dedicated to her, as well as the American plant pathologist David Gottlieb, and in 1988, Transactions of the British Mycological Society honoured her reaching the age of eighty.

== Research and writings ==
Hawker's initial research was in the field of plant physiology. She studied geotropism, the way in which plants respond to gravity, which resulted in four useful papers published in 1932–33. She also researched the auxin group of plant growth hormones.

At Imperial in the mid-1930s, Hawker began to research fungal physiology, and in particular spore production. She initially chose to study the ascomycete fungus Sordaria destruens (formerly Melanospora destruens), and investigated the factors affecting its spore production, such as the type of carbohydrate that it is growing on. At Bristol she studied reproduction in the zygomycete fungus Rhizopus sexualis, identifying a volatile factor that promotes spore formation, which Graham Gooday and others identified as trisporic acid and related compounds. She continued to study what triggered fungi to switch from vegetative growth to the reproductive phase for more than two decades. At the end of the 1950s, she abandoned this line of research in favour of observing the ultrastructural changes that occur during the production and germination of spores, and published prolifically on this topic from 1963 until her retirement. These studies were facilitated when the Bristol botany department purchased an electron microscope in around 1960; she was among the earliest British researchers to take electron micrographs of fungal structures.

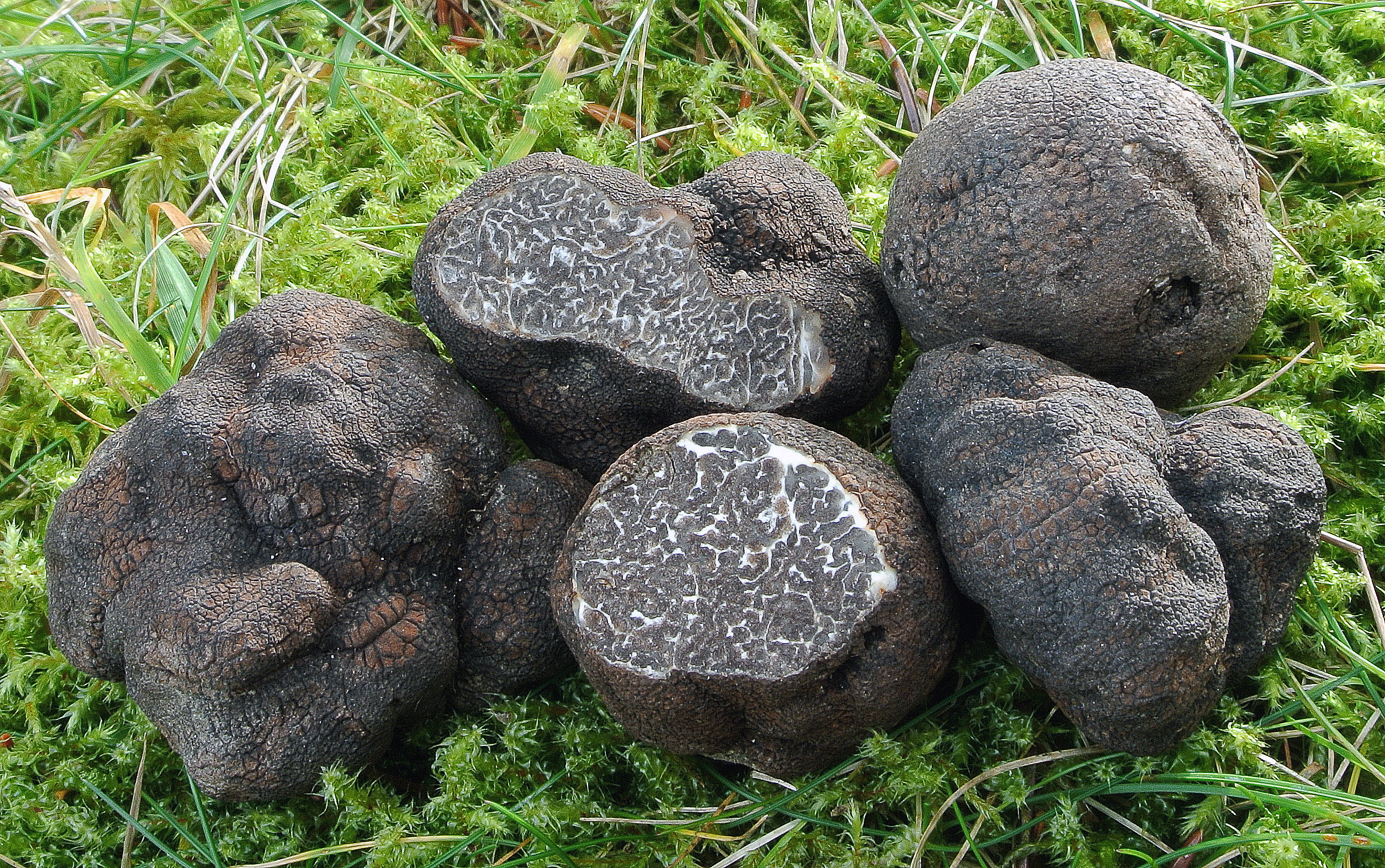
Tuber macrosporum, one of the species of truffle that Hawker identified in England

In the mid-1930s she also researched fungal diseases affecting plants cultivated for their flowers, especially narcissus and gladiolus, for example, basal rot caused by Fusarium species. She later studied arbuscular mycorrhizas – the symbiotic relationship between root-colonising fungi and many plant species – with her experiments suggesting that the coloniser was often Pythium; however, Barbara Mosse showed that it was instead fungi of the order Glomerales.

Her interests extended to macroscopic fungi. In 1934, with Terence Ingold, Hawker studied fungal distribution in the Mortimer area, near Reading. In 1948, she started to investigate the distribution in Britain of hypogeous fungi, known as truffles: fungi with underground fruiting bodies. She is said to have "revived the study of truffles in England"; before her work this group had not been studied since the Victorian era, and they were believed to be rare in the country. In 1948–59, she found 1200 specimens from at least 60 species within 25 miles of Bristol. Her research resulted in a 1954 monograph, and was described in 2005 as still "unequalled."

Hawker is described as writing "fluently and with great speed." She published Physiology of Fungi (1950), one of the earliest books on the topic, and followed it up with Physiology of Reproduction in Fungi (1957). Her undergraduate text Fungi: An Introduction (1960) surveys fungal diversity. She also co-edited two textbooks on microbiology with Alan H. Linton and others, An Introduction to the Biology of Micro-organisms (1960) and Micro-organisms: Function, Form and Environment (1971).

== Personal life ==
Hawker is not recorded as having married, and in later life she lacked close relatives. Her main recreation was painting in watercolours, and after retirement in oils. She died in 1991. Her will included a large legacy to the University of Bristol, which named a laboratory in her memory.

== Selected works ==
Authored books

- Lilian E. Hawker. Fungi: An Introduction (1960; Hillary House; 1966)
- Lilian E. Hawker. Physiology of Reproduction in Fungi (Cambridge University Press; 1957)
- Lilian E. Hawker. Physiology of Fungi (University of London Press; 1950)

Co-edited books

- Lilian E. Hawker, A. H. Linton (eds). Micro-organisms: Function, Form and Environment (Edward Arnold; 1971; University Park Press; 1979)
- Lilian E. Hawker, Alan H. Linton, B. F. Folkes, M. J. Carlile (eds). An Introduction to the Biology of Micro-organisms (Edward Arnold; 1960)

Monograph, reviews

- Lilian E. Hawker (1965). "Fine structure of fungi as revealed by electron microscopy", Biological Reviews 40: 52–91 doi:10.1111/j.1469-185X.1965.tb00795.x
- Lilian E. Hawker (1954). "British hypogeous fungi" Philosophical Transactions of the Royal Society B: Biological Sciences 237: 429–546 doi:10.1098/rstb.1954.0002

Research papers

- Lilian E. Hawker, R. J. Hendy (1963). "An electron-microscope study of germination of conidia of Botrytis cinerea", Journal of General Microbiology 33: 43–46 doi:10.1099/00221287-33-1-43
- Lilian E. Hawker, Patricia McV. Abbott (1963). "An electron microscope study of maturation and germination of sporangiospores of two species of Rhizopus" Journal of General Microbiology 32: 295–298 doi:10.1099/00221287-32-2-295
- R. P. Asthana, L. E. Hawker (1936). "The influence of certain fungi on the sporulation of Melanospora destruens Shear and of some other Ascomycetes", Annals of Botany 50: 325–343 JSTOR 43237818
- Lilian E. Hawker (1932). "A quantitative study of the geotropism of seedlings with special reference to the nature and development of their statolith apparatus", Annals of Botany 46: 121–157 JSTOR 43237364
