= Vernon H. Blackman =

British botanist (1872–1967)

- Blackman in 1944.
- Born: 8 January 1872
- Died: 1 October 1967 (aged 95)
- Occupation: Botanist
- Known for: Fungal cytology; plant physiology research

Vernon Herbert Blackman (8 January 1872 – 1 October 1967) was a British botanist who specialised in fungal cytology and plant physiology, described as "one of the chief architects" of 20th-century British plant physiology. His research focused on sexual reproduction in fungi, growth in plants, and various practical agricultural topics.

He was professor of botany at the University of Leeds (1907–11), and then spent the remainder of his career at the Imperial College of Science and Technology, London, as professor of plant physiology and pathology (later plant physiology) (1911–37), director of the Research Institute of Plant Physiology (1913–43), and director of biological sciences and head of botany (1929–37). He was an elected fellow of the Royal Society (1913) and served as editor of Annals of Botany (1922–47).

== Early life and education ==
Blackman was born in 1872 in Lambeth, London, to Catherine Elizabeth, the daughter of Portland Prison's medical superintendent Charles Maynard Frost, and Frederick Blackman, a doctor. He was a middle child in a large family, with the plant physiologist Frederick Frost Blackman being the elder of his two older brothers. V. H. Blackman was educated at the City of London School and King's College School. In 1889, he started preclinical medical training at the medical school of St Bartholomew's Hospital, but decided against becoming a doctor, and in 1892 followed his older brothers to St John's College, Cambridge. There he read natural sciences, specialising in botany, and graduated in 1895. Among his lecturers was Francis Darwin on plant physiology.

== Career ==
He spent a year in Bonn, Germany (1895–96) in the laboratory of the well-known cytologist, Eduard Strasburger. On his return, he took up a position as an assistant at the Natural History Museum in London, in the mycological section, under George R. M. Murray and later A. B. Rendle. He also gave occasional lecture courses at several University of London institutions, and was a fellow of St John's College, Cambridge (1898–1904). In 1907–11, he was professor of botany at the University of Leeds, after the previous chair in biology was split.

In 1911, Blackman became the first professor of plant physiology and pathology at Imperial College of Science and Technology in London, where he spent the remainder of his career. He soon gained funding for a new Research Institute of Plant Physiology, established in 1913 based at Imperial College but encompassed workers at other research institutes; he was the first director. Before the First World War, he gave lectures on plant pathology at Imperial, which were some of the earliest university lectures in Britain on the topic; this course was taken over by his student William Brown, who became professor of plant pathology in 1928, with Blackman continuing to hold the chair in plant physiology until 1937. From 1929, he was also director of biological sciences and head of botany at Imperial College. On reaching the compulsory retirement age in 1937, he became an emeritus professor of the University of London, but remained the director of the Research Institute of Plant Physiology until 1943, guiding its administration through the early years of the Second World War. Helen Porter, in his Royal Society memoir, calls him "one of the chief architects" of 20th-century British plant physiology.

He served on numerous university and government committees and governing bodies, including chairing the Forest Products Research Board, the Water Pollution Board and the Advisory Council of the Department of Scientific and Industrial Research. He continued to publish on botanical subjects into the mid-1950s, and remained associated with the East Malling Research Station until 1960. A research studentship was established there in his memory in 1957 for work relating to fruit.

== Research ==
His earliest research, begun as an undergraduate, was on fertilisation in Pinus sylvestris. Early during his time at the Natural History Museum, he accompanied Murray to the West Indies; they collected marine phytoplankton by having sea water pumped through silk bags, and published drawings of the shells in 1898. Their haul included two luminous specimens, which Blackman studied. He then researched sexual reproduction and cytology in fungi, particularly rusts.

After joining Imperial College, Blackman's focus shifted to plant physiology and agriculture. He researched growth in plants, publishing an influential paper in 1919 that proposes a mathematical equation to model growth and introduces the "efficiency index" constant, later termed the relative growth rate. At Imperial College he promoted a detailed quantitative approach to research, together with efforts to model the results mathematically. With collaborators across the country, he worked on many practical agricultural topics including plant nutrition, and chemical and physiological changes in fruit during ripening and storage.

== Awards and societies ==
He was elected a fellow of the Royal Society in 1913, served as president of the British Association's botanical section (1924), and was a founder member of the Biochemical Society and of the British Mycological Society. He was awarded honorary degrees by the University of Allahabad and the Hindu University of Benares during a visit to India in 1937–38.

He was a member of the Annals of Botany Company (1922–53) and the editor of their academic journal Annals of Botany (1922–47); a news item in Nature noting his retirement from the editorship comments that nearly all British botanists, as well as many botanists internationally, would have been influenced by him during his long tenure at the journal.

== Personal life ==
On 6 June 1901, he married Edith Delta Emett (Note: Also given as Emmett) (1876/7–1940), whose father Joseph Emett was an accountant. She was a sculptor who had learned from her aunt E. S. Mogridge to make models in wax, including flowers and insects, for museum displays and private collections. They had a daughter and two sons; Geoffrey Emett Blackman was a plant physiologist who became the University of Oxford's Sibthorpian professor of rural economy. After his first wife's death, Blackman married Thérèse Elizabeth Panisset (born 1904/5), whose father Sydney Panisset was a research chemist.

Blackman was particularly known for his "meticulous" language, serving as treasurer of the English Association (1953–59). For much of his life, he lived in Wimbledon, where he died on 1 October 1967. His remains were cremated.

== Selected publications ==
- V. H. Blackman (1919). The compound interest law and plant growth. Annals of Botany 33 (131): 353–60 JSTOR 43236859
- Vernon H. Blackman (1904). On the fertilisation, alternation of generations, and general cytology of the Uredineae. Annals of Botany 18 (71): 323–73 JSTOR 43235254
- George Murray, Vernon H. Blackman (1898). VI. On the nature of the coccospheres and rhabdospheres. Philosophical Transactions of the Royal Society B: Biological Sciences 190: 427–41 doi:10.1098/rstb.1898.0006
