= William Brown (plant pathologist) =

British mycologist and plant pathologist

William Brown in 1945

William Brown FRS (17 February 1888 – 18 January 1975) was a British mycologist and plant pathologist, known for his ground-breaking research on fungal physiology and the physiology of plant parasitism by fungi, carried out in 1912–28. Born in rural Scotland and educated at the University of Edinburgh, he spent nearly all his career at the Imperial College of Science and Technology in London, where he created the plant pathology research school in the 1920s, becoming Britain's first professor of plant pathology in 1928, and heading the department of botany (1938–53). He was president of the Association of Applied Biologists and the British Mycological Society. He studied Botrytis cinerea, which causes grey mould in a variety of plants, and various Fusarium species that attack apples.

== Early life and education ==
Brown was born in 1888 at Middlebie, near Annan in Dumfriesshire, Scotland, to Margaret (née Broatch) and Gavin Brown, who worked at repairing agricultural mills and was later a smallholder. He had an elder brother. The family moved to between Cummertrees and Ruthwell soon after his birth, and he was educated at Cummertrees village school and Annan Academy, while working on the family smallholding. He went up to Edinburgh University in 1904, obtaining an MA degree in mathematics (1908), having also studied physics, chemistry, geology and botany, and a BSc in petrology, invertebrate zoology, botany and plant physiology (1910), winning many medals for his work. Also at Edinburgh at the time were the entomologist James Watson Munro and the mathematician Hyman Levy, later both at Imperial.

== Career ==
In 1910–12, Brown worked as a lecturer in plant physiology at Edinburgh's department of botany, and during this period he may also have taught at Heriot-Watt College. In 1912–16, he researched in the department of botany of Imperial College of Science and Technology in London, under Vernon H. Blackman, gaining a DSc degree from the University of London in 1916. That year he obtained a research assistant post at the Research Institute of Plant Physiology at Imperial College (1916–18), which was interrupted by a brief stint at Oldbury near Birmingham, manufacturing horse serum. He rose to research physiologist (1918–23), assistant professor of physiological pathology at Imperial College and reader at the University of London (1923–28), professor of plant pathology (1928–53) – Britain's earliest professorship in this discipline – and then head of the department of botany (1938–53). Brown retired from Imperial in 1953, becoming an emeritus professor, and in 1954 held a visiting professorship at Cornell University in the United States. On his return he largely gave up scientific work but served as the assistant editor of the Journal of Horticultural Science until 1969.

His earliest publications were in 1915. The basic research for which he is best known was carried out in 1912–28, and Brown subsequently concentrated on teaching and supervising research students. He is credited with creating the Imperial College's plant pathology research school in the 1920s. As head of department from 1938, Brown also had heavy administrative duties, particularly managing the removal of the department to the College Research Station at Slough during the Second World War, when the botany department was taken over by the military, and its post-war reinstatement in South Kensington. Notable students include Geoff Baylis, John Colhoun, Denis Garrett, Philip H. Gregory, Lilian E. Hawker, Michael F. Madelin and Ronald K. S. Wood.

Brown was elected a fellow of the Royal Society in 1938, and served on the society's council (1946–48). He was president of the Association of Applied Biologists (1943–44; 1953–54) and of the British Mycological Society (1933–34), and also a sectional president of the British Association for the Advancement of Science (1951). He was appointed an honorary member of the British Mycological Society (1963) and a fellow of the Institute of Biology (1963). He served on the governing bodies of several institutions including the Chelsea Physic Garden, East Malling Research Station, John Innes Institute and the Plant Breeding Institute.

== Research ==
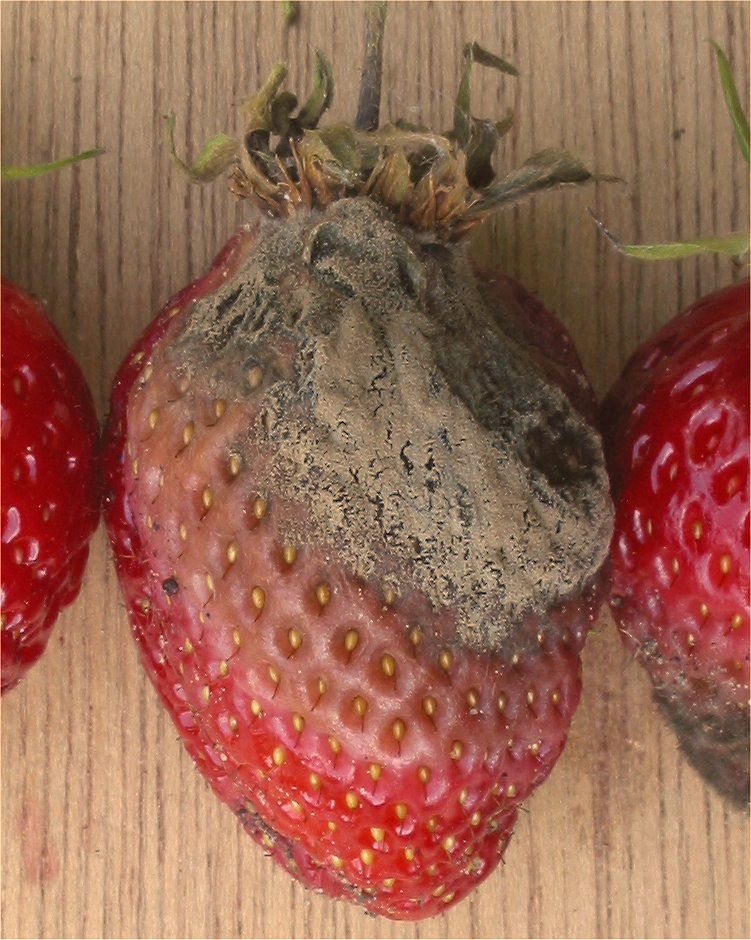
Grey mould on a strawberry; Brown researched how the causative agent Botrytis cinerea parasitises its plant hosts

The earliest strand of Brown's research was on the physiology of plant parasitism by fungi and the host–parasite interaction. He used Botrytis cinerea as a model system, which causes grey mould, a type of fungal soft rot, in many different plants; he chose lettuce and broad bean for hosts. Anton de Bary and H. Marshall Ward had previously shown in other soft rots that the damage was partly due to breakdown of the plant cell wall structure by an unidentified enzyme and partly from the fungus killing the plant protoplasts. Brown identified fungal pectinase enzymes produced at the ends of young hyphae (filaments) as the cause of both effects. He studied infection by germinating fungal spores, demonstrating that nutrients from the leaf or petal pass through the plant's cuticle and help the germinating spore to grow and infect. He also discovered that nutrients diffuse out of pollen grains, which have subsequently been shown also to facilitate fungal infection. With C. C. Harvey, he investigated in detail how the fungus breaks through the protective cuticle layer to infect the plant, showing that a specialised needle-like hypha pushes through the cuticle purely mechanically by growing through it, without involving any enzyme action. They also showed that if the underlying plant tissue is plasmolysed (flaccid) then it is less able to resist penetration.

In the 1920s, Brown also studied basic fungal physiology in the laboratory, particularly fungal growth. In experiments with various species of mould that spoil stored apples, he studied the effect on fungal germination and growth of factors including oxygen and carbon dioxide levels and temperature. He showed that high carbon dioxide and low temperature each separately inhibit germination and growth, but the greatest effect is achieved using both measures together. His results had obvious practical applications for fruit storage methods. He also showed that factors inhibiting fungal growth are most effective when what he termed the fungal "energy of growth" is low. This principle has wide applications to fungal behaviour in nature. In 1924–28, Brown carried out extensive studies of growth in several species of Fusarium that attack apples (partly in collaboration with A. S. Horne), which at the time were among the most detailed studies of any fungal species. This research also uncovered major problems in the classification of the Fusarium genus, contributing to its reclassification in 1941.

In the 1930s his research focus shifted to field studies of plant diseases, particularly those afflicting local market-garden produce, mainly lettuce but also potatoes, sea kale and carnations. With M. J. Smieton, he showed that pentachloronitrobenzene could protect lettuce against B. cinerea. During the Second World War he researched crop plants, while the department also raised crops for food. He also published and gave lectures in the 1950s and 1960s on the history of microbiology and mycology.

== Personal life ==
In 1921, Brown married Lucy Doris Allen (1895–1966), a botanist, biochemist and chemist with a degree from Bedford College, London, who was the daughter of a shipping agent. They had three daughters and a son; his eldest daughter Lucy M. Brown became an academic at the London School of Economics. They lived in Battersea (1921–29), Windsor (1929–33) and Hanwell (1933–54), moving to Haddenham, Buckinghamshire in his retirement. His recreations included gardening and reading Latin and Greek in the original. After his wife's death, Brown lived with his daughter Lucy in London and then another daughter in Cheshire. He died in 1975, in Stalybridge, Greater Manchester. His estate was valued at nearly £18,000.

== Selected publications ==
Reviews

- William Brown (1965). "Toxins and cell-wall dissolving enzymes in relation to plant disease", Annual Review of Phytopathology 3: 1–21 doi:10.1146/annurev.py.03.090165.000245 (his final publication)

Research papers

- William Brown (1922). "On the germination and growth of fungi at various temperatures and in various concentrations of oxygen and of carbon dioxide", Annals of Botany 36: 257–283 JSTOR 43236384
