= Specific leaf area =

Quotient of leaf area to leaf dry mass

Specific leaf area (SLA) is the quotient of leaf area to leaf dry mass; it has SI units of square centimeters per kilogram (cm²/kg). The inverse of SLA is leaf mass per area (LMA), with SI units of kilogram per square centimeters (kg/cm²).

== Rationale ==
Specific leaf area is a ratio indicating how much leaf area a plant builds with a given amount of leaf biomass:

$SLA \ = \ \frac{A}{M_L}$

where A is the area of a given leaf or all leaves of a plant, and M_{L} is the dry mass of those leaves. Typical units are m^{2}/kg or mm^{2}/mg.

Leaf mass per area (LMA) is its inverse and can mathematically be decomposed in two component variables, leaf thickness (LTh) and leaf density (LD):

$LMA \ = \ \frac{M_L}{A} \ = LTh.LD$

Typical units are g/m^{2} for LMA, μm for LTh and g/mL for LD.

Both SLA and LMA are frequently used in plant ecology and biology. SLA is one of the components in plant growth analysis, and mathematically scales positively and linearly with the relative growth rate of a plant. LMA mathematically scales positively with the investments plants make per unit leaf area (amount of protein and cell wall; cell number per area) and with leaf longevity. Since linear, positive relationships are more easily analysed than inverse negative relationships, researchers often use either variable, depending on the type of questions asked.

== Normal ranges ==
Normal ranges of SLA and LMA are species-dependent and influenced by growth environment. Table 1 gives normal ranges (~10th and ~90th percentiles) for species growing in the field, for well-illuminated leaves. Aquatic plants generally have very low LMA values, with particularly low numbers reported for species such as Myriophyllum farwelli (2.8 g/m^{2}) and Potamogeton perfoliatus (3.9 g/m^{2}). Evergreen shrubs and Gymnosperm trees as well as succulents have particularly high LMA values, with highest values reported for Aloe saponaria (2010 g/m^{2}) and Agave deserti (2900 g/m^{2}).

Table 1. Normal ranges of SLA and LMA for plant species growing in the field.
		SLA (m^{2}/kg)		LMA (g/m^{2})	
Normal Range		low	high	low	high
Herbaceous species	Aquatic plants	15	210	4	65
Herbaceous species	Ferns	10	45	20	95
Herbaceous species	Forbs	8	35	25	130
Herbaceous species	Grasses	4	30	35	225
Herbaceous species	Succulents	2	12	85	510
Woody species	Deciduous shrubs	9	27	35	110
Woody species	Deciduous woody species	8	25	40	120
Woody species	Evergreen shrubs	2	15	65	380
Woody species	Evergreen Angiosperm trees	8	23	40	120
Woody species	Evergreen Gymnosperm trees	2	11	90	470

== Application ==
Specific leaf area can be used to estimate the reproductive strategy of a particular plant based upon light and moisture (humidity) levels, among other factors. Specific leaf area is one of the most widely accepted key leaf characteristics used during the study of leaf traits.

== Changes in response to drought ==
Drought and water stress have varying effects on specific leaf area. In a variety of species, drought decreases specific leaf area. For example, under drought conditions, leaves were, on average, smaller than leaves on control plants. This is a logical observation, as a relative decrease in surface area would mean that there would be fewer ways for water to be lost. Species with typically low specific leaf area values are geared for the conservation of acquired resources, due to their large dry matter content, high concentrations of cell walls and secondary metabolites, and high leaf and root longevity.

In some other species, such as Poplar trees, specific leaf area will decrease overall, but there will be an increase in specific leaf area until the leaf has reached its final size. After the final size has been reached, the specific leaf area will then begin decreasing.

Other research has shown increasing specific leaf area values in plants under water limitation. An example of increasing specific leaf area values as a result of drought stress is the birch tree species. Birch tree specific leaf area values significantly increased after two dry seasons, though the authors did note that, in typical cases, lowered specific leaf area values are seen as an adaptation to drought stress.

== See also ==
- Hemispherical photography
- Leaf Area Index
- Photosynthetically active radiation
- Plant growth analysis
