= Canon EF 15mm lens =

Canon SLR EF-mount prime lens

EF 15mm f/2.8
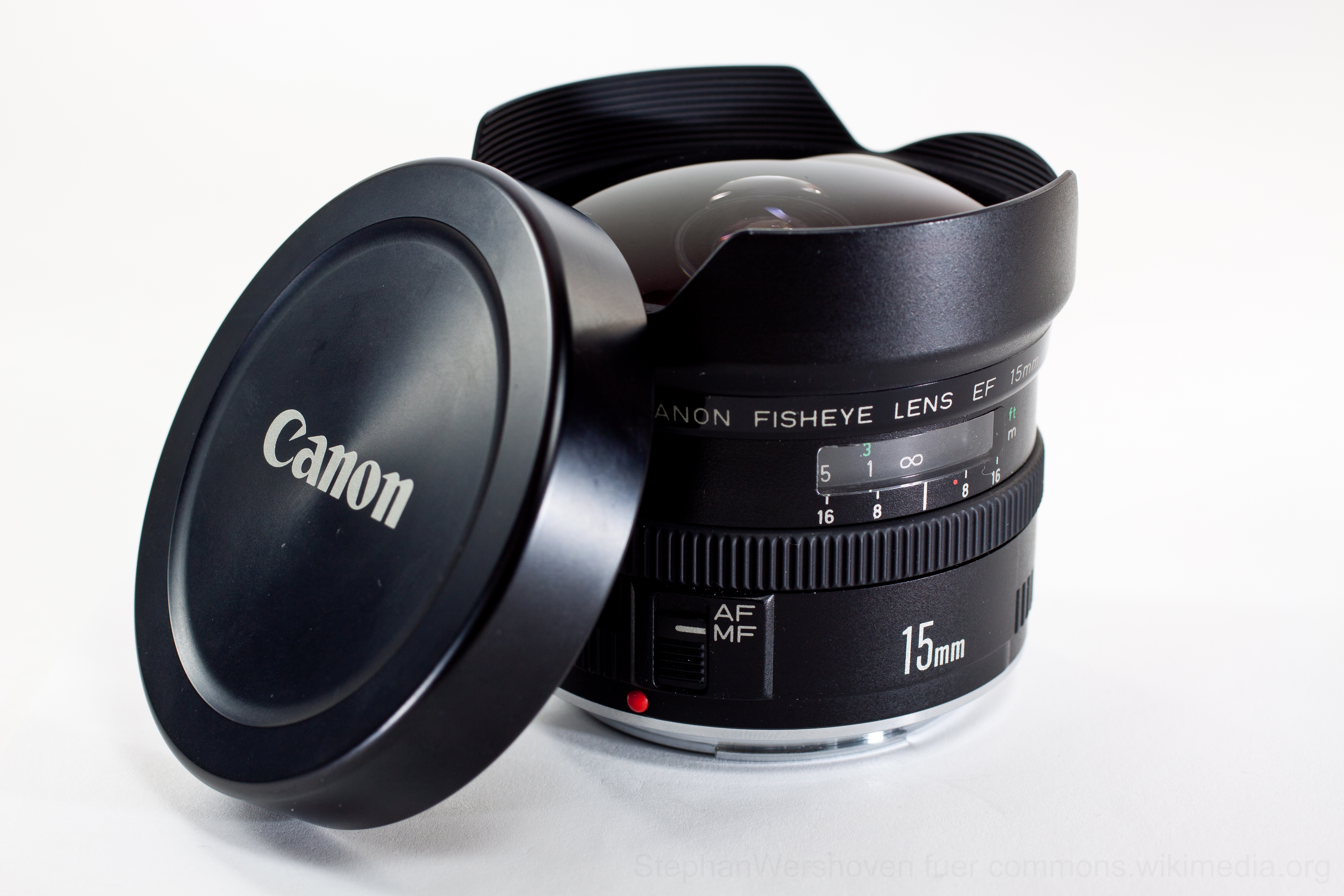
- Maker: Canon

Technical data
- Type: Ultra-Wide-Angle, Prime Lens
- Focal length: 15mm
- Crop factor: 1.0
- Aperture (max/min): f/2.8 - f/22
- Close focus distance: 0.2 m (7.9 in)
- Max. magnification: 0.14x
- Diaphragm blades: 5
- Construction: 8 elements in 7 groups

Features
- Short back focus: No No
- Ultrasonic motor: No No
- Lens-based stabilization: No No
- Macro capable: No No
- Unique features: Fisheye
- Application: Special Effect

Physical
- Max. length: 62.2 mm (2.4 in)
- Diameter: 73.0 mm (2.9 in)
- Weight: 330g (11.6 oz)
- Filter diameter: Built-in gelatin filter holder

Accessories
- Lens hood: Built-in
- Case: LP814

Angle of view
- Diagonal: 180°

History
- Introduction: April 1987
- Discontinuation: June 2011

Retail info
- MSRP: 719.99 USD

The Canon EF 15mm f/2.8 was a fisheye lens produced by Canon from 1987 to 2011. The lens was compatible with all EF camera bodies but only intended for full-frame configurations, as the fisheye effect is much less pronounced with a cropped sensor (APS-C).

In 2010 Canon announced the EF 8–15mm f/4L Fisheye USM which replaced the EF 15mm f/2.8.

== Angle of view ==
Unlike the Canon EF 8-15mm lens which replaced it, the EF 15mm is a full-frame fisheye lens, not a circular fisheye lens.

This means that it provides a full 180° angle of view only across the diagonal; it does not provide a complete hemispherical view, and is not suitable for hemispherical photography.
