= Biomass allocation =

Concept in plant biology

Biomass allocation is a concept in plant biology which indicates the relative proportion of plant biomass present in the different organs of a plant. It can also be used for whole plant communities.

== Rationale ==
Different organs of plants serve different functions. Leaves generally intercept light and fix carbon, roots take up water and nutrients, and stems and petioles display the leaves in a favourable position and transport various compounds within the plant. Depending on environmental conditions, plants may change their investment scheme, to make plants with relatively bigger root systems, or more leaves. This balance has been suggested to be a ‘functional equilibrium’, with plants that experience low water or nutrient supply investing more in roots, and plants growing under low light or CO_{2} conditions investing more in leaves or stems. Alternatively, it is also known as the 'balanced growth hypothesis', or the 'optimal partitioning theory'. Next to environmentally-induced changes, there are also inherent differences in biomass allocation between species, and changes that depend on the age or size of plants.

== Related concepts ==
Biomass allocation is the result of a number of processes which take place in the plant. It starts with the way sugars are allocated to different organs after having been fixed by the leaves in the process of photosynthesis (sugar allocation). Conceptually this is simple to envisage, but to quantify the flow of sugars is challenging and requires sophisticated machinery. For plants growing under steady state conditions, it is feasible to determine sugar-allocation by constructing a C-budget. This requires determination of the C-uptake by the whole plant during photosynthesis, and the C-losses of shoots and roots during respiration. Further C-losses may occur when sugars and other C-based compounds are exuded by the roots, or disappear as volatiles in the leaves. When these measurements are combined with growth measurements and the C-concentrations present in the biomass of leaves, stems and roots, C-budgets can be constructed from which sugar allocation is derived.

These C-budgets are instructive, but require extensive measurements. A next level of analysis is to measure the growth allocation: what is the increase in total biomass of a plant, and to what extent is the increase due to growth of leaves, of stems and of roots. In young plants, growth allocation is often quite similar to the actual biomass allocation. But especially in trees, there may be a high yearly turnover in leaves and fine roots, and a low turnover in stems, branches and thick roots. In those cases, the allocation of growth and the final biomass allocation may diverge quite strongly over the years.

There have been attempts to give these three different levels of allocation different names (a.o. partitioning, distribution, fractionation), but so far they have been applied inconsistently.
The fractions of biomass present in leaves and roots are also relevant variables in Plant growth analysis.

== Calculation and units ==
A common way to characterize the biomass allocation of a vegetative plant is to separate the plant in the organs of interest (e.g. leaves, stems, roots) and determine the biomass of these organs – generally on a dry mass basis - independently. The Leaf Mass Fraction (LMF) is then calculated as leaf dry mass / total plant dry mass, the Stem Mass Fraction (SMF) as stem dry mass / total plant dry mass, and Root Mass Fraction (RMF) as root dry mass / total plant dry mass. Generally, units are g g^{−1} (g organ / g total plant biomass).

For generative plants, there is the additional compartment related to reproduction (flowers and flower stalks, seeds or fruits). The relative amount of biomass present in this compartment is often indicated as 'Reproductive Effort'. A related variable which is often used in agronomy is the 'Harvest index'. Because roots are seldom harvested, the harvest index is the amount of marketable product (often the seeds), relative to the total above-ground biomass.

Alternative terminology that has been used are Leaf, Stem and Root Mass Ratios, or shoot:root or root:shoot ratios. The latter two convey less information, as they do not discriminate between leaves and stems.

== Normal ranges ==
Young herbaceous plants generally have LMF values in the range of 0.3–0.7 g g^{−1} (0.5 on average), SMF values ranging from 0.04 - 0.4 (0.2 on average), and RMF values between 0.1 and 0.5 (0.3 on average). Young tree seedlings have values in the same range. For older and bigger plants, the LMF decreases and SMF increases. For large trees (> 1000 kg) LMF is below 0.05, SMF around 0.8 and RMF around 0.2 g g^{−1}. At that stage most of the stem biomass consists of highly lignified material, which still may serve the important function of contributing to the support function of stems, but is physiologically not active anymore.

== Environmental effects ==
The effect of the environment generally is as expected from the ‘functional equilibrium’ concept: plants decrease LMF and increase RMF when grown at high light levels as compared to low light. At low nutrient levels they invest more in roots and less in leaves as compared to high nutrient supply. However, changes are often smaller at different water supply, and effects of CO_{2} concentration, UV-B radiation, ozone and salinity on allocation are generally negligible. Plants growing at higher temperature mostly decrease RMF and increase LMF.

A point of attention in the analysis of mass fractions is whether or not to correct for differences in size, when comparing plants that have been treated differently, or in the comparison of species. The rationale behind this is that mass factions often change with plant size (and developmental phase), and different treatments may have caused growth differences as well. Thus, for an assessment of whether plants actively changed their allocation scheme, plants of similar size should be compared. If size corrections are required, one could do an allometric analysis. A simple alternative is to plot mass fractions against total plant mass.

== Differences between species ==
Species of different families may have different allocation patterns. For example, species belonging to the Solanaceae have high LMF values, whereas Fagaceae have low LMF values, even after size-corrections. Grasses generally have lower LMF values that herbaceous dicots, with a much higher proportion of their biomass present in roots. Large evergreen trees have a larger fraction of their biomass allocated to leaves (LMF ~0.04) than deciduous species (LMF ~0.01).

== See also ==
- Allometry
- Biomass partitioning
- Plant growth analysis
