= Plant growth analysis =

Plant growth analysis refers to a set of concepts and equations by which changes in size of plants over time can be summarised and dissected in component variables. It is often applied in the analysis of growth of individual plants, but can also be used in a situation where crop growth is followed over time.

== Absolute size ==
In comparing different treatments, genotypes or species, the simplest type of growth analysis is to evaluate size of plants after a certain period of growth, typically from the time of germination. In plant biology, size is often measured as dry mass of whole plants (M), or the above-ground part of it. In high-throughput phenotyping platforms, the amount of green pixels as derived from photographs taken from plants from various directions is often the variable that is used to estimate plant size.

== Absolute growth rate (AGR) ==
In the case that plant size was determined at more than one occasion, the increase in size over a given time period can be determined. The Absolute Growth Rate (AGR) is temporal rate of change of size (mass).

$AGR = \lim_{\Delta t \to 0} {\Delta M\over \Delta t} = {dM\over dt}$

where M is the change in mass of the plant during time t, respectively.
Absolute size at the end of an experiment then depends on seed mass, germination time, and the integration of AGR over all time steps measured.

== Relative growth rate (RGR) ==
AGR is not constant, especially not in the first phases of plant growth. When there are enough resources available (light, nutrients, water), the increase of biomass after germination will be more or less proportional to the mass of the plant already present: small right after germination, larger when plants become bigger. Blackman (1919) was the first to recognize that this was similar to money accumulating in a bank account, with the increase determined by compounding interest. He applied the same mathematical formula to describe plant size over time.

The equation for exponential mass growth rate in plant growth analysis is often expressed as:

$M(t) = M_0\exp(RGR\cdot t)$

Where:

- M(t) is the final mass of the plant at time (t).
- M_{0} is the initial mass of the plant.
- RGR is the relative growth rate.

RGR can then be written as:

$RGR \ = \ \frac{1}{M} \frac{dM}{dt}$

In the case of two harvests, RGR can be simply calculated as

$RGR \ = \ {\operatorname{\ln(M_2) \ - \ \ln(M_1)}\over\operatorname{t_2 \ - \ t_1}\!}$

In the case of more harvests, a linear equation can be fitted through the ln-transformed size data. The slope of this line gives an estimate of the average RGR for the period under investigation, with units of g.g^{−1}.day^{−1}. A time-course of RGR can be estimated by fitting a non-linear equation through the ln-transformed size data, and calculating the derivative with respect to time. For plants RGR values are typically (much) smaller than 1 g.g^{−1}.day^{−1}. Therefore, values are often reported in mg.g^{−1}.day^{−1}, with normal ranges for young, herbaceous species between 50–350 mg.g^{−1}.day^{−1}, and values for tree seedlings of 10–100 mg.g^{−1}.day^{−1}.

== RGR components (LAR and ULR) ==
Soon after its inception, the RGR concept was expanded by a simple extension of the RGR equation:

$RGR \ = \ \frac{A}{M} \ . \ \frac{1}{A}\frac{dM}{dt} \ = \ LAR\ . \ ULR$

where A is the total leaf area of a plant. The first component is called the 'Leaf Area Ratio' (LAR) and indicates how much leaf area there is per unit total plant mass. For young plants, values are often in the range of 1–20 m^{2} kg^{−1}, for tree seedlings they are generally less. The second component is the 'Unit Leaf Rate' (ULR), which is also termed 'Net Assimilation Rate' (NAR). This variable indicates the rate of biomass increase per unit leaf area, with typical values ranging from 5-15 g.m^{−2}.day^{−1} for herbaceous species and 1-5 g.m^{−2}.day^{−1} for woody seedlings. Although the ULR is not equal to the rate of photosynthesis per unit leaf area, both values are often well correlated.
The LAR can be further subdivided into two other variables that are relevant for plant biology: Specific leaf area (SLA) and Leaf Mass Fraction (LMF). SLA is the leaf area of a plant (or a given leaf) divided by leaf mass. LMF characterizes the fraction of total plant biomass that is allocated to leaves. In formula:

$RGR \ = \ \frac{A}{M_L} \ . \ \frac{M_L}{M}\ . \ \frac{1}{A}\frac{dM}{dt} \ = \ SLA\ . \ LMF \ . \ ULR$

where M_{L} is the mass of the leaves.
Thus, by sequentially harvesting leaf, stem, and root biomass as well as determining leaf area, deeper insight can be achieved in the various components of a plant and how they together determine whole plant growth.

== Alternative ways to decompose RGR ==
As much as RGR can be seen from the perspective of C-economy, by calculating leaf area and photosynthesis, it could equally well be approached from the perspective of organic N concentration, and the rate of biomass increase per unit organic N:

$RGR \ = \ \frac{N}{M} \ . \ \frac{1}{N}\frac{dM}{dt} \ = \ PNC\ . \ NP$

where N is total plant organic Nitrogen, PNC is the plant organic nitrogen concentration, and NP, the nitrogen productivity, the increase in biomass per unit organic N present.

Another way to break down RGR is to consider biomass increase from the perspective of a nutrient (element) and its uptake rate by the roots. RGR can then be rewritten as a function of the Root Mass Fraction (RMF), the concentration of that element in the plant and the specific uptake rate of roots for the element of interest. Under the condition that the concentration of the element of interest remains constant (i.e. dE/dM = E/M), RGR can be also written as:

$RGR \ = \ = \ \frac{1}{E} \frac{dE}{dt}$,

which can be expanded to:

$RGR \ = \ \frac{M_R}{M} \ . \ \frac{M}{E}\ . \ \frac{1}{M_R}\frac{dE}{dt} \ = \ RMF\ . \ \frac{1}{[E]} \ . \ SAR$

where M_{R} is the mass of the roots, SAR the specific uptake rate of the roots (moles of E taken up per unit root mass and per time), and [E] the concentration of element E in the plant.

== Size-dependence of RGR ==
Although the increase in plant size is more or less proportional to plant mass already present, plants do not grow strictly exponentially. In a period of several days, plant growth rate will vary because of diurnal changes in light intensity, and day-to-day differences in the daily light integral. At night, plants will respire and even lose biomass. Over a longer period (weeks to months), RGR will generally decrease because of several reasons. First, the newly formed leaves at the top of the plant will begin to shade lower leaves, and therefore, average photosynthesis per unit area will go down, and so will ULR. Second, non-photosynthetic biomass, especially stems, will increase with plant size. The RGR of trees in particular decreases with increasing size due in part to the large allocation to structural material in the trunk required to hold the leaves up in the canopy. Overall, respiration scales with total biomass, but photosynthesis only scales with photosynthetically active leaf area and as a result growth rate slows down as total biomass increases and LAR decreases. And thirdly, depending on the growth conditions applied, shoot and/or root space may become confined with plant age, or water and/or nutrient supply do not keep pace with plant size and become more and more limiting. One way to 'correct' for these differences is by plotting RGR and their growth components directly against plant size. If RGR specifically is of interest, another approach is to separate size effects from intrinsic growth differences mathematically.

Decomposing the RGR ignores the dependency of plant growth rate on plant size (or allometry) and assumes, incorrectly, that plant growth is directly proportional to total plant size (isometry). As a result RGR analyses assume that size effects are isometric (scaling exponents are 1.0) instead of allometric (exponents less than 1) or hypoallometric (exponents greater than 1). It has been demonstrated that traditional RGR lacks several of the critical traits influencing growth and the allometric dependency of leaf mass and also showed how to incorporate alloemtric dependencies into RGR growth equations. This has been used to derive a generalized trait-based model of plant growth (see also Metabolic Scaling Theory and Metabolic Theory of Ecology) to show how plant size and the allometric scaling of key functional traits interact to regulate variation in whole-plant relative growth rate.

== Growth analysis in agronomy ==
Plant growth analysis is often applied at the individual level to young well-spaced plants grown individually in pots. However, plant growth is also highly relevant in agronomy, where plants are generally grown at high density and to seed maturity. After canopy closure, plant growth is not proportional to size anymore, but changes to linear, with in the end saturation to a maximum value when crops mature. Equations used to describe plant size over time are then often expolinear or sigmoidal.

Agronomic studies often focus on the above-ground part of plant biomass, and consider crop growth rates rather than individual plant growth rates. Nonetheless there is a strong corollary between the two approaches. More specifically, the ULR as discussed above shows up in crop growth analysis as well, as:

$CGR \ = \ \frac{1}{A_g} \ . \ \frac{dM}{dt} \ = \ \frac{A}{A_g} \ .\ \frac{1}{A}\frac{dM}{dt} \ = \ LAI\ . \ ULR$

where CGR is the Crop Growth Rate, the increase in (shoot) biomass per unit ground area, A_{g} the ground area occupied by a crop, A the total amount of leaf area on that ground area, and LAI the Leaf Area Index, the amount of leaf area per unit ground area.

== See also ==
- Biomass allocation
- Relative growth rate
- Specific leaf area
- Theoretical production ecology
