= Ronald Karslake Starr Wood =

British plant pathologist

Ronald Karslake Starr Wood FRS
- Born: 8 April 1919; Ferndale, Wales
- Died: 26 April 2017 (aged 98); London, England
- Education: Imperial College London
- Known for: Physiological plant pathology
- Awards: Otto-Appel-Denkmunze (1978)
- Scientific career
- Fields: Plant pathology
- Workplaces: Imperial College London; University of London
- Doctoral advisor: William Brown
- Doctoral students: Michael Francis Madelin
- Other notable students: George C. Clerk

Ronald Karslake Starr Wood, FRS (8 April 1919 – 26 April 2017) was a pioneer British plant pathologist, and Professor of Plant Pathology at Imperial College London. He was the first academic to be appointed chair in physiological plant pathology in England and Wales. He was also the first president of the British Society for Plant Pathology and the first president of the International Society for Plant Pathology.

== Early life and education ==
Wood was born in the coal-mining town of Ferndale, south Wales, in 1919 to a working-class family. His parents were Percival T. E. Wood and Florence Dix Starr. He was a pupil at the Ferndale Grammar School. He was awarded a Royal Scholarship to attend Imperial College London where he graduated with first class honours in botany; he was a student of William Brown. During World War II, he worked at the Ministry of Aircraft Production. He was awarded a PhD in 1948 from the University of London.

== Career and research ==
At Imperial College, he rose through the ranks from assistant lecturer (1945) through lecturer (1947) and reader (1955) and finally the Foundation Chair of Plant Pathology in the University of London (1964). He was a visiting Regents' Professor at the University of California. He was the doctoral advisor of the British mycologist, Michael Francis Madelin, who had carried out pioneering research in slime moulds and conidial fungi. He was also the secondary advisor to the pioneering Ghanaian plant pathologist, George C. Clerk during his PhD studies. In 1950, he was a Commonwealth Fund Fellow. Additionally, he was a Research Fellow at the Connecticut Agricultural Experimental Station in 1957. Among his other positions were the Director of the NATO Advanced Study Institute in the years 1970, 1975 and 1980. He was the Sir C. V. Raman Professor at the University of Madras in 1980.

His work covered botanical microbial infection, plant disease control, especially of soil-borne biotrophic pathogens and relatively unknown plant diseases. He was author of the major manuscript, Physiological Plant Pathology, which examined the chemical underpinnings of plant disease mechanisms. He also wrote the Phytotoxins in Plant Diseases (1972) and Active defense mechanisms in plants (1982)

== Awards and honours ==
Wood was a Fellow of the American Association for the Advancement of Science. He served as the honorary secretary of the Association of Applied Biologists (AAB) and the chairperson of the Plant Pathology Committee of the British Mycological Society (BMS). From 1981 to 1984, he was he first chairman of the pure and applied biology department and later appointed the Dean of the Royal College of Science. He was elected a Fellow of the Royal Society in 1976 as well as a Fellow of the American Phytopathological Society and a corresponding member of the Deutsche Phytomedizinische Gesellschaft. Wood was the Thurbum Fellow of the University of Sydney in 1979. Additionally, he was one of the earliest honorary members of the British Society for Plant Pathology. He was the Secretary-General of the First Institute Congress of Plant Pathology in 1968. He chaired the Governing Body of the E. Mailing Research Station and served as the governor of the Institute of Horticultural Research. The German Federal Republic awarded Wood the Otto-Appel-Denkmunze in 1978 at the third International Congress of Plant Pathology held in Munich.

== Death ==
Ronald Wood died on 26 April 2017 at the age of 98.

== Works ==
- Physiological plant pathology, Blackwell Scientific, 1967
- Phytotoxins in Plant Diseases, (edited with A. Ballio and A. Graniti) NATO Advanced Study Institute, 1972
- Disease in higher plants, Oxford University Press, 1974, ISBN 0-19-914161-4
- Specificity in Plant Diseases (edited with A. Graniti) 1976,
- Active defense mechanisms in plants Volume 1980, Plenum Press 1982
- Plant Diseases: infection, damage and loss (editor) 1984.
- Physiological Plant Pathology Comes of Age, Annual Review of Phytopathology, Vol. 25: 26-40 (September 1987)
