= Philip Herries Gregory =

British mycologist and phytopathologist

Philip Herries Gregory FRS
- Born: 24 July 1907; Exmouth, Devon, UK
- Died: 9 February 1986 (aged 78)
- Education: Brighton Technical College; Imperial College of Science and Technology
- Notable work: Microbiology of the atmosphere
- Scientific career
- Fields: mycology phytopathology aerobiology
- Workplaces: Imperial College London; Seale-Hayne College; University of Manitoba; Rothamsted Experimental Station

Philip Herries Gregory FRS (24 July 1907 in Exmouth, Devon, UK – 9 February 1986) was a British mycologist and phytopathologist. He established an international reputation as a pioneer of aerobiology and a leading expert on the liberation and dispersal of fungal spores and their relation to plant diseases and to human respiratory diseases. In 1957 he was elected to a one-year term as president of the British Mycological Society.

== Biography ==
During childhood, as a result of severe asthma which prevented him from regular school attendance, Philip H. Gregory had an erratic early education. At age 14 his asthma moderated and he became an enthusiast of outdoor excursions, meteorology, and natural history.

Gregory graduated in 1928 from Brighton Technical College with a B.Sc. (General) degree in botany, chemistry, and zoology. Supported by a Royal Scholarship, he completed the final year of the B.Sc. (Special) degree course in botany at London's Imperial College of Science and Technology. There he did research in botany under the supervision of the plant pathologist William Brown and graduated with a Ph.D. on Fusarium disease in the genus Narcissus. and a D.I.C.

In 1931 George Herbert Pethybridge, a Ph.D. examiner for Gregory, recommended him to Arthur Henry Reginald Buller. The outstanding mycologist Buller had a remarkable research team and was searching for a medical mycologist to work with Andrew M. Davidson, a dermatologist and lecturer at the University of Manitoba in Winnipeg, Manitoba, Canada. Gregory worked with Davidson in Winnipeg for about 3 years from the end of 1931 to the end of 1934 and they coauthored several papers. In 1932 in Winnipeg, Gregory married Margaret F. Culverhouse; they became engaged three years earlier in London.

In early 1935 Philip and Margaret Gregory returned to England. From 1935 to 1940 Gregory did research on flower bulb diseases of Narcissus and other species at Seale-Hayne College (an agricultural college near Newton Abbot). From 1935 to 1939 he did all of his fieldwork west of Truro and mostly in the Isles of Scilly.

From 1940 to 1953 he was employed at the Rothamsted Experimental Station (now called Rothamsted Research) and worked on potato leafroll virus (PLRV) and potato virus Y (PVY). His research team established that aphids spread viral diseases of potato. During WW II he served as an air raid warden and during nights on duty he read scientific literature relevant to his research. He found a 56-page paper on dissemination of infectious diseases of plants by air currents, published by Konstantin Mikhailovich Stepanov in 1935 in Russian. Gregory thereupon learned Russian from phonograph records which he purchased with money received from selling his grandfather's gold watch. With help from his wife Margaret, he published in 1945 an important formula, which became a classic. (The formula was subsequently extended by A. C. Chamberlain.) Gregory became interested in the production of penicillin by Penicillium chrysogenum Thom (then known as P. notatum Westling) and took a one-year secondment to work at Imperial Chemical Industries, Ltd., Biological Laboratories, Manchester. In 1948 Gregory published a multiple infection transformation, which is now often used. In 1951 Gregory, in collaboration with S. Waller, introduced the genus Cryptostroma.

In 1953 Gregory resigned his position as assistant director of Rothamsted's plant pathology laboratory to become a professor in the chair of botany at Imperial College London. He conducted his research at the Chelsea Physic Garden.

In 1958 Gregory returned to Rothamsted as head of the plant pathology department. For some years he collaborated with Professor Jack Pepys, M.D. at the Institute of Diseases of the Chest (now the National Heart and Lung Institute). In 1967 Gregory retired, suffering from health problems. After a brief stay in hospital, his health improved and he became an international consultant on diseases of Theobroma cocoa.

Gregory's research on spore dispersal and disease gradients, along with the work of J. E. Van Der Plank Jr., provided the theoretical basis for much research on phytopathological epidemiology and forecasting, as well as sampling of spores and other airborne particles. Gregory was a leading expert on aerobiology related to fungal spores, but he also did important research on "dermatophytes, flowering bulbs, the spread of potato viruses, human allergy and cocoa diseases".

London University awarded Gregory the D.Sc. degree in 1949. In 1962 he was elected a Fellow of the Royal Society. He was the president of the Hertfordshire Natural History Society in 1966. Gregory gave the Royal Society's Leeuwenhoek Lecture in 1970 and the British Mycological Society's inaugural Benefactors' Lecture in 1984. He died in 1986; he was married and had a son, a daughter, and three grandchildren.

== Selected publications ==
=== Articles ===
- Gregory, P. H. (1935). "The Dermatophytes". Biological Reviews. 10 (2): 208–233. doi:10.1111/j.1469-185X.1935.tb00483.x. S2CID 221530995.
- Gregory, P.H. (1939). "The life history of Ramularia Vallisumbrosae Cav. On Narcissus". Transactions of the British Mycological Society. 23: 24–IN1. doi:10.1016/S0007-1536(39)80013-4.
- Gregory, P.H. (1945). "The dispersion of air-borne spores". Transactions of the British Mycological Society. 28 (1–2): 26–72. doi:10.1016/S0007-1536(45)80041-4.
- Gregory, P. H. (1952). "Spore Content of the Atmosphere Near the Ground". Nature. 170 (4325): 475–477. Bibcode:1952Natur.170..475G. doi:10.1038/170475a0. PMID 12993203. S2CID 35016179.
- Gregory, P. H. (1957). "Electrostatic Charges on Spores of Fungi in Air". Nature. 180 (4581): 330. Bibcode:1957Natur.180..330G. doi:10.1038/180330a0. S2CID 4222739.
- Gregory, P. H.; Hirst, J. M. (1957). "The Summer Air-Spora at Rothamsted in 1952". Journal of General Microbiology. 17 (1): 135–152. doi:10.1099/00221287-17-1-135. PMID 13475682.
- Gregory, P. H.; Guthrie, E. J.; Bunce, M. E. (1959). "Experiments on Splash Dispersal of Fungus Spores". Journal of General Microbiology. 20 (2): 328–354. doi:10.1099/00221287-20-2-328. PMID 13654728.
- Gregory, P. H. (1962). "Identity of Organized Elements from Meteorites". Nature. 194 (4833): 1065. Bibcode:1962Natur.194.1065G. doi:10.1038/1941065a0. S2CID 4219166.
- Gregory, Philip Herries (1962). Outdoor aerobiology. Washington, D.C. LCCN 63000480. 1976 edition. Oxford Biology Readers, issue 62. London: Oxford University Press. 1976. ISBN 0199141827. LCCN 76381264. (pamphlet, 16 pages, illustrated)
- Pepys, J.; Jenkins, P.A.; Festenstein, G.N.; Gregory, P.H.; Lacey, M.E.; Skinner, F.A. (1963). "Farmer's lung. Thermophilic actinomycetes as a source of "farmer's lung hay" antigen". Lancet. 2 (7308): 607–611. doi:10.1016/s0140-6736(63)90398-2. PMID 14054440.
- Gregory, P. H.; Lacey, M. E. (1963). "Mycological Examination of Dust from Mouldy Hay Associated with Farmer's Lung Disease". Journal of General Microbiology. 30: 75–88. doi:10.1099/00221287-30-1-75. PMID 13950271. S2CID 35725510.
- Gregory, P. H. (1968). "Interpreting Plant Disease Dispersal Gradients". Annual Review of Phytopathology. 6 (1): 189–212. Bibcode:1968AnRvP...6..189G. doi:10.1146/annurev.py.06.090168.001201.
- Frankland, A. W.; Gregory, P. H. (1973). "Allergenic and Agricultural Implications of Airborne Ascospore Concentrations from a Fungus, Didymella exitialis". Nature. 245 (5424): 336–337. Bibcode:1973Natur.245..336F. doi:10.1038/245336a0. PMID 4586444. S2CID 4218493.
- Fitt, B. D. L.; Gregory†, P. H.; Todd, A. D.; McCartney, H. A.; MacDonald, O. C. (1987). "Spore Dispersal and Plant Disease Gradients; a Comparison between two Empirical Models". Journal of Phytopathology. 118 (3): 227–242. Bibcode:1987JPhyt.118..227F. doi:10.1111/j.1439-0434.1987.tb00452.x.

=== Books ===
- Gregory, P. H. (1961). Microbiology of the atmosphere. L. Hill in London; Interscience Publishers in New York. LCCN 62005137; xi+251 pages 2nd edition. New York: Wiley. 1973. ISBN 0471326712. LCCN 72007718.
- Gregory, P. H.; Monteith, J. L., eds. (1967). Airborne microbes: seventeenth symposium of the Society for General Microbiology held at the Imperial College, London, April 1967. London: Cambridge United Press for the Society for General Microbiology. LCCN 67083406; xii+385 pages
- Gregory, P. H., ed. (1974). Phytophthora disease of cocoa. London: Longman. ISBN 058246658X. LCCN 73085686; xii+348 pages
- Gregory, P. H.; Maddison, A. C., eds. (1981). Epidemiology of Phytophora on Cocoa in Nigeria: Final Report of the International Cocoa Black Pod Research Project (PDF). Kew, Surrey, England: Commonwealth Mycological Institute. ISBN 0-85198-478-9.
