= METER Group =

- Industry: Research, Development, Manufacturing
- Founded: 1983
- Founder: Dr. Gaylon S. Campbell
- Successor: METER Group
- Headquarters: Pullman, WA, United States
- Key people: Colin Campbell, President
- Products: Scientific instruments for food and environmental sciences.
- Website: METER Group

Former logo of Decagon Devices

METER Group, Inc., formerly Decagon Devices, is an American corporation that designs and markets scientific instruments, sensors, and data loggers for use in both agricultural and food science applications. Decagon was founded in 1983 by Dr. Gaylon Campbell.

In 2008, Decagon Devices was selected by The Wall Street Journal as one of the "Top Small Workplaces."

In 2016, Decagon Devices merged with the German scientific engineering company UMS AG to form METER Group, Inc.

In 2022, METER Group market group 'Environment' was purchased by Campbell Scientific. Market Group 'Food' and 'Horticulture' known as 'AROYA' split and became ADDIUM.
