= Photosynthetic capacity =

Biological measurement unit

Photosynthetic capacity (A_{max}) is a measure of the maximum rate at which leaves are able to fix carbon during photosynthesis. It is typically measured as the amount of carbon dioxide that is fixed per metre squared per second, for example as μmol m^{−2} sec^{−1}.

== Limitations ==
Photosynthetic capacity is limited by carboxylation capacity and electron transport capacity. For example, in high carbon dioxide concentrations or in low light, the plant is not able to regenerate ribulose-1,5-bisphosphate fast enough (also known RUBP, the acceptor molecule in photosynthetic carbon reduction). So in this case, photosynthetic capacity is limited by electron transport of the light reaction, which generates the NADPH and ATP required for the PCR (Calvin) Cycle, and regeneration of RUBP. On the other hand, in low carbon dioxide concentrations, the capacity of the plant to perform carboxylation (adding carbon dioxide to Rubisco) is limited by the amount of available carbon dioxide, with plenty of Rubisco left over.¹ Light response, or photosynthesis-irradiance, curves display these relationships.

== Current Research ==
Recent studies have shown that photosynthetic capacity in leaves can be increased with an increase in the number of stomata per leaf. This could be important in further crop development engineering to increase the photosynthetic efficiency through increasing diffusion of carbon dioxide into the plant.²
