= Evergreen =

Plant that has leaves in all seasons

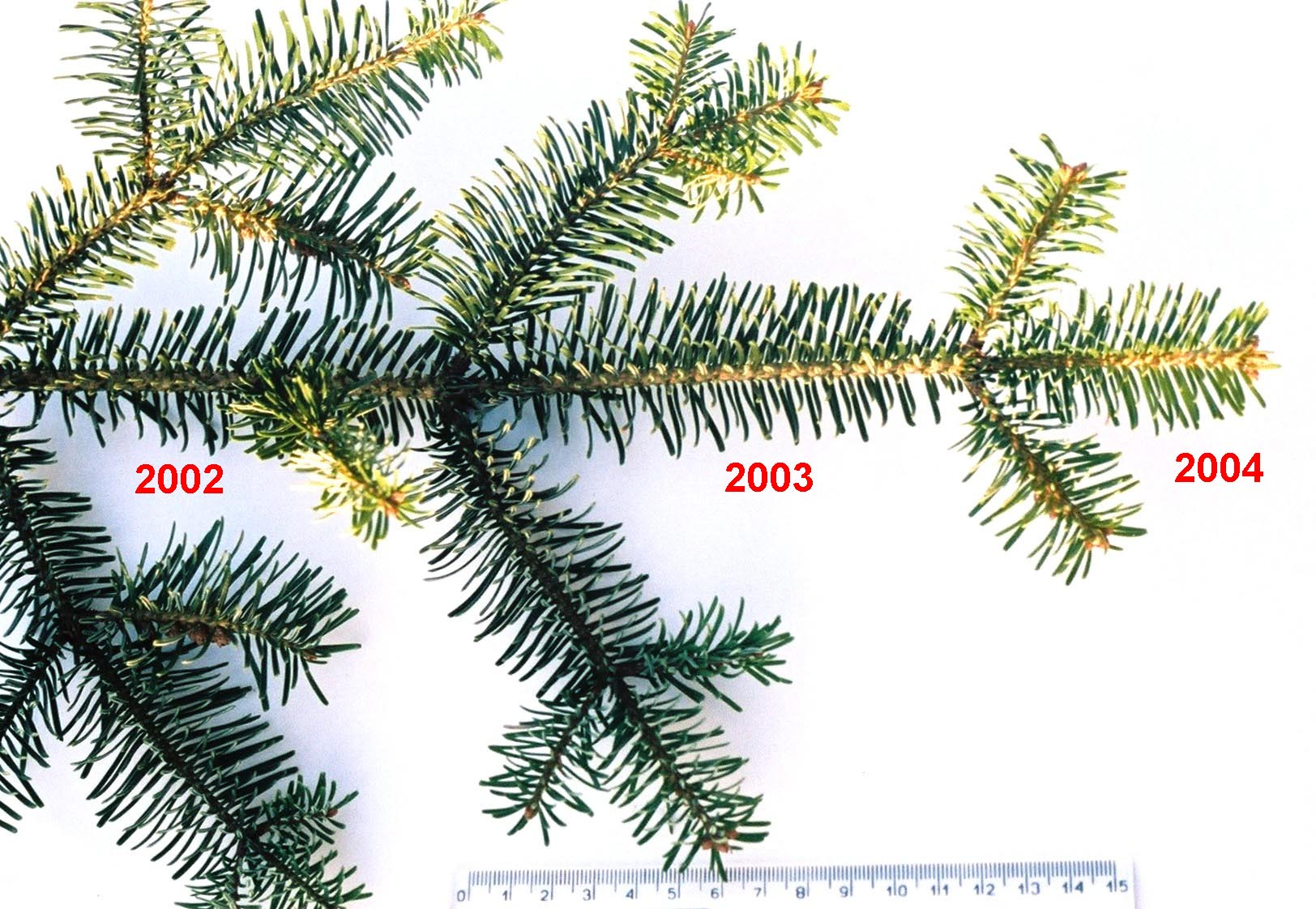
A silver fir shoot showing three successive years of retained leaves

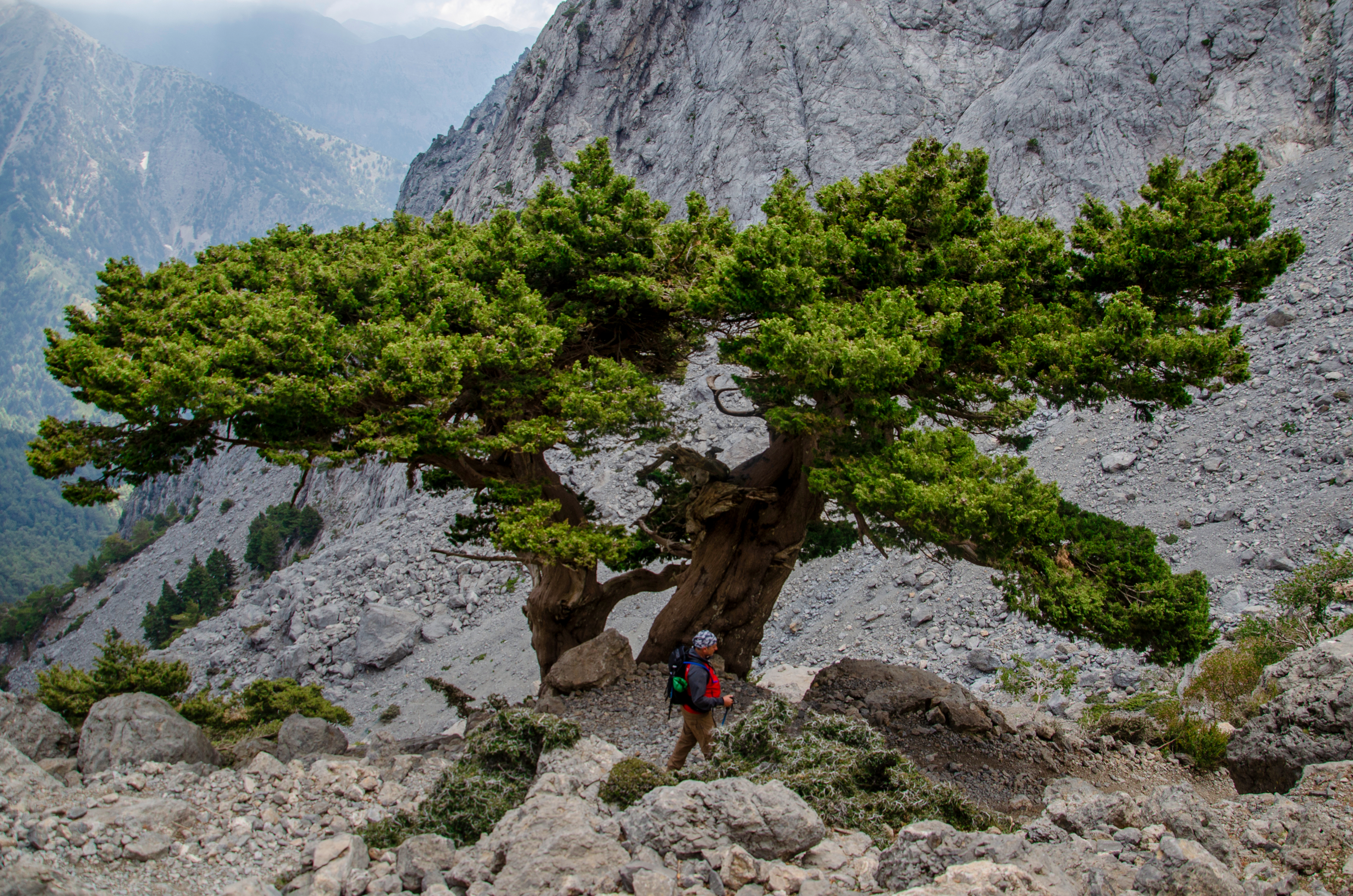
Cupressus sempervirens (Mediterranean cypress), an evergreen tree

In botany, an evergreen is a plant which has foliage that remains green and functional throughout the year. This contrasts with deciduous plants, which lose their foliage completely during the winter or dry season. Consisting of many different species, the unique feature of evergreen plants lends itself to various environments and purposes.

== Evergreen species ==
There are many different kinds of evergreen plants, including trees, shrubs, and vines. Evergreens include:

- Most species of conifers (e.g., pine, hemlock, spruce, and fir), but not all (e.g., larch).
- Live oak, holly, and "ancient" gymnosperms such as cycads
- Many woody plants from frost-free climates
- Most rainforest trees
- All eucalypts
- All palms
- Most bamboos
- Clubmosses and relatives

The Latin binomial term sempervirens, meaning "always green", refers to the evergreen nature of the plant, for instance:

Cupressus sempervirens (a cypress)
Lonicera sempervirens (a honeysuckle)
Sequoia sempervirens (a sequoia)

The longevity of individual leaves in evergreen plants varies from a few months to several decades, up to a maximum of 45 years in the Great Basin bristlecone pine Pinus longaeva.

=== Prominent families including evergreen species ===
| Family name | Example |
|---|---|
| Cyatheaceae | Australian tree fern |
| Cycadaceae | Queen sago |
| Araucariaceae | Kauri |
| Podocarpaceae | Real yellowwood |
| Taxaceae | Yew |
| Cupressaceae | Sequoia |
| Pinaceae | Pine |
| Aquifoliaceae | Holly |
| Fagaceae | Live oak |
| Rosaceae | Loquat |
| Fabaceae | Wattle |
| Rutaceae | Citrus |
| Apocynaceae | Oleander |
| Ericaceae | Rhododendron |
| Oleaceae | Olive |
| Myrtaceae | Eucalyptus |
| Arecaceae | Coconut |
| Lauraceae | Bay |
| Magnoliaceae | Southern magnolia |

== Differences between evergreen and deciduous species ==
Evergreen and deciduous species vary in a range of morphological and physiological characters. Generally, broad-leaved evergreen species have thicker leaves than deciduous species, with a larger volume of parenchyma and air spaces per unit leaf area. They have larger leaf biomass per unit leaf area, and hence a lower specific leaf area. Construction costs do not differ between the groups. Evergreens have generally a larger fraction of total plant biomass present as leaves (LMF), but they often have a lower rate of photosynthesis.

== Reasons for being evergreen or deciduous ==
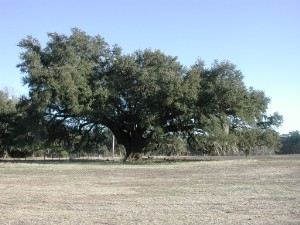
A southern live oak in South Carolina during winter

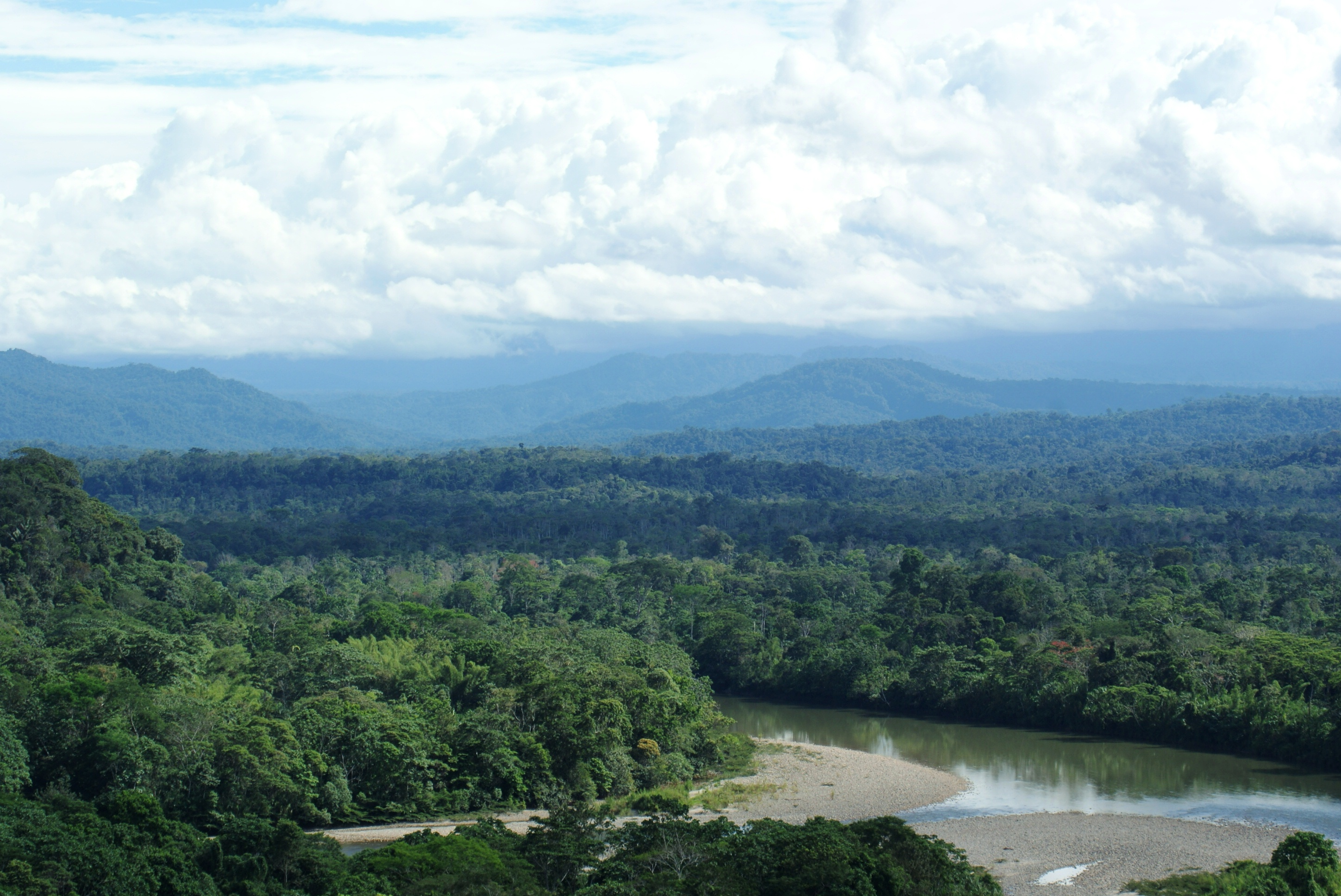
Ecuadorian Amazon rainforest. This humid tropical forest has warm temperatures and receives rainfall year round. Vegetation consists of a majority of broadleaf evergreen species.

Deciduous trees shed their leaves usually as an adaptation to a cold or dry/wet season. Evergreen trees also lose leaves, but each tree loses its leaves gradually and not all at once. Most tropical rainforest plants are considered to be evergreens, replacing their leaves gradually throughout the year as the leaves age and fall, whereas species growing in seasonally arid climates may be either evergreen or deciduous. Most warm temperate climate plants are also evergreen. In cool temperate climates, fewer plants are evergreen. In such climates, there is a predominance of conifers because few evergreen broadleaf plants can tolerate severe cold below about −26 °C (−15 °F). In addition, evergreen foliage experiences significant leaf damage in these cold, dry climates. Root systems are the most vulnerable aspect of many plants. Even though roots are insulated by soil, which tends to be warmer than average air temperatures, soil temperatures that drop too low can kill the plant. The exact temperature which evergreen roots can handle depends on the species, for example, Picea glauca (White Spruce) roots are killed at −10 °F (−23 °C).

In areas where there is a reason for being deciduous, e.g. a cold season or dry season, evergreen plants are usually an adaptation of low nutrient levels. Additionally, they usually have hard leaves and have an excellent water economy due to scarce resources in the area in which they reside. The excellent water economy within the evergreen species is due to high abundance when compared to deciduous species, whereas deciduous trees lose nutrients whenever they lose their leaves. In warmer areas, species such as some pines and cypresses grow on poor soils and disturbed ground. In Rhododendron, a genus with many broadleaf evergreens, species were recorded on acidic soils in a temperate Himalayan forest, with soil pH and associated nutrient availability influencing their growth patterns. In taiga or boreal forests, it is too cold for the organic matter in the soil to decay rapidly, so the nutrients in the soil are less easily available to plants, thus favoring evergreens.

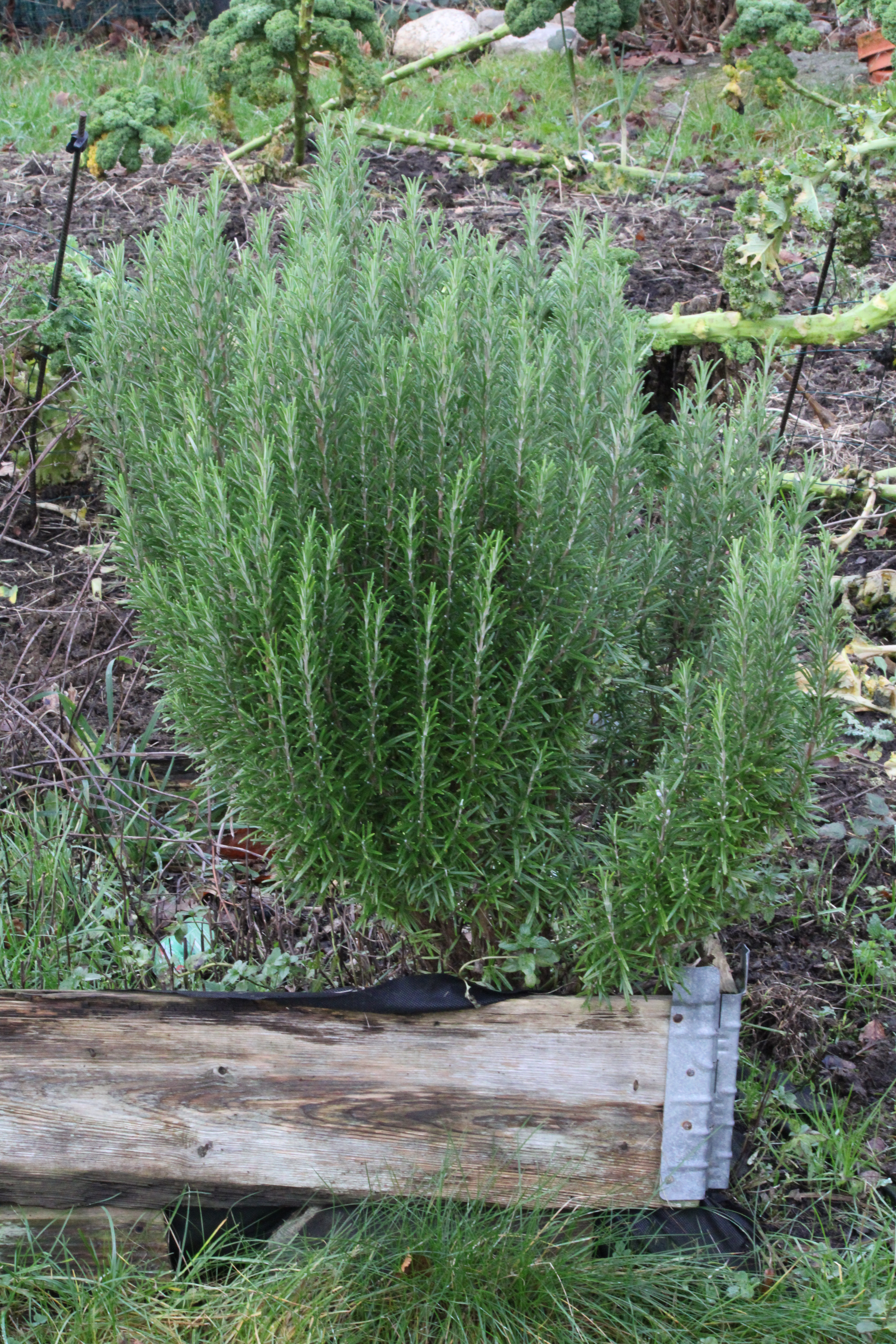
A rosemary plant during winter near Frederikshavn, Denmark

In temperate climates, evergreens can reinforce their own survival; evergreen leaf and needle litter has a higher carbon–nitrogen ratio than deciduous leaf litter, contributing to a higher soil acidity and lower soil nitrogen content. This is the case with Mediterranean evergreen seedlings, which have unique C and N storages that allow stored resources to determine fast growth within the species, limiting competition and bolstering survival. These conditions favor the growth of more evergreens and make it more difficult for deciduous plants to persist. In addition, the shelter provided by existing evergreen plants can make it easier for younger evergreen plants to survive cold and/or drought.

== Uses ==
Evergreen plants can have decorative as well as functional uses. In months where most other plants are dormant, evergreens with their sturdy structure, and vibrant foliage are popular choices to beautify a landscape. Additionally, evergreens can serve as a windbreak, stopping heat loss from buildings during cold months when placed on the (latitude/hemisphere specific) side of a structure. e.g. the northwest in Virginia, USA.

=== Cultural uses ===
Evergreens have long held cultural significance across many societies; they are commonly used as symbols of life, endurance, and renewal, because they remain green through winter.

=== Nutritional and medicinal uses ===
Conifer needle teas have been widely used as a source of vitamin C, helping to prevent or treat scurvy, and as remedies for colds, coughs, and fatigue. Many evergreen teas were valued for antimicrobial, anti-inflammatory, or expectorant properties, attributed to terpenes and phenols found in needles and leaves.

=== Culinary uses ===
Today, evergreen teas are sometimes consumed for their distinct resinous, forest-like, and citrus-resin notes, and are used in craft beers and craft sodas, herbal infusions, and foraging-based cuisine.

== See also ==
- Semi-deciduous (semi-evergreen)
