= Relative growth rate =

Growth rate relative to size

Relative growth rate (RGR) is growth rate relative to size - that is, a rate of growth per unit time, as a proportion of its size at that moment in time. It is also called the exponential growth rate, or the continuous growth rate.

== Rationale ==
RGR is a concept relevant in cases where the increase in a state variable over time is proportional to the value of that state variable at the beginning of a time period. In terms of differential equations, if $S$ is the current size, and $\frac{dS}{dt}$ its growth rate, then relative growth rate is
$$RGR=\frac{1}{S}\frac{dS}{dt}.$$
If the RGR is constant, i.e.,
$$\frac{1}{S}\frac{dS}{dt} = k,$$
a solution to this equation is
$$S(t) = S_0\exp(k\cdot t)$$
where:

- S(t) is the final size at time (t).
- S_{0} is the initial size.
- k is the relative growth rate.

A closely related concept is doubling time.

== Calculations ==
In the simplest case of observations at two time points, RGR is calculated using the following equation:
$$RGR \ = \ {\operatorname{\ln(S_2) \ - \ \ln(S_1)}\over\operatorname{t_2 \ - \ t_1}\!},$$
where:

- $\ln$ = natural logarithm
- $t_1$ = time one (e.g. in days)
- $t_2$ = time two (e.g. in days)
- $S_1$ = size at time one
- $S_2$ = size at time two

When calculating or discussing relative growth rate, it is important to pay attention to the units of time being considered.

For example, if an initial population of S_{0} bacteria doubles every twenty minutes, then at time interval $t$ it is given by solving the equation:
$$S(t) \ = \ S_0\exp(\ln(2)\cdot t) = S_0 2^t$$
where $t$ is the number of twenty-minute intervals that have passed. However, we usually prefer to measure time in hours or minutes, and it is not difficult to change the units of time. For example, since 1 hour is 3 twenty-minute intervals, the population in one hour is $S(3)=S_0 2^3$. The hourly growth factor is 8, which means that for every 1 at the beginning of the hour, there are 8 by the end. Indeed,
$$S(t) \ = \ S_0\exp(\ln(8)\cdot t) = S_0 8^t$$
where $t$ is measured in hours, and the relative growth rate may be expressed as $\ln(2)$ or approximately 69% per twenty minutes, and as $\ln(8)$ or approximately 208% per hour.

== RGR of plants ==
In plant physiology, RGR is widely used to quantify the speed of plant growth. It is part of a set of equations and conceptual models that are commonly referred to as Plant growth analysis, and is further discussed in that section.

== See also ==
- Doubling time
- Plant growth analysis
