= Hemispherical photography =

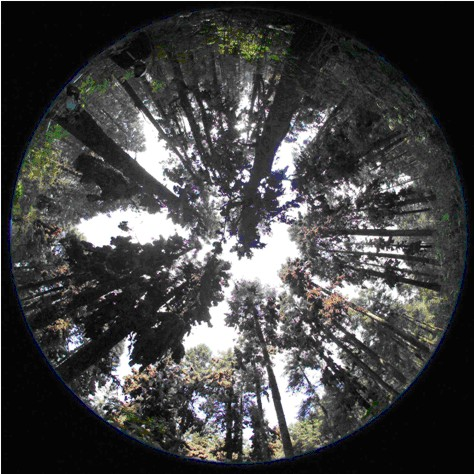
Hemispherical photograph used to study microclimate of winter roosting habitat at the Monarch Butterfly Biosphere Reserve, Mexico.

Hemispherical photography, also known as canopy photography, is a technique to estimate solar radiation and characterize plant canopy geometry using photographs taken looking upward through an extreme wide-angle lens or a fisheye lens (Rich 1990). Typically, the viewing angle approaches or equals 180-degrees, such that all sky directions are simultaneously visible. The resulting photographs record the geometry of visible sky, or conversely the geometry of sky obstruction by plant canopies or other near-ground features. This geometry can be measured precisely and used to calculate solar radiation transmitted through (or intercepted by) plant canopies, as well as to estimate aspects of canopy structure such as leaf area index. Detailed treatments of field and analytical methodology have been provided by Paul Rich (1989, 1990) and Robert Pearcy (1989).

== History ==
The hemispherical lens (also known as a fisheye or whole-sky lens) was originally designed by Robin Hill (1924) to view the entire sky for meteorological studies of cloud formation. Foresters and ecologists conceived of using photographic techniques to study the light environment in forests by examining the canopy geometry. In particular, Evans and Coombe (1959) estimated sunlight penetration through forest canopy openings by overlaying diagrams of the sun track on hemispherical photographs. Later, Margaret Anderson (1964, 1971) provided a thorough theoretical treatment for calculating the transmission of direct and diffuse components of solar radiation through canopy openings using hemispherical photographs. At that time hemispherical photograph analysis required tedious manual scoring of overlays of sky quadrants and the track of the sun. With the advent of personal computers, researchers developed digital techniques for rapid analysis of hemispherical photographs (Chazdon and Field 1987, Rich 1988, 1989, 1990, Becker et al. 1989). In recent years, researchers have started using digital cameras in favor of film cameras, and algorithms are being developed for automated image classification and analysis. Various commercial software programs have become available for hemispherical photograph analysis, and the technique has been applied for diverse uses in ecology, meteorology, forestry, and agriculture.

== Applications ==
Hemispherical photography has been used successfully in a broad range of applications involving microsite characterization and estimation of the solar radiation near the ground and beneath plant canopies. For example, hemispherical photography has been used to characterize winter roosting sites for monarch butterflies (Weiss et al. 1991), effects of forest edges (Galo et al. 1991), influence of forest treefall gaps on tree regeneration (Rich et al. 1993), spatial and temporal variability of light in tropical rainforest understory (Clark et al. 1996), impacts of hurricanes on forest ecology (Bellingham et al. 1996), leaf area index for validation of remote sensing (Chen et al. 1997), canopy architecture of boreal forests (Fournier et al. 1997), light environment in old growth temperate rain forests (Weiss 2000), and management of vineyard trellises to make better wine (Weiss et al. 2003).

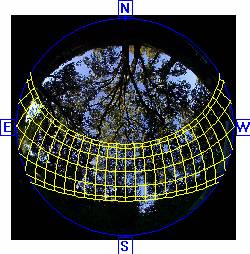
Hemispherical photograph with sunpath overlay from a closed canopy reach of San Francisquito Creek, San Francisco Peninsula, California, used for studies of steelhead trout habitat.

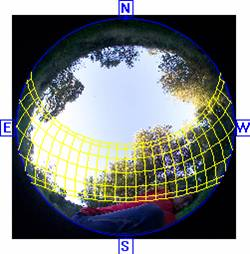
Hemispherical photograph from an open canopy reach of San Francisquito Creek. Overlay of the sunpath enables calculation of solar exposure as it influences water temperature.

== Theory ==
=== Solar Radiation Calculations ===
Direct and diffuse components of solar radiation are calculated separately (see Earth's radiation balance). Direct radiation is calculated as the sum of all direct (solar beam) radiation originating from visible (non-obscured) sky directions along the path of the sun. Similarly, diffuse solar radiation is calculated as the sum of all diffuse radiation (scattered from the atmosphere) originating from any visible (non-obscured) sky directions (see diffuse sky radiation). The sum of direct and diffuse components gives global radiation.

These calculations require theoretical or empirical distributions of direct and diffuse radiation in the open, without canopy or other sky obstruction. Usually calculations are performed for either photosynthetically active radiation (400-700 nanometers) or insolation integrated over all wavelengths, measured in kilowatt-hours per square meter (kW h/m^{2}).

The fundamental assumption is that most solar radiation originates from visible (unobscured) sky directions, a strong first order effect, and that reflected radiation from the canopy or other near-ground features (non-visible or obscured sky directions) is negligible, a small second order effect. Another assumption is that the geometry of visible (non-obscured) sky does not change over the period for which calculations are performed.

=== Canopy Calculations ===
Canopy indices, such as leaf area index (LAI), are based on calculation of gap fraction, the proportion of visible (non-obscured) sky as a function of sky direction. Leaf area index is typically calculated as the leaf area per unit ground area that would produce the observed gap fraction distribution, given an assumption of random leaf angle distribution, or a known leaf angle distribution and degree of clumping. The calculation of the LAI using this indirect method can be very imprecise. For further explanation see leaf area index.

== Indices ==
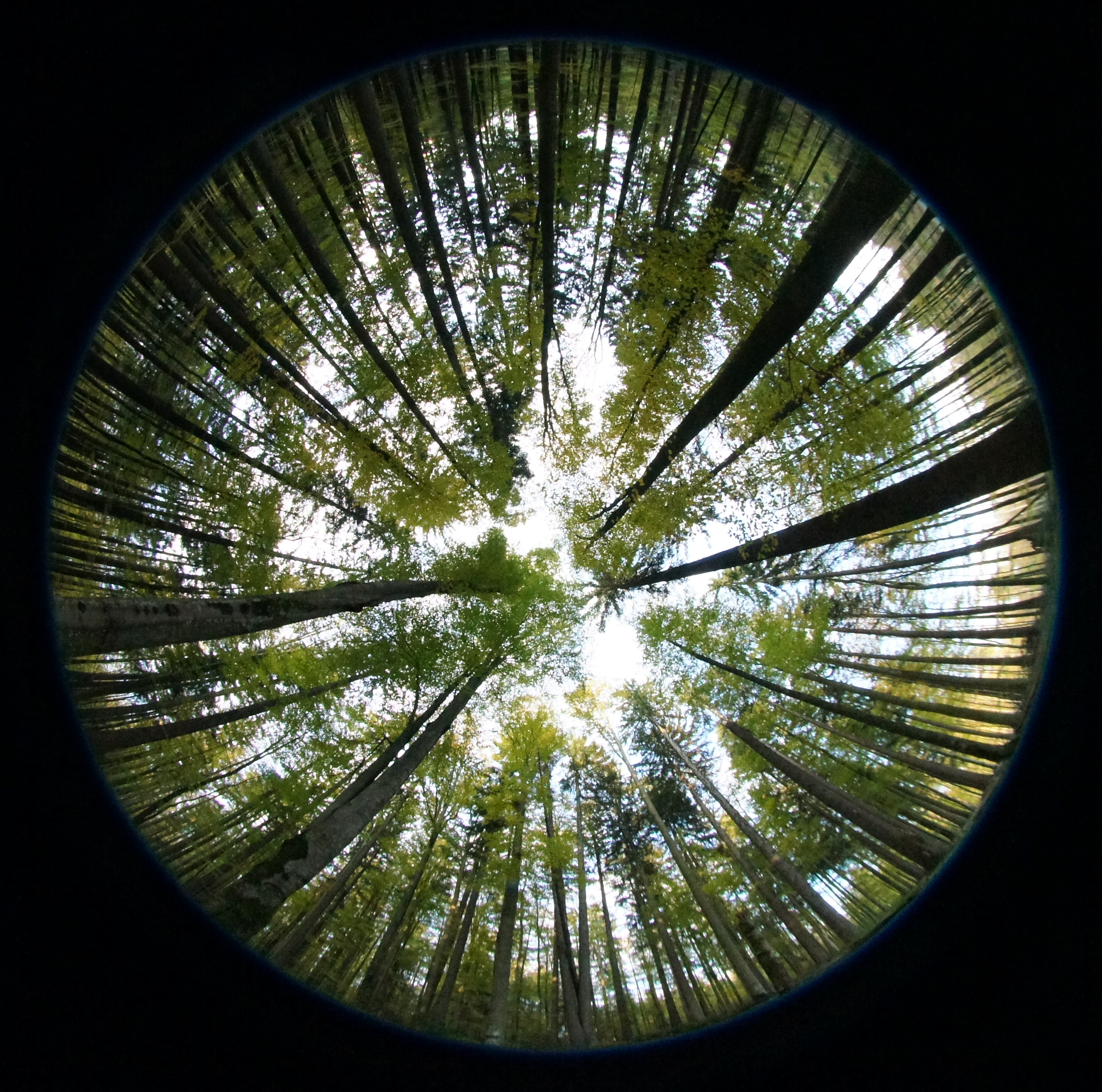
Hemispherical photograph used to study LAI, canopy closure, or other canopy indices.

Direct Site Factor (DSF) is the proportion of direct solar radiation at a given location relative to that in the open, either integrated over time or resolved according to intervals of time of day and/or season.

Indirect Site Factor (ISF) is the proportion of diffuse solar radiation at a given location relative to that in the open, either integrated over time for all sky directions or resolved by sky sector direction.

Global Site Factor (GSF) is the proportion of global solar radiation at a given location relative to that in the open, calculated as the sum of DSF and ISF weighted by the relative contribution of direct versus diffuse components. Sometimes this index is also called Total Side Factor (TSF).

Indices may be uncorrected or corrected for angle of incidence relative to a flat intercepting surface. Uncorrected values weight solar radiation originating from all directions equally. Corrected values weight solar radiation by the cosine of the angle of incidence, accounting for actual interception from directions normal to the intercepting surface.

Leaf Area Index is the total leaf surface area per unit ground area.

Gap Fraction (GapF) is the amount in percent of canopy in relation to the whole measuring zone.

== Methodology ==
Hemispherical photography entails five steps: photograph acquisition, digitization, registration, classification, and calculation. Registration, classification, and calculation are accomplished using dedicated hemispherical photography analysis software.

=== Photograph acquisition ===
Upward-looking hemispherical photographs are typically acquired under uniform sky lighting, early or late in the day or under overcast conditions. Known orientation (zenith and azimuth) is essential for proper registration with the analysis hemispherical coordinate system. Even lighting is essential for accurate image classification. A self-leveling mount (gimbals) can facilitate acquisition by ensuring that the camera is oriented to point straight up toward the zenith. The camera is typically oriented such that north (absolute or magnetic) is oriented toward the top of the photograph.

The lens used in hemispherical photography is generally a circular fisheye, such as the Nikkor 8mm fisheye lens. Full-frame fisheye are not suitable for hemispherical photography, as they only capture a full 180° across the diagonal, and do not provide a complete hemispherical view.

In the early years of the technique, most hemispherical photographs were acquired with 35 mm cameras (e.g., Nikon FM2 with a Nikkor 8mm fisheye lens) using high contrast, high ASA black-and-white film. Later, use of color film or slides became common. Recently most photographs are acquired using digital cameras (e.g., Kodak DCS Pro 14nx with a Nikkor 8mm fisheye lens).

When images are acquired from locations with large differences in openness (for example, closed canopy locations and canopy gaps) it is essential to control camera exposure. If the camera is allowed to automatically adjust exposure (which is controlled by aperture and shutter speed), the result is that small openings in closed conditions will be bright, whereas openings of the same size in open conditions will be darker (for example, canopy areas around a gap). This means that during image analysis the same-sized holes will be interpreted as "sky" in a closed-canopy image and "canopy" in the open-canopy image. Without controlling exposure, the real differences between closed- and open-canopy conditions will be underestimated.

=== Digitization ===
Photographs are digitized and saved in standard image formats. For film cameras this step requires a negative or slide scanner or a video digitizer. For digital cameras this step occurs as photographs are acquired.

=== Registration ===
Photograph registration involves aligning the photographs with the hemispherical coordinate system used for analysis, in terms of translation (centering), size (coincidence of photograph edges and horizon in coordinate system), and rotation (azimuthal alignment with respect to compass directions).

=== Classification ===
Photograph classification involves determining which image pixels represent visible (non-obscured) versus non-visible (obscured) sky directions. Typically this has been accomplished using interactive thresholding, whereby an appropriate threshold is selected to best match a binary classification with observed sky visibility, with pixel intensity values above the threshold classified as visible and pixel intensity values below the threshold classified as non-visible. Recently advances have been made in developing automatic threshold algorithms, however more work is still needed before these are fully reliable.

=== Calculation ===
Hemispherical photograph calculation uses algorithms that compute gap fraction as function of sky direction, and compute desired canopy geometry and/or solar radiation indices. For solar radiation, rapid calculation is often accomplished using pre-calculated lookup tables of theoretical or empirical solar radiation values resolved by sky sector or position in the sunpath.

== See also ==
- Leaf area index
- Panoramic photography
- View factor
- Whole sky camera
