= Michael Francis Madelin =

British mycologist

- Born: 1931; London, England
- Died: 2007 (aged 75–76); Oxford, England
- Education: Imperial College London
- Known for: Pioneer work in slime moulds and conidial fungi
- Awards: Forbes Memorial Medal and Prize in Biology (1951); Huxley Memorial Medal and Prize (1967)
- Scientific career
- Fields: Mycology
- Workplaces: Imperial College London; University of London; University of Bristol
- Thesis: Factors influencing growth and fruiting of Coprinus lagopus Fr. (1954)
- Doctoral advisor: Ronald Karslake Starr Wood
- Doctoral students: George C. Clerk

Michael Francis Madelin (1931–2007) was a British mycologist. He held research faculty positions at Imperial College, University of London, and the University of Bristol, and undertook pioneering research in conidial fungi and slime moulds, with specific reference to their physiology and ecology.

== Early life and education ==
Madelin was raised in London and was a pupil at the Slough Grammar School and Latymer Upper School. In 1947, he took a gap year after secondary school to work at the Commonwealth Mycological Institute in Kew. His undergraduate studies was at Imperial College London, graduating with first class honours in botany at the age of 20 and won the Forbes Memorial Medal and Prize in Biology. M. F. Madelin continued his graduate studies at the same institution under the supervision of the pioneer British plant pathologist, R. K. S. Wood, and earned his PhD in mycology in 1954. Between 1955 and 1957, Michael Madelin did his national service as a flight lieutenant in the Royal Air Force.

== Career ==
He became a lecturer at the University College of the Gold Coast, then part of the University of London external system, where he researched tropical fungal parasites in insects and developed a lifelong interest in the subject. Moving back to Imperial College, he taught courses in plant pathology before accepting a mycology research-lectureship at the University of Bristol in 1962. For his groundbreaking research conducted at Imperial College, he received the Huxley Memorial Medal and Prize in 1967. He taught a popular course, Medicine and Mycology, to medical students at Cambridge. He also carried out various academic assignments at the universities of Bath, Hull and Exeter.

Madelin was a visiting researcher at several institutions abroad in Chennai, India; Suva, Fiji and Madrid, Spain. He was the co-convener of the First International Fungus Spore Symposium which took place in Bristol in 1965. He was influential in other international meetings in mycology, particularly those held in Kananaskis, Alberta; Gwatt, Switzerland; Exeter, UK and Berkeley, California. He served in various capacities at the British Mycological Society as the Programme Secretary, Vice-President, and President. M. F. Madelin co-edited the Journal of General Microbiology, now named Microbiology, for six years in the early 1970s.

He was the doctoral advisor of the pioneering Ghanaian plant pathologist, George C. Clerk (1931–2019). He also collaborated with the Indian botanist, C. V. Subramanian.

He retired from Bristol in 1991 and relocated to Oxford. He then devoted himself to popular science, teaching fungi at the university and through broadcast journalism on television and radio.

== Personal life ==
He was married to Therese and they had five children.

== Final years and death ==
Later in life, M. F. Madelin was diagnosed with Lewy body dementia and Parkinson's disease. He died in Oxford in 2007, aged 76. His remains were buried at the Wolvercote Cemetery.

== Bibliography ==
=== Further reading ===
==== Works ====
The following are scientific publications of Michael Francis Madelin:

- M. F. Madelin, "Studies on the nutrition of Coprinus lagopus Fr., especially as affecting fruiting" Annals of Botany, New Series, 20 (1956), pp. 307–330
- M. F. Madelin, "The influence of light and temperature on the fruiting of Coprinus lagopus Fr. in pure culture" Annals of Botany, New Series, 20 (1956), pp. 467–480
- M. F. Madelin, "Visible changes in the vegetative mycelium of Coprinus lagopus Fr. at the time of fruiting" Transactions of the British Mycological Society, 43 (1960), pp. 105–110
- M. F. Madelin, "Internal fungal parasites of insects" Endeavour, 19 (1960), pp. 181–190
- M. F. Madelin, "Diseases caused by hyphomycetous fungi" E.A. Steinhouse (Ed.), Insect Pathology (1963), pp. 233–271
- M. F. Madelin, "Laboratory studies on the infection of Anopheles gambiae Giles by a species of Coelomomyces" World Health Organisation (1964) WHO/EBL/17. pp. 23
- M. F. Madelin, "Further laboratory studies on a species of Coelomomyces which infects Anopheles gambiae" Giles World Health Organisation (1965) WHO/EBL/52. pp. 22
- M. F. Madelin, "Insect parasitism" K.B. Raper, D.I. Fennell (Eds.), The Genus Aspergillus (1965), pp. 101–102
- G. C. Clerk, M. F. Madelin "The longevity of conidia of three insect-parasitizing hyphomycetes" Transactions of the British Mycological Society, 48 (1965), pp. 193–209
- M. F. Madelin "Fungal parasites of insects" Annual Review of Entomology, 11 (1966), pp. 423–488
- M. F. Madelin "Trichothecium acridiorum (Trabut) comb. nov. on red locusts" Transactions of the British Mycological Society, 48 (1966), pp. 193–209
- M. F. Madelin "The genesis of spores of higher fungi" M.F. Madelin (Ed.), The Fungus Spore, Proceedings of the 18th Symposium of the Colston Society [Colston Papers No. 18], Butterworths, London (1966), pp. 15–36
- M. F. Madelin (Ed.), "The Fungus Spore," Proceedings of the 18th Symposium of the Colston Society [Colston Papers No. 18], Butterworths, London (1966)
- M. F. Madelin, R. K. Robinson, R. J. Williams "Appressorium-like structures in insect-parasitizing deuteromycetes" Journal of Invertebrate Pathology, 9 (1967), pp. 404–412
- M. F. Madelin, "Fungal parasites of invertebrates. 1. Entomogenous fungi" G.C. Ainsworth, A.S. Sussman (Eds.), The Fungi: an advanced treatise, The Fungal Population, vol. 3, Academic Press, New York (1968), pp. 227–238
- M. F. Madelin, "Fungi parasitic on other fungi and lichens" G.C. Ainsworth, A.S. Sussman (Eds.), The Fungi: an Advanced Treatise, The Fungal Population, vol. 3, Academic Press, New York (1968), pp. 253–269
- M. Basith, M. F. Madelin, "Studies on the production of perithecial stromata by Cordyceps militaris in artificial culture" Canadian Journal of Botany, 46 (1968), pp. 473–480
- M. F. Madelin, "Studies on the infection by Coelomomyces indicus of Anopheles gambiae" Journal of the Elisha Mitchell Scientific Society, 84 (1968), pp. 115–124
- A. S. Yadav, M. F. Madelin, "The ecology of microfungi on decaying stems of Urtica dioica" Transactions of the British Mycological Society, 51 (1968), pp. 249–259
- A. S. Yadav, M. F. Madelin "Experimental studies on microfungi from decaying stems of Heracleum sphondylium and Urtica dioica" Transactions of the British Mycological Society, 51 (1968), pp. 261–267
- R. Campbell, R. W. Larner, M. F. Madelin "Notes on an albino mutant of Alternaria brassicicola" Mycologia, 60 (1968), pp. 1122–1125
- M. F. Madelin "Conidium production by higher fungi within thin layers of liquid paraffin: a slide culture technique" Journal of General Microbiology, 55 (1969), pp. 319–324
- M. F. Madelin, 1970. "Spores IV" Edited by Campbell LL [Book Review]. Transactions of the British Mycological Society 54: 335.
- M. F. Madelin, "Insect viruses" L.E. Hawker, A.H. Linton (Eds.), Micro-organisms: form, function and environment, Arnold, London (1971), pp. 251–256
- M. F. Madelin, "Actinomycetales" L.E. Hawker, A.H. Linton (Eds.), Micro-organisms: form, function and environment, Arnold, London (1971), pp. 325–336
- M. F. Madelin, "The slime moulds" L.E. Hawker, A.H. Linton (Eds.), Micro-organisms: form, function and environment, Arnold, London (1971), pp. 421–431
- M. F. Madelin, "Microbiology of air" L.E. Hawker, A.H. Linton (Eds.), Micro-organisms: form, function and environment, Arnold, London (1971), pp. 529–534
- M. F. Madelin "Micro-organisms and invertebrate animals" L.E. Hawker, A.H. Linton (Eds.), Micro-organisms: form, function and environment, Arnold, London (1971), pp. 597–610
- M. F. Madelin, A. Beckett "The production of planonts by thin-walled sporangia of the fungus Coelomomyces indicus, a parasite of mosquitoes" Journal of General Microbiology, 72 (1972), pp. 185–200
- M. F. Madelin, "Actinomycetales: characteristics and practical importance" G. Sykes, F.A. Skinner (Eds.), British Book News (July 1973) [Book Review]
- A. E. Uduedo, M. F. Madelin, "Germination of conidia of Botryodiplodia theobromae in relation to age and environment" Transactions of the British Mycological Society, 63 (1974), pp. 33–44
- A. E. Uduedo, M. F. Madelin "Maturation in vitro of conidia of Botryodiplodia theobromae" Transactions of the British Mycological Society, 63 (1974), pp. 45–56
- M. F. Madelin, S. Dorabjee "Conidium ontogeny in Wallemia sebi" Transactions of the British Mycological Society, 63 (1974), pp. 121–130
- M. F. Madelin, F. Audus, D. Knowles "Attraction of plasmodia of the Myxomycete Badhamia utricularis by extracts of the Basidiomycete Stereum hirsutum" Journal of General Microbiology, 89 (1974), pp. 229–234
- D. Knowles, M. F. Madelin, "Chemotactic and other responses of plasmodia of Badhamia utricularis to an extract of Stereum hirsutum" Journal of General Microbiology, 89 (1975), pp. 235–244
- L.E. Hawker, M. F. Madelin "The dormant spore" D.J. Weber, W.M. Hess (Eds.), The Fungal Spore: Form and Function, John Wiley, New York (1976), pp. 1–72
- M. F. Madelin, "Disease in a minor chord." Edited by Steinhaus EA [Book Review]. Transactions of the British Mycological Society 67(1976): 184
- M. F. Madelin, O. C. Ogunsanya "Sensitivity of Botryodiplodia ricinicola conidia to mild chilling" Transactions of the British Mycological Society, 69 (1971), pp. 191–195
- M. F. Madelin, "Fundamentals of Mycology." Edited by Burnett JH [Book Review]. Transactions of the British Mycological Society 2nd ed, 69 (1971): 345.
- M. F. Madelin, D. K. Toomer, J. Ryan, "Spiral growth of fungal colonies" Journal of General Microbiology, 106 (1978), pp. 73–80
- M. F. Madelin, "The Germination of Fungus Spores." Edited by Gottlieb D [Book Review]. Transactions of the British Mycological Society 73 (1979): 190–191.
- M. F. Madelin "An appraisal of the taxonomic significance of some different modes of producing blastic conidia" B. Kendrick (Ed.), The Whole Fungus: the Sexual-Asexual Synthesis, National Museums of Canada, Ottawa (1979), pp. 63–79
- O. C. Ogunsanya, M. F. Madelin, "The fine structure of conidia of Botryodiplodia ricinicola with observations on the effect of chilling" Annals of Botany, 44 (1979), pp. 417–425
- M. F. Madelin, '"Patterns of Development in Conidial Fungi." Edited by Cole GT, Sanson RA [Book Review]. Nature 281 (1979): 412.
- M. F. Madelin "Growth of colonies of filamentous organisms" L.E. Hawker, A.H. Linton (Eds.), Micro-organisms: form, function and environment (2nd edn), Arnold, London (1979), pp. 90–92
- M. F. Madelin "Actinomycetes" L.E. Hawker, A.H. Linton (Eds.), Micro-organisms: form, function and environment (2nd edn), Arnold, London (1979), pp. 168–171
- M. F. Madelin, "The phylum Gymnomyxa (the slime moulds)" L.E. Hawker, A.H. Linton (Eds.), Micro-organisms: form, function and environment (2nd edn), Arnold, London (1979), pp. 209–215
- M. F. Madelin, "Microbiology of air" L.E. Hawker, A.H. Linton (Eds.), Micro-organisms: form, function and environment (2nd edn), Arnold, London (1979), pp. 258–261
- M. F. Madelin "Virus infections of invertebrates" L.E. Hawker, A.H. Linton (Eds.), Micro-organisms: form, function and environment (2nd edn), Arnold, London (1979), pp. 314–317
- M. F. Madelin "Bacterial Infections of invertebrates" L.E. Hawker, A.H. Linton (Eds.), Micro-organisms: form, function and environment (2nd edn), Arnold, London (1979), pp. 317–318
- M. F. Madelin, "Fungal infections of invertebrates" L.E. Hawker, A.H. Linton (Eds.), Micro-organisms: form, function and environment (2nd edn), Arnold, London (1979), pp. 319–320
- M. F. Madelin, "Predacious fungi" L.E. Hawker, A.H. Linton (Eds.), Micro-organisms: form, function and environment (2nd edn), Arnold, London (1979), p. 320
- M. F. Madelin "Poisonous fungi" L.E. Hawker, A.H. Linton (Eds.), Micro-organisms: form, function and environment (2nd edn), Arnold, London (1979), pp. 340–342
- M. F. Madelin, "The genus Penicillium and its teleomorphic states Eupenicillium and Talaromyces." Edited by Pitt JI [Book Review]. British Book News (October 1980). 610,
- M. F. Madelin, "Phytopathogenic Fungi: a scanning electron stereoscopic survey." Edited by Brown MF, Brotzman HG [Book Review]. Phytopathologische Zeitschrift 99 (1980): 284–285.
- M. F. Madelin, "Marine Mycology: the higher fungi." Edited by Kohlmeyer J, Kohlmeyer E [Book Review]. Transactions of the British Mycological Society 75 (1980): 351.
- M. F. Madelin, "Fungal Biotechnology". Edited by Smith JE, Berry DR, Kristiansen B [Book Review]. British Book News (January 1981) 36–37.
- M. F. Madelin, "Introduction to modern mycology." Edited by Deacon JW [Book Review]. Transactions of the British Mycological Society 77 (1981): 224.
- M. F. Madelin, "Ultrastructural morphogenesis in higher fungi: Discussant's introduction" G. Turian, H.R. Hohl (Eds.), The Fungal Spore: Morphogenetic Controls, Academic Press, London (1981), pp. 95–106
- M. F. Madelin, "The Fungal Nucleus." Edited by Gull K, Olliver SG [Book Review]. British Book News (April 1982) 233.
- M. F. Madelin, A. Feest "Dipodascus macrosporus, sp. nov. (Hemiascomycetes), associated with plasmodia of Badhamia utricularis" Transactions of the British Mycological Society, 79 (1982), pp. 331–335
- M. F. Madelin, "The Fungal Community." Edited by Wicklow DT, Carroll GC [Book Review]. The Society for General Microbiology Quarterly 10 (1983): 50
- M. F. Madelin, "Developmental Biology of Physarum." Sauer HW [Book Review]. New Phytologist 93 (1983): 639.
- M. F. Madelin, "Interactions of myxomycetes with other microorganisms and animals (Abstract)" Bulletin of the British Mycological Society, 17 (1983), p. 1
- M. F. Madelin, "Myxomycete data of ecological significance (Presidential address)" Transactions of the British Mycological Society, 83 (1984), pp. 1–19
- M. F. Madelin, "Report of the President for 1983" Bulletin of the British Mycological Society, 18 (1984), pp. 1–3
- M. F. Madelin, "Myxomycetes, microorganisms and animals: a model of diversity in animal-microbial interactions" J.M. Anderson, A. Rayner, D.W.H. Walton (Eds.), Invertebrate-Microbial Interactions, Cambridge University Press, Cambridge, UK (1984), pp. 1–33
- A. Feest, M. F. Madelin, "A method for the enumeration of myxomycetes in soils and its application to a wide range of soils" FEMS Microbiology Ecology, 31 (1985), pp. 103–109
- P.M. Murray, A. Feest, M. F. Madelin "The numbers of viable myxomycete cells in the alimentary tracts of earthworms and in earthworm casts" Botanical Journal of the Linnean Society, 91 (1985), pp. 359–366
- A. Feest, M. F. Madelin, "Numerical abundance of myxomycetes (myxogastrids) in soils in the West of England" FEMS Microbiology Ecology, 31 (1985), pp. 353–360
- A.P.O. Dede, M. F. Madelin "Microscopic location of microorganisms in toe nails of elderly chiropody patients" Microbios Letters, 35 (1987), pp. 129–135
- A. Feest, M. F. Madelin, "Seasonal population changes of myxomycetes and associated organisms in four woodland soils" FEMS Microbiology Ecology, 53 (1988), pp. 133–140
- A. Feest, M. F. Madelin, "Seasonal population changes of myxomycetes and associated organisms in five non-woodland soils, and correlations between their numbers and soil characteristics" FEMS Microbiology Ecology, 53 (1988), pp. 141–152
- N.J. Graff, M. F. Madelin, "Axenic culture of the cyst-nematode parasitising fungus Nematophthora gynophila" Journal of Invertebrate Pathology, 53 (1989), pp. 301–306
- M.F. Madelin, "Methods for studying the ecology and population dynamics of soil myxomycetes" Methods in Microbiology, 22 (1990), pp. 405–416
- D.H.A.K. Amewowor, M. F. Madelin, "Numbers of myxomycetes and associated microorganisms in the root zones of cabbage (Brassica oleracea) and broad bean (Vicia faba) in field plots" FEMS Microbiology Ecology, 86 (1991), pp. 69–82
- M. F. Madelin, Obituary: Lilian E. Hawker: 19th May 1908–5th February 1991” Mycological Research, 95 (1991), pp. 1343–1344
- M. F. Madelin "Lilian Edith Hawker. 1908–1991. (Obituary)" Mycologia, 84 (1992), pp. 154–156
- T.M. Madelin, M. F. Madelin "Biological analysis of fungi and associated moulds" C.S. Cox, C.M. Wathes (Eds.), Bioaerosols Handbook, CRC Press, Boca Raton, London and Tokyo (1995), pp. 361–386

==== Footnotes ====
- Campbell, Richard (December 2008). "Michael Francis Madelin (1931--2007): a pioneer in the biology and ecology of conidial fungi and slime molds". Mycol. Res. 112 (Pt 12). England: 1489–92. doi:10.1016/j.mycres.2008.09.005. ISSN 0953-7562. PMID 19145717.
