= Joseph Hubert Priestley =

British botanist (1883–1944)

Joseph Hubert Priestley DSO FLS
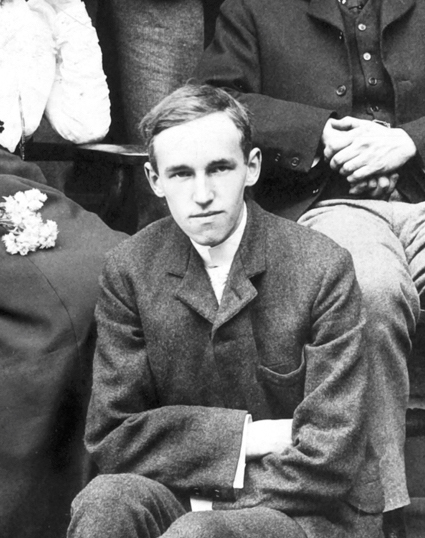
- Priestley at University College, Bristol, in 1902
- Born: Joseph Hubert Priestlay; 5 October 1883; Tewkesbury, Gloucestershire, England
- Died: 31 October 1944 (aged 61); Weetwood, Leeds, West Yorkshire, England
- Resting place: Lawnswood crematorium (ashes scattered)
- Education: University College, Bristol (1903: BSc)
- Occupations: Botanist; plant biochemist
- Relatives: Raymond Edward Priestley and Donald Lacey Priestley (brothers); Charles Seymour "Silas" Wright and Thomas Griffith "Grif" Taylor (brothers-in-law)
- Awards: 1901: Capper Pass scholarship; 1903: Exhibition of 1851
- Scientific career
- Fields: Plant morphology; Apical meristems; Plant physiology; Other fields: Secondary growth; Vegetative reproduction
- Workplaces: University College, Bristol; University of Leeds
- Notable students: Adriance Sherwood Foster; Jane Ingham

Pro-vice-chancellor, University of Leeds
- In office 1935–1939
- Preceded by: Paul Emile Auguste Barbier
- Succeeded by: Matthew John Stewart
- In office 1941–1941
- Preceded by: Matthew John Stewart
- Succeeded by: John David Ivor Hughes

Military service
- Allegiance: United Kingdom
- Branch: British Army
- Service years: 1914–1919
- Rank: Captain
- Corps: 1914: BEF; 1915: Intelligence Corps
- Conflict: World War I
- Awards: 1917: Distinguished Service Order (DSO); 1919: Chevalier de L'Ordre de la Couronne de Belgique (transl. Knight of the Order of the Crown of Belgium)

Joseph Hubert Priestley DSO FLS (né Priestlay; 5 October 1883 – 31 October 1944) was a British lecturer in botany at University College, Bristol, and professor of botany and pro-vice-chancellor at the University of Leeds. He has been described as a gifted teacher who attracted many graduate research students to Leeds. He was the eldest child of a Tewkesbury head teacher and the elder brother of Raymond Priestley, the British geologist and Antarctic explorer. He was educated at his father's school and University College, Bristol. In 1904, he was appointed a lecturer in botany at the University College and published research on photosynthesis and the effect of electricity on plants. He was elected a fellow of the Linnean Society, and in 1910, he was appointed consulting botanist to the Bath and West and Southern Counties Society.

In 1911, he married Marion Ethel Young at Bristol, and in the same year, he was appointed professor of botany at the University of Leeds. He served in the British Army during World War I, receiving a commission as a captain. In August 1914, he was sent to France with the British Expeditionary Force, and for the remainder of the war, he was seconded to the Intelligence Corps. He was twice mentioned in dispatches, and awarded the Distinguished Service Order (DSO) in 1917 and the Chevalier de L'Ordre de la Couronne de Belgique in 1919. On his return to Leeds, he embarked on a programme of research that encompassed the structure and development of the growing points of plants, the effect of light on growth, cork formation, and plant propagation.

In 1922, he was appointed dean of the faculty of science, and in 1925, he was elected president of the Yorkshire Naturalists' Union. In the following year, he taught a postgraduate course at the University of California, Berkeley. He was an active member of the British Association, the British Bryological Society, and the Forestry Commission. In 1935, he was elected pro-vice-chancellor, serving in that role until 1939. He was the first warden to the male students at Leeds and organised many social activities, including a staff dancing class and "botanical parties". He was a passionate cricket player and captained the staff team at Leeds. He died after a long illness at his home in Weetwood, Leeds.

== Early life ==
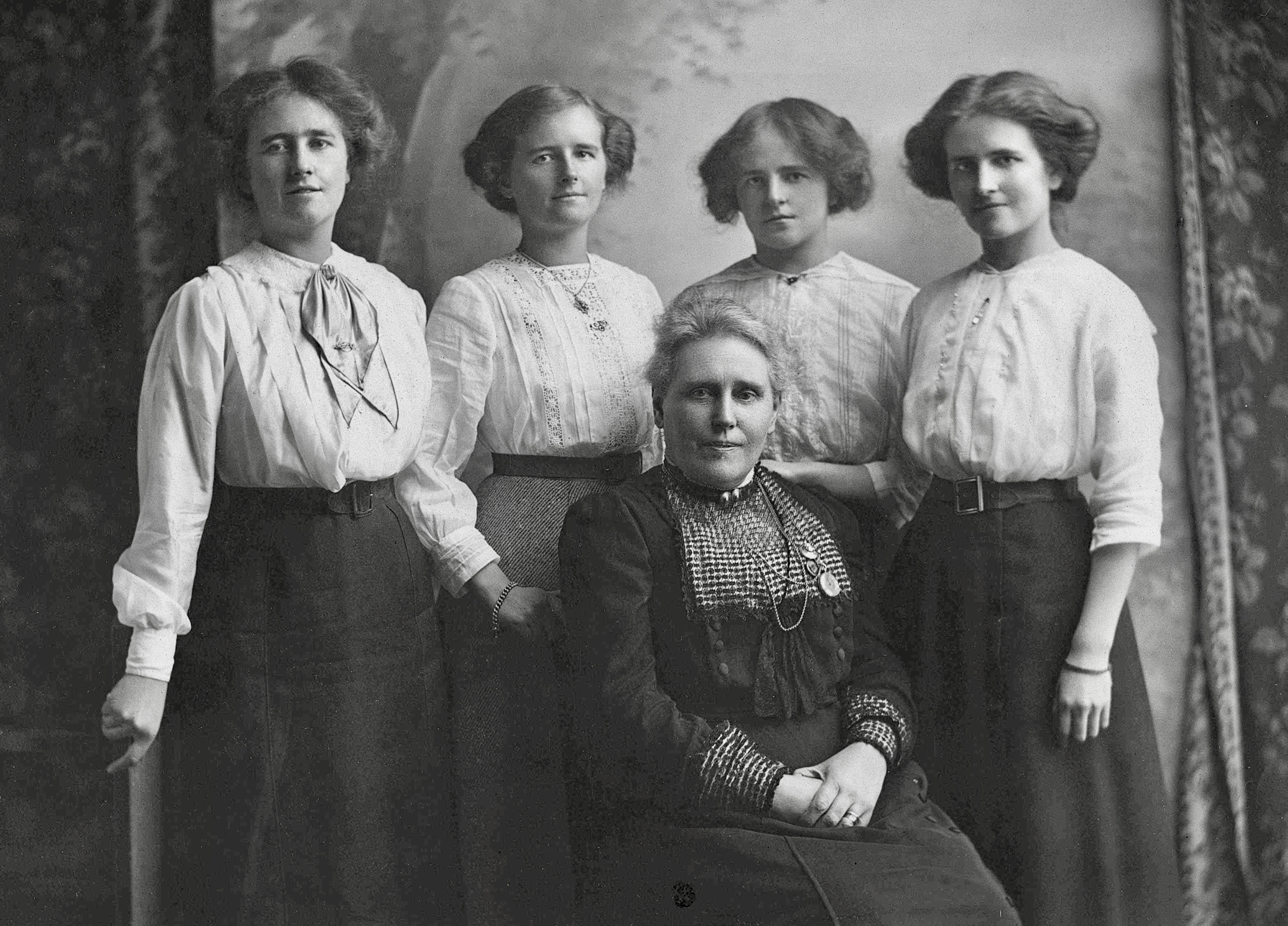
Priestley's mother and four sisters (from left to right), Edith, Doris, Joyce, and Olive, c. 1910

Priestley was born on 5 October 1883 at Abbey House school, Tewkesbury, Gloucestershire, and baptised at the Methodist chapel in Tewkesbury on 6 November 1883. (Note: Priestley was known as "Bert" by family and friends.) He was the eldest child of eight children of Joseph Edward Priestlay, then head teacher of the school, and Henrietta, née Rice. His mother was the second surviving daughter of Richard Rice of Tewkesbury. They had met at the Methodist chapel, and had married on 22 December 1881 at Tettenhall parish church, now in the city of Wolverhampton. The Priestley family name was spelt originally as "Priestlay". However, in the early 1900s, the name changes to "Priestley" and both spellings appear on family graves in Tewkesbury Cemetery.

In 1875, Priestley's father graduated from the University of London with a second class Bachelor of Arts degree in animal physiology. He was appointed head teacher of Abbey House school following the death of his father, Joseph Priestley, on 13 November 1876, and remained as head until his retirement in 1917. He moved to Bristol and joined the staff of Grace, Darbyshire, and Todd, a local firm of accountants. He died on 9 December 1921, aged 67, at a nursing home in Clifton, and was interred in Canford Cemetery, Westbury-on-Trym, near Bristol. Henrietta died on 24 September 1929, aged 76, at Bishopston, Bristol.

Priestley's brothers, Stanley and Donald, died on active service during World War I. Stanley left Tewkesbury in 1912 to follow Priestley to the University of Leeds where he became a member of the University Officers' Training Corps. Donald was a commercial traveller working for their mother's family firm, William Rice and Company, corn millers and seed merchants at Tewkesbury. His brother, Raymond, was a geologist in Robert Falcon Scott's ill-fated Terra Nova Expedition to the Antarctic from 1910 to 1913.

Priestley's sisters were Edith, Doris, Joyce, and Olive. Edith married Charles Seymour "Silas" Wright and Doris married Thomas Griffith "Grif" Taylor, both of whom were members of Scott's expedition. Doris first met Taylor in July 1913, and at that time, was acting as Priestley's secretary. Joyce married Herbert William Merrell, who served with the Gloucester Regiment in World War I, and in later life, was an accountant on the staff of the University of Leeds.

The family were Methodists, and on Sundays, Priestley was required to attend two religious services and Sunday school. They were also passionate cricket players. Stanley was regarded as a good bowler and Donald played for Gloucestershire from 1909 to 1910. Priestley himself would later play for the University College, Bristol, and captain the staff team at the University of Leeds.

== Education ==
Priestley, along with his brothers, was educated at his father's school in Tewkesbury. (Note: In later life, Priestley was a member of the Old Theocsbrian Society, the Abbey House school alumni association, and a regular attendee at the association's annual dinner.) He passed his Cambridge Local Examination in December 1897 with unremarkable third class honours. In July 1898, he passed an elementary examination in Pitman shorthand, before taking a physical geography course at the Science Hall on Oldbury Road, Tewkesbury. He passed this course with first class honours in June 1899. In February 1900, he gained a first class pass in the University of London matriculation examination. In July 1901, the University College, Bristol, awarded him a Capper Pass metallurgical scholarship of twenty-five pounds (equivalent to two thousand and thirty pounds in 2019).

Though primarily a botany student, Priestley took courses in chemistry and physics at Bristol, and in August 1901, he gained a first class pass in the University of London intermediate science examination. (Note: University College, Bristol, originated as a college teaching external degrees of the University of London. See the history of the external examination system at the University of London Worldwide.) In November 1902, the college awarded him a John Stewart Scholarship, (Note: The scholarship was bequeathed by John Stewart of Montpelier, Bristol, and was worth twenty pounds.) and in the following month, he was elected to the committee of the college's chemical society. In November 1903, Priestley passed his final BSc examination with first class honours in botany. In the same month, he was awarded a probationary bursary worth seventy pounds, by the Commissioners for the Exhibition of 1851, to study the cell biology of rust fungi.

== Career ==
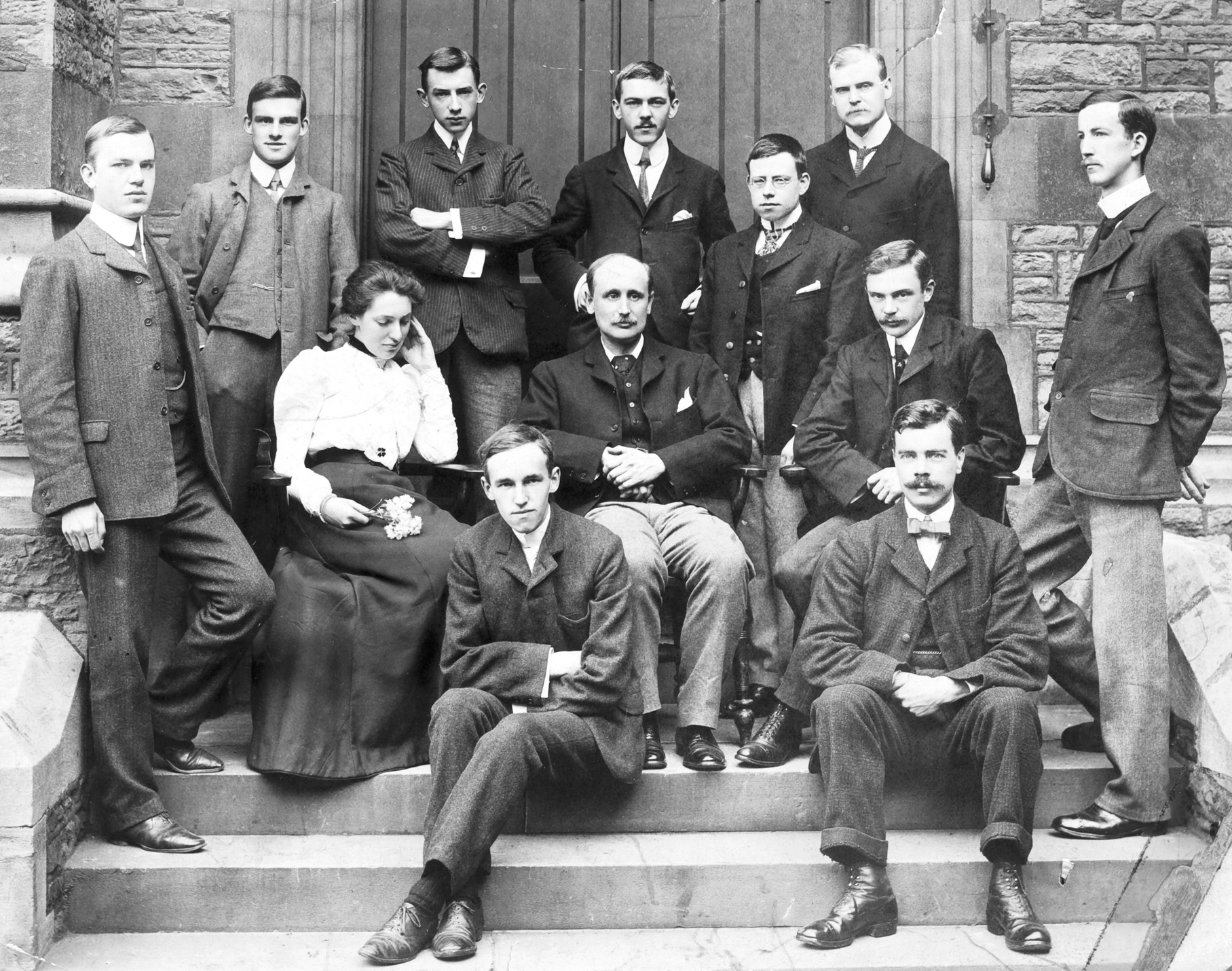
Physics staff and senior students at University College, Bristol, in 1902. Priestley is seated in the front row on the left.

In November 1904, Priestley was made an associate of the college. In January 1905, he was appointed temporary lecturer in botany, in succession to George Brebner, who had died on 23 December 1904. This appointment was made permanent by the college council on 19 July 1905 at an annual salary of £120 (equivalent to £12,600 in 2025). He and Raymond, who was then studying geography at the college, lodged together for two years on the top floor of a Bristol boarding house. They lived on fifty shillings a week and lunch would often consist of a bun and a glass of milk.

Priestley's early research examined the process and products of photosynthesis. In 1906, he published a paper with Francis Usher, later a reader in colloid chemistry at the University of Leeds, that postulated that chlorophyll in vitro is reduced to formaldehyde in the presence of carbon dioxide and light. Vernon Herbert Blackman, professor of botany at the University of Leeds whom Priestley would succeed in 1911, considered the evidence unsatisfactory. Charles Horne Warner, working in Blackman's laboratory, found that the formation of formaldehyde was independent of the presence of carbon dioxide, and in fact, formaldehyde was formed as a by-product of the oxidation of chlorophyll.

In 1908, the college received a grant of fifty pounds from the Board of Agriculture to enable the biology department to conduct research on the effect of electricity on plants. In an initial experiment, Priestley ran electrical wires above plants in greenhouses at Bitton, South Gloucestershire, to demonstrate that electricity could stimulate the growth of the plants. At the time, it was thought that an electric current could increase plant respiration, transpiration, and starch formation. He noted that young wheat leaves from electrified plots were, "in the opinion of many observers, darker green than the control plants." He suggested that the darker green could result from a continuous amount of nitrates being added to the soil, in a similar manner to the oxidation of atmospheric nitrogen by lightning. In one soil test, he found three times the amount of nitrogen in the soil than in the control plots. However, it is now generally accepted that there are no beneficial effects from exposing plants to electric fields.

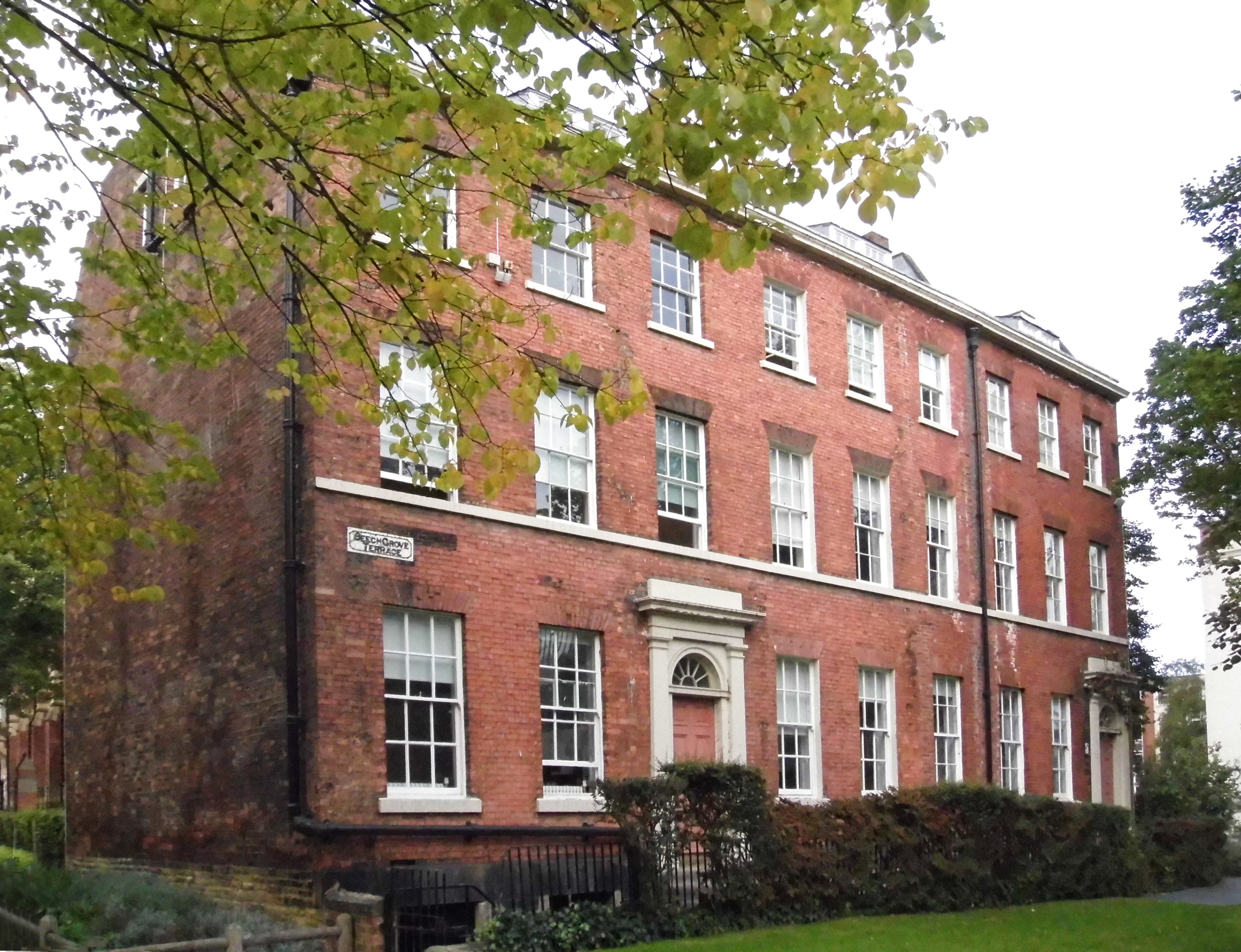
Botany House at the University of Leeds where Priestley was professor of botany

In 1906, Priestley was elected as honorary secretary to the Bristol Naturalists' Society. He was also president of the college's botanical club and was a local secretary for the Cotteswold Naturalists' field club. He joined the Bristol Fabian Society and was president of the Montpelier adult school. In January 1908, he was elected a fellow of the Linnean Society. In 1910, he was appointed consulting botanist to the Bath and West and Southern Counties Society, after William Carruthers had resigned in the previous year. In 1911, Priestley was appointed professor of botany at the University of Leeds, succeeding Blackman, who had left to join the Institute of Vegetable Physiology at Imperial College London. Otto Vernon Darbishire was appointed to replace Priestley as lecturer in botany at the University of Bristol. In 1914, Priestley was appointed an examiner in the Natural Science Tripos at Cambridge.

Priestley's university work was interrupted by World War I. He had been in command of the University Officers' Training Corps at both Bristol and Leeds, and on 9 August 1914, he was sent to France with the British Expeditionary Force. In his absence, Walter Garstang, then professor of zoology at the University of Leeds, assumed responsibility for the botany department. For the remainder of the war, he served in the Intelligence Brigade of the general staff until January 1919. He was twice mentioned in dispatches, and awarded the Distinguished Service Order (DSO) in the King's 1917 Birthday Honours, and in 1919, the Chevalier de L'Ordre de la Couronne de Belgique (transl. Knight of the Order of the Crown of Belgium). (Note: The announcement of the award of the Chevalier de L'Ordre de la Couronne de Belgique was not made in The London Gazette until 23 August 1921.)

On his return to Leeds, Priestley embarked on a programme of research that encompassed the structure and development of the growing points of plants, the effect of light on growth, cork formation, and plant propagation. He had been influenced by the work of Albert Frey-Wyssling on cell walls and William Henry Lang's research on plant morphology and anatomy. In 1924, he was elected president of the Yorkshire Naturalists' Union and was a member of the British Bryological Society. In December 1926, he travelled to California to teach a postgraduate course at the University of California, Berkeley. Otis Freeman Curtis came to Leeds from Cornell University, Ithaca, New York, to cover his four-month absence.

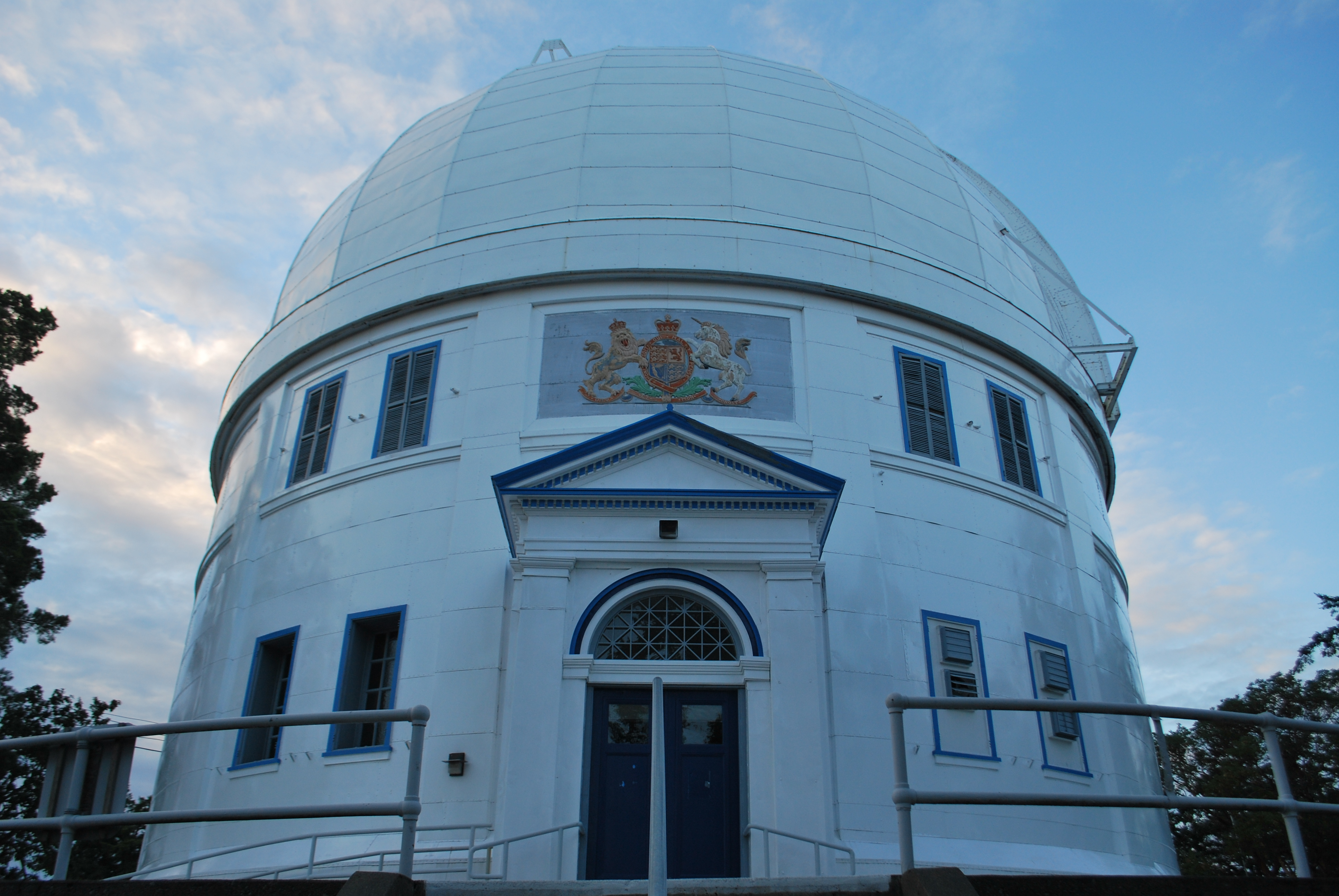
Dominion Astrophysical Observatory at Saanich, British Columbia, that Priestley visited in 1924 as a member of the British Association

Priestley was a member of the British Association and was president of the botany section in 1932. He attended many of the association's annual meetings, including the 1924 meeting in Toronto, Ontario, where he took the opportunity to visit the Dominion Astrophysical Observatory at Saanich, British Columbia. In 1929, he and Lorna I. Scott, co-author of Priestley's textbook An Introduction to Botany, attended the association's meeting in South Africa, based at the universities of Cape Town and Witwatersrand, Johannesburg. Along with five hundred other scientists, they boarded the Union‑Castle steamship Llandovery Castle, on 27 June 1929 at the Port of Tilbury. They stopped at Saint Helena, in the South Atlantic Ocean, to the west of south-western Africa, where they collected a number of bryophyte specimens.

In 1922, Priestley was appointed dean of the faculty of science, and later, became the first warden to the male students at Leeds. On 1 July 1935, he succeeded Paul Emile Auguste Barbier, professor of French, as pro-vice-chancellor of the university. Matthew John Stewart, professor of paleontology, succeeded him in June 1939. In 1941, the senate appointed Priestley as pro-vice-chancellor for a second term, after Bernard Mouat Jones, then vice-chancellor, had left the University in February to complete National Service. Mouat Jones returned to the University in October and Priestley was succeeded as pro-vice-chancellor by John David Ivor Hughes, professor of law at the university.

== Personal life ==
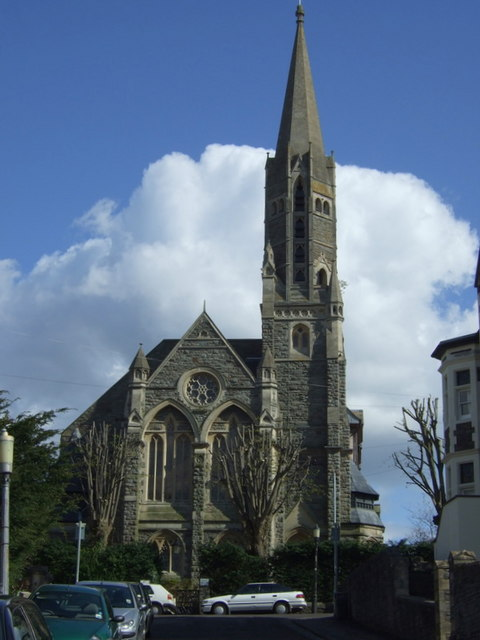
Former Congregational church in Bishopston, Bristol, where Priestley was married

Priestley married Marion Ethel Young before leaving Bristol to take up his appointment as professor of botany at the University of Leeds. Marion was the younger daughter of Anthony and Sarah Young of Eastfield Road, Cotham, Bristol. The wedding took place on 12 August 1911 at the Congregational church in Bishopston, Bristol. (Note: The church was founded in 1878 in memory of David Thomas, the then minister at Highbury Congregational Chapel. The church was demolished in 1984.) It was a quiet ceremony, limited to close family, as his paternal grandmother, Annie, had died only a few weeks before on 26 July 1911. The honeymoon was spent in West Wales. Marion Ethel was a keen amateur botanist, and along with Priestley, was a member of the British Mycological Society. She organised many social activities at the University of Leeds, including a staff dancing class and "botanical parties" to which all botany staff and students were invited. She died at Addenbrooke's Hospital, Cambridge, on 25 July 1965, aged 79, and the funeral service was held on 2 August 1965 at St Mary's church, Great Shelford, followed by cremation at Cambridge Crematorium.

Their elder daughter, Phyllis Mary, was born at Leeds on 25 January 1920. She was educated at Lawnswood High School, Leeds, and Cheltenham Ladies' College. In 1939, she was an exhibitioner at Girton College, Cambridge, graduating with a BA degree in 1942, and a MA in 1947. She married John Carlisle Cullen, of Belfast, on 3 January 1946 at St Chad's Church, Far Headingley, Leeds. Cullen was a graduate of Queen's University Belfast and a former researcher at the National Institute of Agricultural Botany at Cambridge. She died after a long illness at Clifton, Bristol, on 22 May 1999. A Requiem Mass was held at Clifton Cathedral on 2 June 1999 followed by cremation at South Bristol crematorium. Michael Cullen, Phyllis Mary's son and Priestley's grandson, is a former senior research fellow at the Met Office and visiting professor in mathematics at the University of Reading.

Their younger daughter, Ann Elizabeth, was born at Leeds on 14 May 1923. She was educated at the same schools as her sister, and in 1942, entered Girton College as an exhibitioner to study geography. From 1944 to 1945, she was president of the Cambridge University Women's Boat Club. In 1945, she graduated with a BA and won the Thèrèse Montefiore Memorial Prize. From 1945, she was a Tucker-Price research fellow working on water erosion and was awarded a MA by the University of Cambridge in 1949. From 1946 to 1951, she was a lecturer in geography at the University of Leeds, and from 1956, was head of geography and divinity at Perse School for Girls, Panton Street, Cambridge. By 1954, she was a member of the Institute of British Geographers, and in 1966, she was secretary to the Cambridge branch of the Christian Education Movement. She later joined the Cambridgeshire and Isle of Ely Naturalists' Trust and was clerk of Great Shelford parish council. She died at York on 27 January 1986 and was cremated at York crematorium. Her ashes were interred at Lawnswood cemetery in Leeds.

== Death and legacy ==
[Priestley was] sometimes didactic, often provocative, always interesting and, as a whole, one of the most colourful persons in biology.

— William Pearsall, Priestley's obituary in Nature.

At the end of December 1935, Priestley was seriously ill and underwent a major operation on 16 January 1936. He died after a long illness at his home in Weetwood, Leeds, on 31 October 1944, and the funeral was held at Lawnswood crematorium in the morning on 3 November 1944. A large number of university staff attended including Mouat Jones, Bonamy Dobrée, and Arthur Stanley Turberville. There were also representatives from the Joint Matriculation Board, the Forestry Commission, and James Digby Firth represented the Yorkshire Naturalists' Union and the Leeds Naturalists' Club. Priestley's ashes were later scattered on the gardens of rest at the crematorium. Lorna I. Scott managed the botany department for eighteen months until Irene Manton was appointed on 15 January 1946.

After Priestley's death, a memorial trust fund was established to provide grants to botany students at the University of Leeds. In December 1946, his brother Raymond, then vice-chancellor of the University of Birmingham, gifted money to Tewkesbury Grammar School to provide for an annual science prize, named the "Joseph Hubert Priestley Prize" in memory of his brother. Priestley's collection of fossils now forms part of the herbarium at the Leeds Discovery Centre. A major part of the collection was formed from a bequest made to the University of Leeds by Ida Mary Roper, Priestley's friend and colleague from University College, Bristol.

Edward Cocking, a British plant scientist, has described Priestley as "a highly unorthodox physiological botanist", and Priestley was often the first to admit that some of his early work had been published prematurely. Nevertheless, he was a gifted teacher who attracted many graduate research students to Leeds. Lorna I. Scott wrote in his obituary:

[Priestley] inspired many generations of students ... a remarkably gifted teacher, as one with a mind alive to inspire research ...[and] never too busy or too inaccessible to help even the most junior of his assistants or students.

== Selected publications ==
=== Books and reports ===
- Priestley, Joseph Hubert (1 July 1929). Tansley, Arthur George (ed.). "The Biology of the Living Chloroplast. A Critical Abstract of Professor Lubimenko's Review of Recent Russian Work". New Phytologist. 28 (3). London: Wheldon & Wesley: 197–217. doi:10.1111/j.1469-8137.1929.tb06755.x. ISSN 0028-646X. JSTOR 2427950. See also Vladimir Nikolaevich Lyubimenko.
- Priestley, Joseph Hubert; et al. (September 1933). "William Bateson 1861 to 1926". The Post Victorians. William Ralph Inge (1st ed.). London: Ivor Nicholson and Watson. pp. 39–55. OCLC 882765721. See William Bateson.
- Priestley, Joseph Hubert; Scott, Lorna Iris; Harrison, Edith (1964) [First published 1938]. An Introduction to Botany, with special reference to the structure of the flowering plant. Illustrated by Marjorie Edith Malins and Lorna Iris Scott. London: Longmans, Green & Co. pp. 1–705. OCLC 1150024139.

=== Effect of electricity ===
- Priestley, Joseph Hubert (1906). "The Effect of Electricity upon Plants". Proceedings. 4th. 1 (Part 3). Bristol: Bristol Naturalists' Society: 192–203. ISSN 0068-1040. OCLC 1257428441. Priestley was also the honorary secretary society and editor of the journal.
- Priestley, Joseph Hubert (April 1910). "Overhead Electric Discharges and Plant Growth". The Journal of the Board of Agriculture. 17 (1). London: His Majesty's Stationery Office: 16–28. OCLC 220755415.
- Priestley, Joseph Hubert (October 1913). "Experiments on the Application of Electricity to Crop Production". The Journal of the Board of Agriculture. 20 (7). London: His Majesty's Stationery Office: 582–594. OCLC 220755415.
- Jørgensen, Ingvar; Priestley, Joseph Hubert (September 1914). "The Distribution of the Overhead Electrical Discharge Employed in Recent Agricultural Experiments". The Journal of Agricultural Science. 6 (3). Cambridge: Oxford University Press: 337–348. doi:10.1017/S002185960000188X. ISSN 0021-8596. S2CID 86429119. Received 16 May 1914.
- Priestley, Joseph Hubert; Knight, Robert Cedric (22 May 1913). "On the Nature of the Toxic Action of Electric Discharge upon Bacillus coli communis". Proceedings of the Royal Society. Series B, Containing Papers of a Biological Character. 86 (588). London: Royal Society: 348–354. Bibcode:1913RSPSB..86..348P. doi:10.1098/rspb.1913.0031. ISSN 0950-1193. JSTOR 80467. Communicated by John Bretland Farmer. Received 13 February 1913. Refereed by Arthur Harden in February 1913.

=== Photosynthesis ===
- Usher, Francis Lawry; Priestley, Joseph Hubert (27 March 1906). "A Study of the Mechanism of Carbon Assimilation in Green Plants". Proceedings of the Royal Society. Series B, Containing Papers of a Biological Character. 77 (518). London: Royal Society: 369–376. Bibcode:1906RSPSB..77..369U. doi:10.1098/rspb.1906.0023. ISSN 0950-1193. JSTOR 80079. Communicated by Morris William Travers. Received 16 December 1905. Refereed by Horace Tabberer Brown in January 1906.
- Usher, Francis Lawry; Priestley, Joseph Hubert (24 October 1906). "The Mechanism of Carbon Assimilation in Green Plants: The Photolytic Decomposition of Carbon Dioxide in vitro". Proceedings of the Royal Society. Series B, Containing Papers of a Biological Character. 78 (526). London: Royal Society: 318–327. Bibcode:1906RSPSB..78..318U. doi:10.1098/rspb.1906.0067. ISSN 0950-1193. JSTOR 80141. Communicated by Morris William Travers. Received 30 April 1906. Refereed by Horace Tabberer Brown in May 1906.
- Usher, Francis Lawry; Priestley, Joseph Hubert (20 July 1911). "The Mechanism of Carbon Assimilation: Part III". Proceedings of the Royal Society. Series B, Containing Papers of a Biological Character. 84 (569). London: Royal Society: 101–112. Bibcode:1911RSPSB..84..101U. doi:10.1098/rspb.1911.0052. ISSN 0950-1193. JSTOR 80424. Communicated by Morris William Travers. Received 13 April 1911.

=== Disease ===
- Priestley, Joseph Hubert; Lechmere, Arthur Eckley (December 1910). "A Bacterial Disease of Swedes". The Journal of Agricultural Science. 3 (4). Cambridge: Oxford University Press: 390–397. doi:10.1017/S0021859600001180. ISSN 0021-8596. S2CID 86324616.

=== Salt tolerance ===
- Priestley, Joseph Hubert (1911). Henderson, William Dawson (ed.). "The Pelophilous Formation of the Left Bank of the Severn Estuary". Proceedings. 4th. 3 (Part 1). Bristol: Bristol Naturalists' Society: 9–25. ISSN 0068-1040. OCLC 1257428441. Halophytes that grow on the banks of the Severn Estuary.

=== Anatomy of plants ===
- Priestley, Joseph Hubert (24 March 1921). Tansley, Arthur George (ed.). "Suberin and Cutin". New Phytologist. 20 (1). London: Wheldon & Wesley: 17–29. doi:10.1111/j.1469-8137.1921.tb05765.x. ISSN 0028-646X. JSTOR 2428010.
- Priestley, Joseph Hubert (25 April 1922). Tansley, Arthur George (ed.). "I. Introduction". New Phytologist. 21 (2). London: Wheldon & Wesley: 58–61. doi:10.1111/j.1469-8137.1922.tb07588.x. ISSN 0028-646X. JSTOR 2428134.
- Priestley, Joseph Hubert; Armstead, Dorothy (25 April 1922). Tansley, Arthur George (ed.). "II. The Physiological Relation of the Surrounding Tissue to the Xylem and its Contents". New Phytologist. 21 (2). London: Wheldon & Wesley: 62–80. doi:10.1111/j.1469-8137.1922.tb07589.x. ISSN 0028-646X. JSTOR 2428135.
- Priestley, Joseph Hubert; North, Edith E. (1 June 1922). Tansley, Arthur George (ed.). "III. The Structure of the Endodermis in Relation to its Function". New Phytologist. 21 (3). London: Wheldon & Wesley: 113–139. doi:10.1111/j.1469-8137.1922.tb07593.x. ISSN 0028-646X. JSTOR 2428118.
- Priestley, Joseph Hubert; Tupper-Carey, Rose Marie (7 November 1922). Tansley, Arthur George (ed.). "IV. The Water Relations of the Plant Growing Point". New Phytologist. 21 (4). London: Wheldon & Wesley: 210–229. doi:10.1111/j.1469-8137.1922.tb07598.x. ISSN 0028-646X. JSTOR 2428025.
- Priestley, Joseph Hubert; Woffenden, Lettice May (18 December 1922). Tansley, Arthur George (ed.). "V. Causal Factors in Cork Formation". New Phytologist. 21 (5). London: Wheldon & Wesley: 252–268. doi:10.1111/j.1469-8137.1922.tb07603.x. ISSN 0028-646X. JSTOR 2428084.
- Priestley, Joseph Hubert; Ewing, James (20 February 1923). Tansley, Arthur George (ed.). "VI. Etiolation (Concluded)". New Phytologist. 22 (1). London: Wheldon & Wesley: 30–44. doi:10.1111/j.1469-8137.1923.tb06594.x. ISSN 0028-646X. JSTOR 2427695.
- Scott, Lorna Iris; Priestley, Joseph Hubert (5 February 1925). "Leaf and Stem Anatomy of Tradescantia fluminensis". Botanical Journal of the Linnean Society. 47 (312). London: Linnean Society of London: 1–28. doi:10.1111/j.1095-8339.1925.tb00500.x. ISSN 0024-4074. OCLC 4649701058. Authority: José Mariano de Conceição Vellozo.

=== Composition of the cell wall ===
- Tupper-Carey, Rose Marie; Priestley, Joseph Hubert (2 July 1923). "The composition of the cell- wall at the apical meristem of stem and root". Proceedings of the Royal Society. Series B, Containing Papers of a Biological Character. 95 (665). London: Royal Society: 109–131. Bibcode:1923RSPSB..95..109T. doi:10.1098/rspb.1923.0026. ISSN 0950-1193. JSTOR 80874. Communicated by Frederick Frost Blackman. Received 25 April 1923. Refereed by William Lawrence Balls in May 1923.
- Lee, Beatrice; Priestley, Joseph Hubert (July 1924). Blackman, Vernon Herbert; Thaxter, Roland (eds.). "The Plant Cuticle: I. Its Structure, Distribution, and Function". Annals of Botany. 38 (151). London: Humphrey Sumner Milford, Oxford University Press: 525–545. doi:10.1093/oxfordjournals.aob.a089915. ISSN 1095-8290. JSTOR 43236936.
- Tupper-Carey, Rose Marie; Priestley, Joseph Hubert (23 July 1924). Tansley, Arthur George (ed.). "The Cell Wall in the Radicle of Vicia faba and the Shape of the Meristematic Cells". New Phytologist. 23 (3). London: Wheldon & Wesley: 156–159. doi:10.1111/j.1469-8137.1924.tb06630.x. ISSN 0028-646X. JSTOR 2427781.
- Priestley, Joseph Hubert; Rhodes, Edgar (1 July 1926). "On the Macro-Chemistry of the endodermis". Proceedings of the Royal Society. Series B, Containing Papers of a Biological Character. 100 (701). London: Royal Society: 119–128. Bibcode:1926RSPSB.100..119P. doi:10.1098/rspb.1926.0038. ISSN 0950-1193. JSTOR 81190. Communicated by Frederick Frost Blackman. Received 13 April 1926. Refereed by Vernon Herbert Blackman in April 1926.

=== Light and growth ===
- Priestley, Joseph Hubert (31 December 1925). Tansley, Arthur George (ed.). "I. The Effect of Brief Light Exposure Upon Etiolated Plants". New Phytologist. 24 (5). London: Wheldon & Wesley: 271–283. doi:10.1111/j.1469-8137.1925.tb06670.x. ISSN 0028-646X. JSTOR 2427720.
- Priestley, Joseph Hubert (31 July 1926). Tansley, Arthur George (ed.). "II. On the Anatomy of Etiolated Plants". New Phytologist. 25 (3). London: Wheldon & Wesley: 145–170. doi:10.1111/j.1469-8137.1926.tb06688.x. ISSN 0028-646X. JSTOR 2427687.
- Priestley, Joseph Hubert (30 October 1926). Tansley, Arthur George (ed.). "III. An Interpretation of Phototropic Growth Curvatures". New Phytologist. 25 (4). London: Wheldon & Wesley: 213–226. doi:10.1111/j.1469-8137.1926.tb06692.x. ISSN 0028-646X. JSTOR 2428124.
- Priestley, Joseph Hubert (30 October 1926). Tansley, Arthur George (ed.). "IV. An Examination of the Phototropic Mechanism Concerned in the Curvature of Coleoptiles of the Gramineae". New Phytologist. 25 (4). London: Wheldon & Wesley: 227–247. doi:10.1111/j.1469-8137.1926.tb06693.x. ISSN 0028-646X. JSTOR 2428125.
- Scott, Lorna Iris; Priestley, Joseph Hubert (October 1925). Pearsall, William Harold; Grist, William Robinson (eds.). "The Bud Scale". The Naturalist (718). London: A. Brown and Sons: 217–228. OCLC 456084301.

=== Forestry ===
- Priestley, Joseph Hubert (January 1928). Sheppard, Thomas; Woodhead, Thomas William (eds.). "Secondary Foliage in Yorkshire Trees and Shrubs". The Naturalist (626). London: A. Brown and Sons: 19–21. OCLC 456084301.
- Priestley, Joseph Hubert (1 October 1935). Steven, Henry Marshall (ed.). "Radial Growth and Extension Growth in the Tree". Forestry. 9 (2). The Society of Foresters of Great Britain. Oxford: Oxford University Press: 84–95. doi:10.1093/oxfordjournals.forestry.a063450. ISSN 0015-752X. OCLC 6941205096.

=== Vegetative propagation ===
- Priestley, Joseph Hubert (29 January 1926). Chittenden, Frederick James (ed.). "Problems of Vegetative Propagation". Journal of the Royal Horticultural Society. 51 (Part 1). London: Royal Horticultural Society: 1–16. OCLC 999431049. Masters Lectures for 1925. Read 7 April 1925 and 23 June 1925.
- Priestley, Joseph Hubert; Swingle, Charles Fletcher (December 1929). Vegetative Propagation from the Standpoint of Plant Anatomy (Report). Technical Bulletin 151. Washington: United States Department of Agriculture. pp. 1–98. hdl:2027/uiug.30112019336897. OCLC 784311303.

=== Cambial tissue activity ===
- Priestley, Joseph Hubert (11 March 1929). Tansley, Arthur George (ed.). "Cell Growth and Cell Division in the Shoot of the Flowering Plant". New Phytologist. 28 (1). London: Wheldon & Wesley: 54–81. doi:10.1111/j.1469-8137.1929.tb06747.x. ISSN 0028-646X. JSTOR 2428042. Communicated in September 1928 at the British Association meeting in Glasgow to a joint meeting of Sections D, I and K, and organised by the Society for Experimental Biology.
- Priestley, Joseph Hubert (29 March 1930). Tansley, Arthur George (ed.). "I. Contrasted Types of Cambial Activity". New Phytologist. 29 (1). Cambridge: Cambridge University Press: 56–73. doi:10.1111/j.1469-8137.1930.tb06775.x. ISSN 0028-646X. JSTOR 2428346. The paper was communicated to the Department of Forestry (K section), at the British Science Association meeting at Glasgow in September 1928.
- Priestley, Joseph Hubert (30 June 1930). Tansley, Arthur George (ed.). "II. The Concept of Sliding Growth". New Phytologist. 29 (2). Cambridge: Cambridge University Press: 96–140. doi:10.1111/j.1469-8137.1930.tb06983.x. ISSN 0028-646X. JSTOR 2428628.
- Priestley, Joseph Hubert (8 December 1930). Tansley, Arthur George (ed.). "III. The Seasonal Activity of the Cambium". New Phytologist. 29 (5). Cambridge: Cambridge University Press: 316–354. doi:10.1111/j.1469-8137.1930.tb07398.x. ISSN 0028-646X. JSTOR 2428433.

== See also ==
- Jane Ingham
- Irene Manton
- Plant development
- Raymond Priestley
- Adriance Sherwood Foster

== Footnotes ==
Academic offices
Preceded by Paul Emile Auguste Barbier	Pro-vice-chancellor, University of Leeds; 1935–1939	Succeeded by Matthew John Stewart
Preceded by Matthew John Stewart	Pro-vice-chancellor, University of Leeds; 1941–1941	Succeeded by John David Ivor Hughes
