= Jane Ingham =

English botanist and scientific translator (1897–1982)

- Ingham (left) with Albert Ingham (right) in 1966
- Born: Rose Marie Tupper‑Carey; 15 August 1897; Leeds, England
- Died: 10 September 1982 (aged 85); Cambridge, England
- Education: University of Leeds (1928: MSc)
- Spouse: Albert Ingham (m. 1932; died 1967)
- Children: 2
- Relatives: Michael Sadleir (brother-in-law)
- Scientific career
- Fields: Apical meristems; Gravitropism; Plant genetics; Plant physiology; Secondary growth
- Workplaces: Citadel Hill Laboratory, Marine Biological Association of the United Kingdom, Plymouth; Botany Department, University of Leeds; Bureau of Plant and Crop Genetics, Cambridge
- Thesis: Geotropism or Gravity and Growth (1928)
- Academic advisors: Joseph Hubert Priestley

Rose Marie "Jane" Ingham (née Tupper‑Carey /ˌtˈʌpə ˈkɛəri/; 15 August 1897 – 10 September 1982) was an English botanist and scientific translator. She was appointed research assistant to Joseph Hubert Priestley in the Botany Department at the University of Leeds, and together, they were the first to separate cell walls from the root tip of broad beans. They analysed these cell walls and concluded that they contained protein. She carried out experiments on the cork layer of trees to study how cells function under a change of orientation and found profound differences in cell division and elongation in the epidermal layer of plants.

At Leeds, Ingham was appointed sub-warden of Weetwood Hall, and honorary secretary of the British-Italian League. In 1930, she joined the Imperial Bureau of Plant and Crop Genetics at the School of Agriculture in Cambridge, England, as a scientific officer and translator. The bureau was responsible for publishing a series of abstract journals on various aspects of crop breeding and genetics. In 1932, she married Albert Ingham, then a fellow and director of studies at King's College, Cambridge. Ingham spent the war years in Princeton, New Jersey, with her two sons, not wishing to return to England after travelling to the US just before the outbreak of World War II. In the last years of her life, she and her husband travelled extensively, and in 1982, she died at Cambridge.

== Early life ==
Ingham was born on 15 August 1897, at Cromer House, Cromer Terrace, Leeds, and baptised an Anglican in the Church of England at Donhead St Andrew, Wiltshire, on 14 September 1897. (Note: A number of sources call her by the name "Jane", including the title of her portrait by William Roberts, engagement announcement, death notice in The Times, and her husband's Royal Society memoir, and in most instances, note she was born Rose Marie.) She was the youngest daughter of Helen Mary Tupper‑Carey, née Chapman, and Albert Darell. They had married at Donhead St Andrew on 16 May 1890. Helen Mary was the daughter of Reverend Horace Edward Chapman, a former rector of Donhead St Andrew, and Adelaide Maria, née Fletcher. (Note: Chapman was a son of banker David Barclay Chapman, who in 1875, purchased the advowson of St Andrew Donhead, and presented Horace Edward as the rector.)

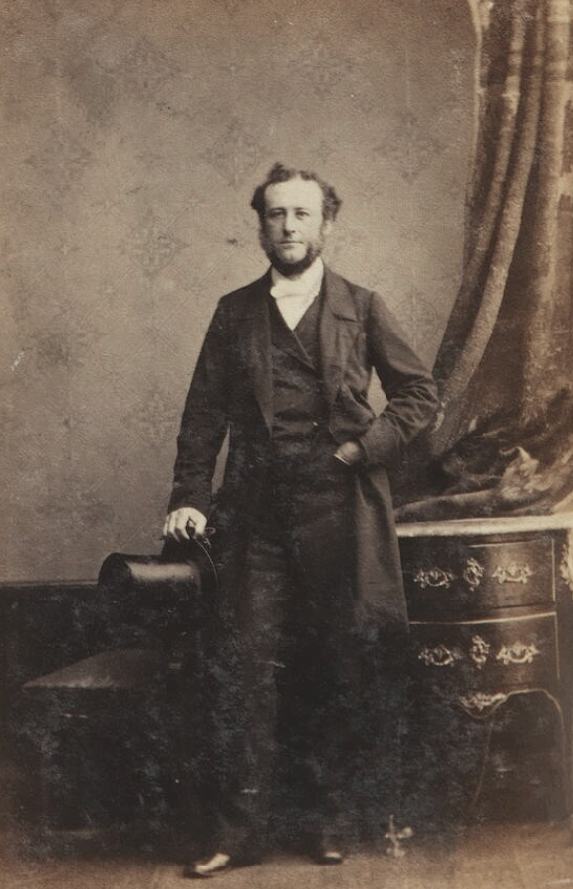
The Reverend Tupper Carey, Ingham's paternal grandfather

Ingham's father was the son of the Reverend Tupper Carey and Helen Jane, née Sandeman. (Note: On 3 November 1887, Albert Darell Carey changed his surname by deed poll to Tupper‑Carey.) He was educated at Eton and Christ Church, Oxford, and trained at Cuddesdon Theological College. He was curate of Leeds before being appointed rector of St Margaret's Church, Lowestoft. (Note: For a photograph of Albert Darell Tupper‑Carey taken at Lowestoft, see the photograph by Harry Jenkins at Lowestoft History.) In 1910, he was appointed canon residentiary of York, and later, became vicar of Huddersfield. From 1938, he was Chaplain to the King and at Monte Carlo. Despite his given name being Albert Darell, he was known as "Tupper" to his friends and was described by John Gilbert Lockhart in Cosmo Gordon Lang's biography as follows:

He could get at once on the easiest terms with every sort of person, from the 'drunks' of Leeds and Lowestoft to the millionaires of Monte Carlo ... Mercurial, overflowing with high spirits, irrepressible, he was everybody's friend and had a smile and a word for every passer-by in the streets of his parish.

Ingham had four siblings. Her eldest sister, Jacqueline Marjorie, married the Reverend Edgar James Mitchell, and after their marriage, they undertook missionary work in the Far East. (Note: Mitchell was rector of Donhead St Andrew from 1932 to 1952.) Ingham's elder sister, Edith, known as "Betty" to her friends and family, married the author Michael Sadleir. Sadleir was the only son of Sir Michael Ernest Sadler, a former vice-chancellor of the University of Leeds. Her elder brother, Humphrey Darell, was a tea planter in British East Africa before the outbreak of World War I. He was commissioned a lieutenant in the King's African Rifles, but was severely wounded in the right thigh during the East African campaign. He married Marjorie Gertrude Drakes, née Bredin, the widow of Charles Henry Drakes. In later life, he worked for the Colonial Service in Nigeria and was appointed a Companion of the Imperial Service Order in the Queen's 1959 Birthday Honours. (Note: For more information on Humphrey Darell, and a photograph of him taken in British East Africa, see Europeans In East Africa.) Her younger brother, Peter Charles Sandeman, was a captain in the Royal Navy. He married Anne Ethel Violet Montagu Dundas, the eldest daughter of Robert Neville Dundas and Cecil Mary, née Lancaster.

Tupper-Carey family tree

Rev. Tupper Carey	Helen Jane Sandeman	Rev. Horace Edward Chapman	Adelaide Maria Fletcher
Canon Albert Darell Tupper-Carey (né Carey)	Helen Mary Chapman
Jacqueline Marjorie Tupper-Carey	Rev. Edgar James Mitchell	Edith "Betty" Tupper-Carey	Michael Sadleir	Humphrey Darell Tupper-Carey	Marjorie Gertrude Drakes (née Bredin)	Rose Marie "Jane" Tupper-Carey	Albert Edward Ingham	Peter Charles Sandeman Tupper-Carey	Anne Ethel Violet Montagu Dundas
Michael Frank Ingham	Stephen Darell Ingham

== Education ==
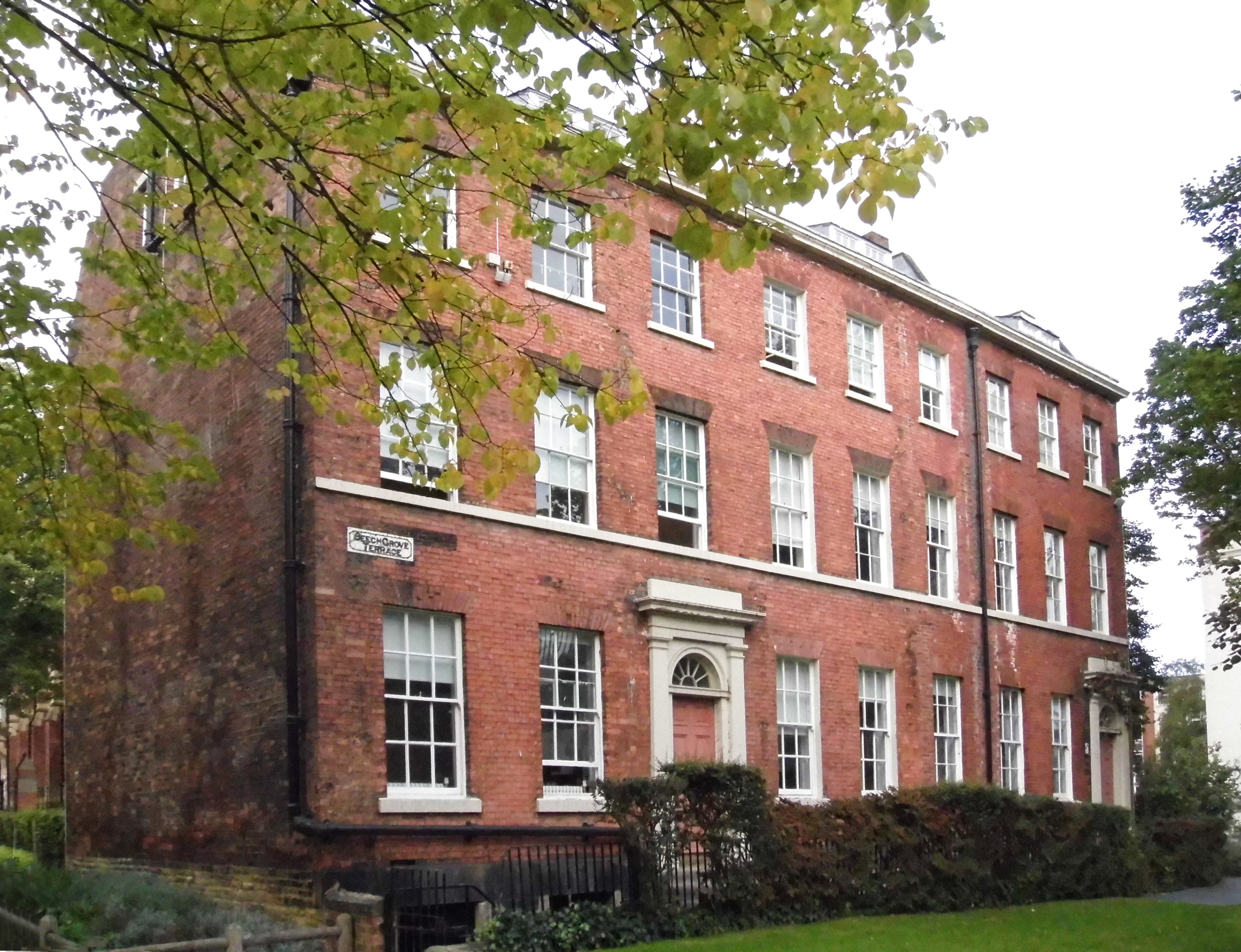
Botany House (south side) at the University of Leeds. Built in 1825, it is a Grade II listed building.

Ingham was educated at Claire House School, an all girl school in North Parade, Lowestoft, which specialised in the teaching of French. (Note: At the school, Ingham was commonly known as "Marie".) At the age of ten, she gained a prize in preliminary French examinations that were organised by the National Society of French Professors in England. She competed against candidates from the "best girls' schools in England", the written tests consisting of translation and composition (prose and poetry), essay, and questions on 17th to 19th century French literature. In the same year, she performed as Philaminte in the school's production of three scenes from Molière's Les Femmes Savantes. (Note: Ingham's father was in the audience to see her performance, and after the play had finished, he addressed the audience in French. Her mother was also fluent in French.)

Ingham showed an early interest in botany. In her youth, she would collect wildflowers to display at local parish shows. Her grandmother, Helen Jane Carey, was a keen amateur botanist and specimen collector, a popular and fashionable pastime in Victorian England. In 1916, Ingham entered the University of Leeds to study botany and, within three years, was a research student in the botany department at Leeds, studying water absorption at the growing point of plant roots. In 1919, Ingham studied general zoology at the Citadel Hill Laboratory of the Marine Biological Association, Plymouth. Annie Redman King, her friend from Weetwood Hall in Leeds, was a Ray Lankester investigator at the laboratory. (Note: Redman King was warden at the hall when Ingham was a post-graduate research student.)

== Career ==
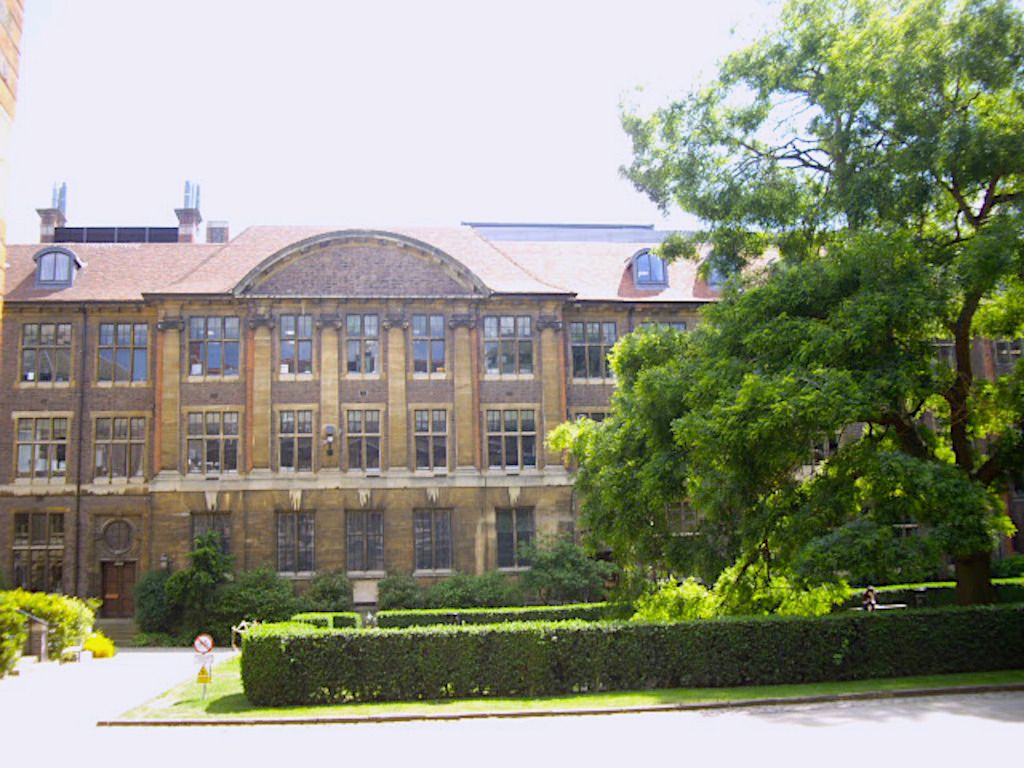
The Imperial Bureau of Plant and Crop Genetics, Plant Breeding Institute, in the School of Agriculture, Downing Street, Cambridge. It now houses the Department of Plant Sciences, University of Cambridge.

In January 1922, Ingham was appointed a research assistant in the botany department, where Joseph Hubert Priestley was Dean of the Faculty of Science. She and Priestley were the first to isolate cell walls from meristematic tissues in Vicia faba (broad beans). They analysed the walls for protein, cellulose, and pectin, and concluded that the walls contained protein. They also studied when cellulose is first produced by plants, the differences in shoot and root development, and the role of the cork cambium. These plant physiology studies were followed by two New Phytologist papers. She later provided unpublished results from these experiments on broad bean embryos to the British botanist William Pearsall. Described as a "brilliant scholar", she was awarded a MSc degree on 28 June 1928, for her research work and thesis titled Geotropism or Gravity and Growth.

In February 1930, Ingham joined the Imperial Bureau of Plant and Crop Genetics, at the Plant Breeding Institute, Cambridge, as a translator and scientific officer. Sir Rowland Biffen was the first director of the Cambridge bureau, and her supervisor, Penrhyn Stanley Hudson, was deputy director. (Note: Hudson ("Pen") was a remarkable linguist, who spoke most European languages fluently, including Russian and Ukrainian. His idea of a summer holiday was "to go to some distant place on a foreign freighter, practising the language, whatever it might be, with the crew.") She was fluent in French, Italian, German and Swedish, and as a whole, the bureau had been capable of dealing with Spanish, Dutch, and Russian. Abstracts were written on various aspects of plant breeding and genetics, with some of the foreign language papers requiring more complete translations. These abstracts were published in a quarterly journal called Plant Breeding Abstracts. In 1931, she attended the eighth conference of the Association of Special Libraries and Information Bureaux (ASLIB) at Oxford, where progress on ASLIB's newly-formed panel of expert translators was discussed. After her marriage, she worked from home translating most of the German documents, and in 1939, was put in charge of the bureau after Hudson fell ill.

== Personal life ==
Around 1922, Ingham sat for a portrait by William Roberts, the "English Cubist" artist. The finished painting was titled "Portrait of Miss Jane Tupper‑Carey" and was shown for the first time in November 1923 at New Chenil Galleries, Chelsea. By 1926, she had been appointed sub-warden at Weetwood Hall, the then university hall of residence for women students. In the same year, she was appointed the first honorary secretary of the Leeds branch of the British-Italian League. The League's aims were to found a chair in Italian at the University of Leeds and foster relations between the two countries.

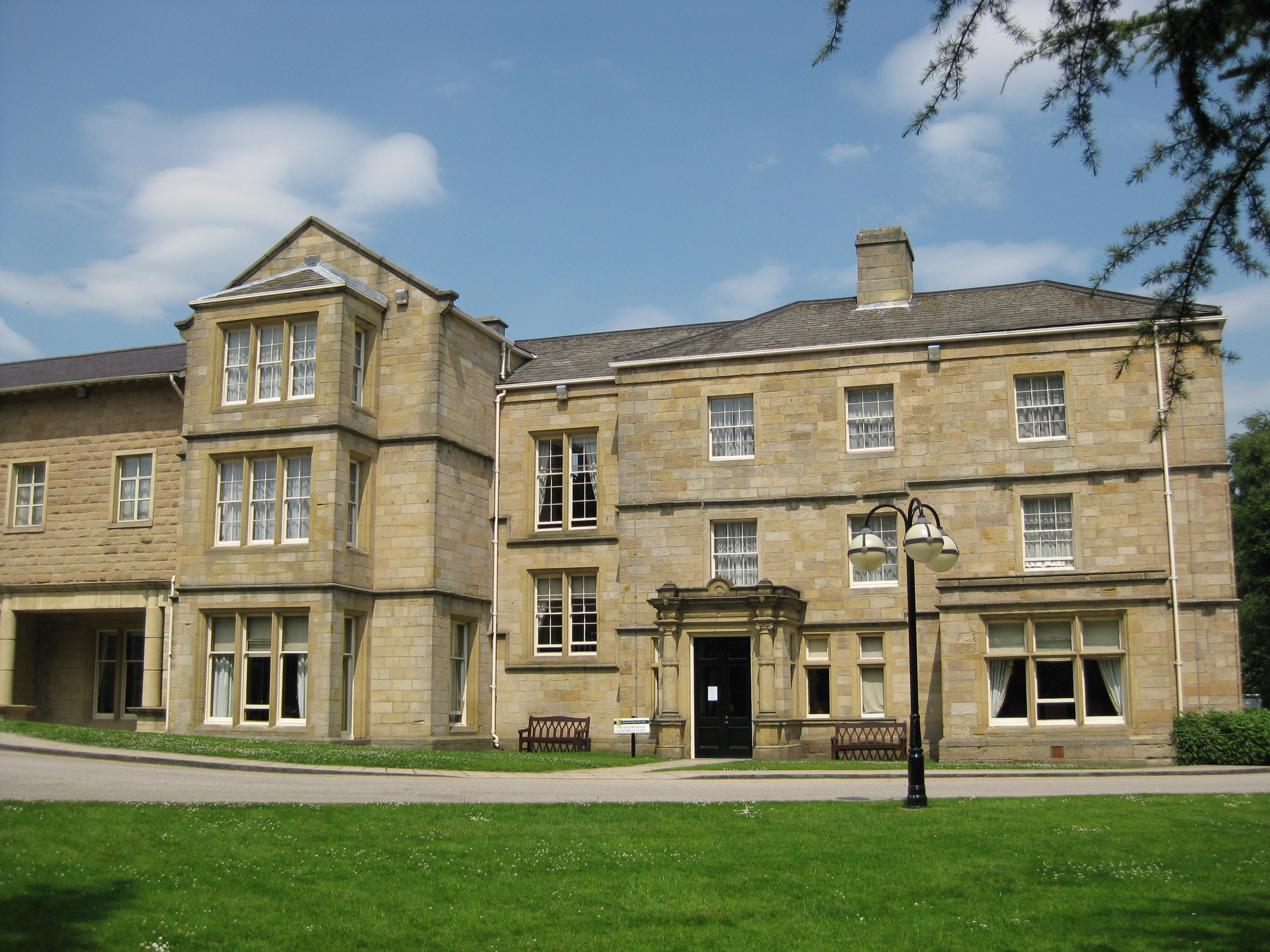
Weetwood Hall, the former University of Leeds hall of residence where Ingham was sub-warden

In the late 1920s, Ingham joined the Leeds University Amateurs, the university's amateur dramatics society, acting in several well-received roles, such as Sybil Bumont in The Watched Pot. In December 1928, she took part in a fashion show of dresses through the ages at the Albion Hall, Leeds, in aid of St Faith's Homes. She wore a high-waisted, skin-tight coat of red cloth edged with fur, a long blue skirt trimmed with six rows of black velvet, and a feather toque. Her appearance was greeted with "shrieks of laughter" from the audience.

They were ideally complementary, Jane as quick in thought and action as 'A. E.' was deliberate.

— John Charles Burkill, Dictionary of National Biography (1981)

She married Albert Ingham on 6 July 1932 at St Edward's Church, Cambridge, in a private ceremony attended only by her parents, sister Edith, brother-in-law Michael Sadleir, who gave her away, and Redman King. They had met after he had been appointed reader in mathematical analysis at the University of Leeds in 1926. (Note: Albert, whose hobby was mountaineering, flew from a holiday in Central Europe for the interview in Leeds.) Their engagement announcement in May 1932 had come as surprise to their circle of friends in Leeds, as there had been no indication that they were romantically involved. However, they had been quietly engaged with plans to announce it after lectures ended.

In July 1939, Albert was awarded a Leverhulme Research Fellowship to study analytic number theory at the Institute for Advanced Study (IAS) in Princeton, New Jersey. At that point, they had two sons, Michael Frank and Stephen Darell, (Note: In 1961, Michael was elected a Fellow of King's College, Cambridge, and later joined the staff of the University Observatory at Oxford.) and the entire family sailed from Liverpool to New York on 1 September 1939. However, just two days into their voyage, Britain declared war on Germany. They were hesitant to bring their family back due to reports from Europe containing speculation of imminent total war. Consequently, they made the decision to keep the family in Princeton, except for Albert, who had returned to England by 1942. Alan Pars, godfather to their son Michael, later recommended Albert for an Admiralty post in America knowing that Ingham and the children were still there.

== Later life and death ==
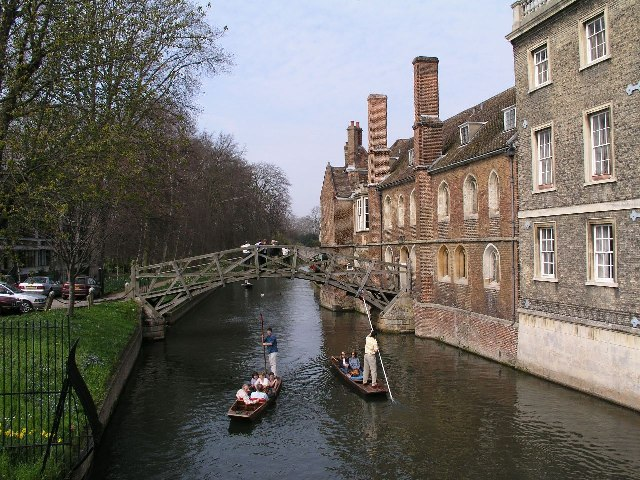
Punting on the River Cam in Cambridge.

The Inghams owned a punt, called Pete, moored in the River Cam, and it was used regularly during the summer for trips and picnics. They also went on many trips abroad, including India, and walking holidays in the French Alps. It was on such a holiday that Albert died of a heart attack on a high path near Haute-Savoie, south-eastern France. After his death, she resisted offers for her husband's mathematical notes and papers, instead keeping the papers in a cupboard at the house.

[She] was very wiry and fit ... [I have] an abiding memory of how fast and vigorously my grandmother would walk. She was always frustrated with my brother and I as we 'dawdled' fifty yards behind her. We just could not keep up with her furious pace.

— Dr Mark Ingham describing Jane Ingham, in Afterimages: Photographs as an External Autobiographical Memory System (2005), p. 46

Jane Ingham died at Cambridge on 10 September 1982, and was cremated at the Cambridge City Crematorium, Huntingdon Road, Dry Drayton, on 20 September 1982. Alan Pars, her friend and her husband's former colleague at Cambridge, sent a wreath.

== Legacy ==
=== Discovery of protein in plant cell walls ===
Ingham and Priestley were the first to isolate cell walls from the middle lamella of the radicle and plumule meristems of Vicia faba. They analysed the cell walls for protein, cellulose, and pectin. They noted that the cellulose walls of the radicle failed to react with iodine and sulphuric acid, or with chloriodide of zinc. (Note: Cells that have cellulose in their walls are stained blue by chloriodide of zinc, or a solution of iodine followed by sulphuric acid.) They showed that the cellulose in the wall of the radicle is masked by other substances, particularly proteins and fatty acids. In the plumule, cellulose is associated with greater quantities of pectin, but less protein and fatty acid, particularly when the adult parenchyma is grown in light.

Cell wall and middle lamella (top)

They concluded that the meristematic cells had walls containing a protein‑pectin complex, that is, these walls "... commencing as interfaces in a protein-containing medium may be regarded as composed at first mainly of protein." Florence Mary Wood, a British postdoctoral researcher in biochemistry at Birkbeck College, questioned their results and concluded that less than 0.001% of protein was found in the cell walls of the plants examined. Later researchers found protein in the cells but were unable to rule out the possibility of cytoplasmic contamination. It is now known that the middle lamella consists of a pectic polysaccharide-rich material. However, the material properties and molecular organisation of the middle lamella are still not fully understood.

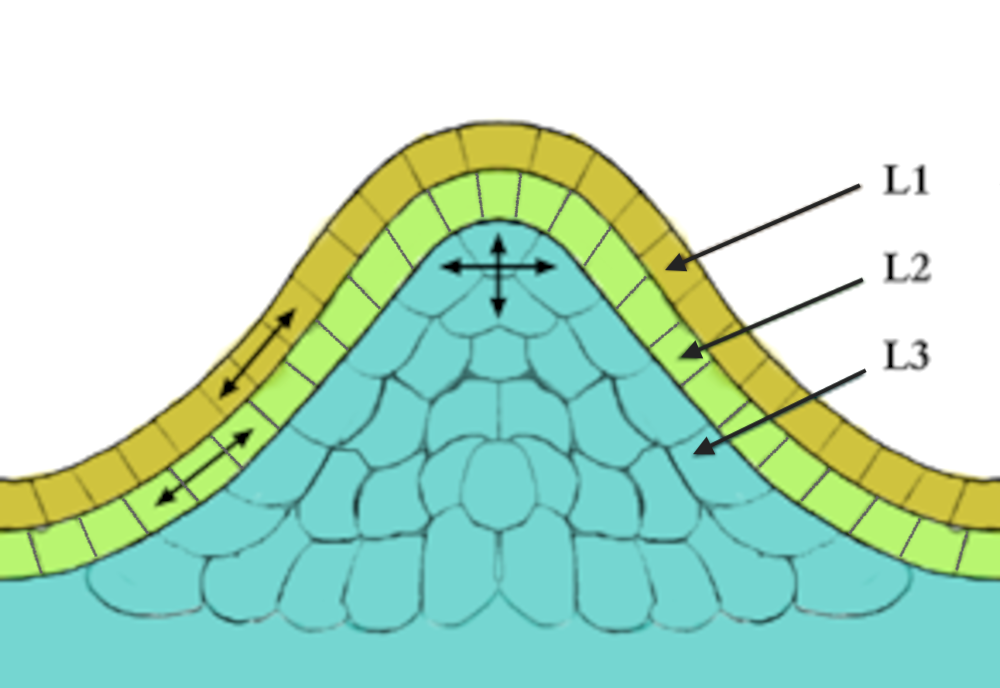
Tunica‑Corpus model of the apical meristem (growing tip). The epidermal (L1) and sub-epidermal (L2) layers form the outer layers called the tunica. The inner L3 layer is called the corpus.

=== Differences in cell division and elongation in the epidermal layer of plants ===
Ingham found that in the arch of the hypocotyl from sunflower seeds, Helianthus annuus, there are considerably more cells on the outside than on the inside. Counting from the beginning to the end of the arch, the result was "3,299 cells on the upper side as against 1,531 on the lower." This result means that the convex side of the arch leads the concave side, not only in terms of cell extension, but also in cell division behaviour, such that a different division rate would cause the growth difference. Consequently, the concave and convex sides show profound physiological differences. The observation that in the hypocotyl the cells on the convex side are considerably larger than those on the inside could be explained by the uneven transverse transport of the growth hormone auxin. Auxin has a strengthening effect on the elongation growth of the cells. In the case of nutation phenomena, it is possible that curvature only occurs in a narrowly limited section of the shoot.

Harald Kaldewey, professor of botany at Saarland University in Saarbrücken, Germany, measured the differences in the length of the sub-epidermal cells on the outer and inner periphery of the arch in the nutation curvature of the pedicels of snake's head fritillary, Fritillaria meleagris. The result was expected if the curvature is based exclusively on differences in elongation growth. A difference in width between the sub-epidermal cells of the outer and inner periphery of the arch of curvature was not found. Sir Edward James Salisbury, the English botanist and ecologist, found good agreement between the ratio of the epidermal cell lengths and the arch lengths of the nutation curvature of the epicotyl in seedlings of different woody plants. The findings of Ingham, Salisbury, and Kaldewey, do not necessarily contradict each other as the epidermis and sub-epidermal layer may well behave differently than cortical layers in terms of division and extension growth.

=== Importance of cell orientation in cork ===
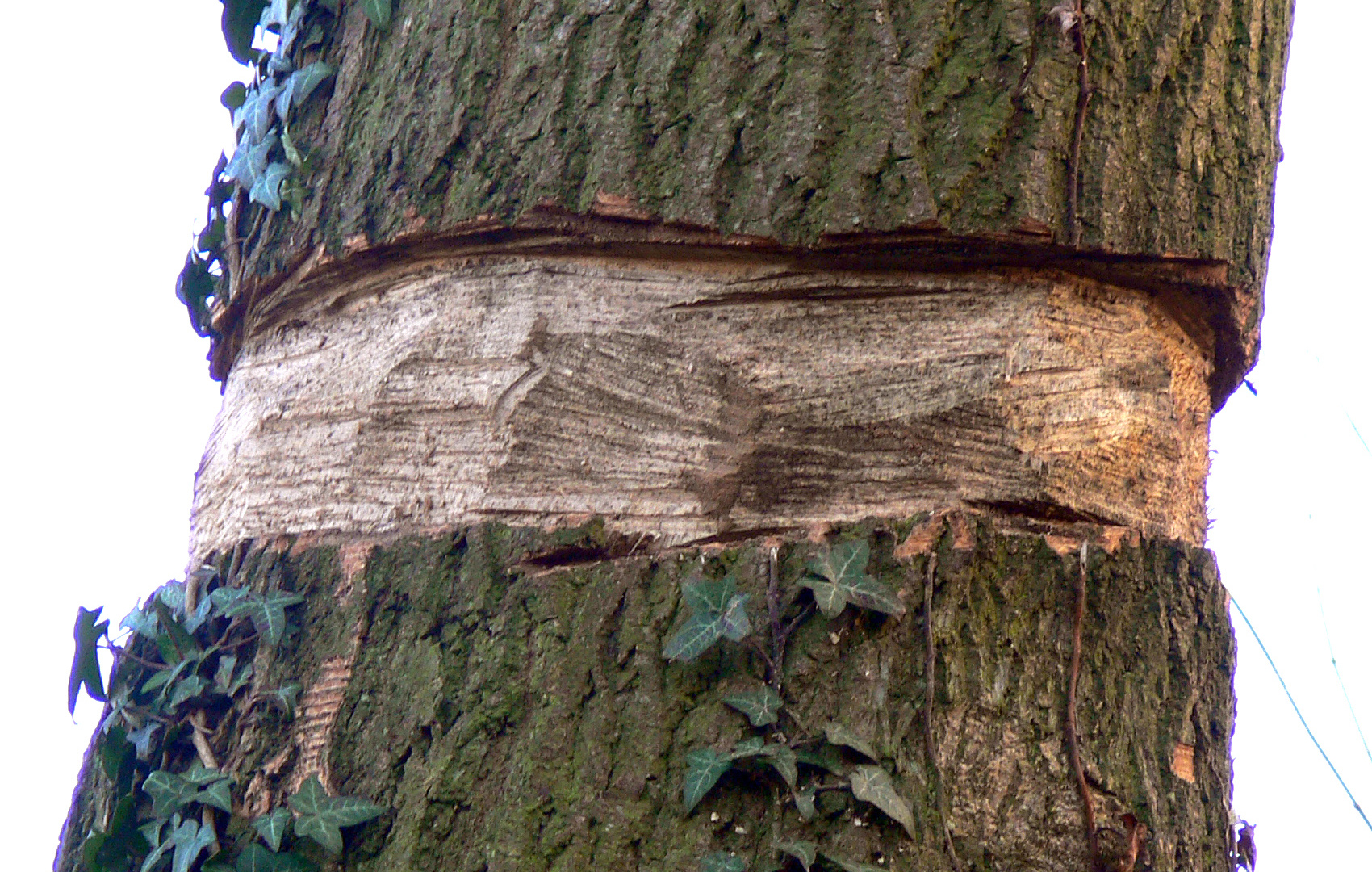
A tree that has been ring-barked

In Ingham's last study in the botany department at the University of Leeds, she ring-barked Laburnum and sycamore (Acer pseudoplatanus) trees, but left zigzag bridges of tissue with horizontal portions linking the bark above and below the cut. At first, the lack of pressure within these bridges resulted in the formation of callus-like tissue, and the cambial initials, by repeated division, came to resemble ray cells. At a later stage, some of this mass of isodiametric (roughly spherical) cells became elongated horizontally in the direction of the bridge tissue. Xylem and phloem formed in the horizontal portion of the bridge with its tracheary elements extended in a horizontal direction. It has been postulated that calluses are formed because the cambium cells cannot function correctly under a change of orientation. For example, the altered direction of sap flow might affect the direction of cambial cell growth. Pressure, nutrient movements, and cambial basipetal auxin transport have also been suggested as causes.

== Publications ==
=== As author ===
- Priestley, Joseph Hubert; Tupper-Carey, Rose Marie (7 November 1922). "Physiological Studies in Plant Anatomy IV. The Water Relations of the Plant Growing Point". New Phytologist. 21 (4). London: Wheldon & Wesley: 210–229. doi:10.1111/j.1469-8137.1922.tb07598.x. ISSN 0028-646X. JSTOR 2428025.
- Tupper-Carey, Rose Marie; Priestley, Joseph Hubert (2 July 1923). "The composition of the cell- wall at the apical meristem of stem and root". Proceedings of the Royal Society. Series B, Containing Papers of a Biological Character. 95 (665). London: Royal Society: 109–131. Bibcode:1923RSPSB..95..109T. doi:10.1098/rspb.1923.0026. ISSN 0950-1193. JSTOR 80874. "Communicated by Frederick Blackman. Received 25 April 1923." Refereed by William Lawrence Balls in May 1923.
- Tupper-Carey, Rose Marie; Priestley, Joseph Hubert (23 July 1924). "The Cell Wall in the Radicle of Vicia faba and the Shape of the Meristematic Cells". New Phytologist. 23 (3). London: Wheldon & Wesley: 156–159. doi:10.1111/j.1469-8137.1924.tb06630.x. ISSN 0028-646X. JSTOR 2427781.
- Tupper-Carey, Rose Marie (1928). Geotropism or Gravity and Growth (MSc). Leeds: University of Leeds. pp. 1–86. OCLC 1184171098. 30106005063069. "Ingham's MSc thesis."
- Tupper-Carey, Rose Marie (1928). "The Development of the Hypocotyl of Helianthus annuus considered in connection with its Geotropic Curvatures". Proceedings of the Leeds Philosophical and Literary Society. Science Section Part 2. 1925 to 1929 Parts 5 to 10. 1. Leeds: Leeds Philosophical and Literary Society: 361–368. ISSN 0024-0281. OCLC 848524378. "Communicated by Joseph Hubert Priestley. Received 4 December 1928."
- Tupper-Carey, Rose Marie (1930). "Observations on the anatomical changes in tissue bridges across rings through the phloem of trees". Proceedings of the Leeds Philosophical and Literary Society. Science Section Part 2. December 1929 to May 1934. 2. Leeds: Leeds Philosophical and Literary Society: 86–94. ISSN 0024-0281. OCLC 848524378. "Communicated by Joseph Hubert Priestley. Received 26 February 1930."

=== As experimental collaborator ===
- Pearsall, William Harold; Ewing, James (1 March 1927). "The Absorption of Water by Plant Tissue in Relation to External Hydrogen-Ion Concentration" (PDF). The Journal of Experimental Biology. 4 (3). London: 245–257. doi:10.1242/jeb.4.3.245. ISSN 0022-0949. Archived (PDF) from the original on 9 July 2020. "Ingham provided unpublished work on the swelling in buffer solutions of the air-dry, but living, embryos of broad bean seeds."
- Priestley, Joseph Hubert (31 July 1926). "Light and Growth II. On the Anatomy of Etiolated Plants". New Phytologist. 25 (3). London: Wheldon & Wesley: 145–170. doi:10.1111/j.1469-8137.1926.tb06688.x. ISSN 0028-646X. JSTOR 2427687.
- Priestley, Joseph Hubert; Swingle, Charles Fletcher (December 1929). Vegetative Propagation from the Standpoint of Plant Anatomy. Technical Bulletin 151. Washington: United States Department of Agriculture. pp. 1–98. hdl:2027/uiug.30112019336897. OCLC 784311303.
- Rhodes, Edgar; Woodman, Rowland Marcus (1925). "The Fatty Substances of the Plant Growing Point". Proceedings of the Leeds Philosophical and Literary Society. 1925 to 1929. 1. Leeds: Leeds Philosophical and Literary Society: 27–36. ISSN 0024-0281. OCLC 848524378. "Communicated by Professor Joseph Hubert Priestley. Received 21 October 1925."

== See also ==
- Albert Ingham
- Lyn Irvine
- Irene Manton
- Meristem
- Michael Sadleir
- Plant development
- Department of Plant Sciences, University of Cambridge
- University of Leeds
