= Rachel Ford Thompson =

English botanist and temperance activist (1856–1906)

- Born: 31 August 1856; York, North Yorkshire, England
- Died: 9 December 1906 (aged 50); Southport, Merseyside, England
- Occupations: Botanist; temperance activist
- Parent(s): Silvanus Thompson; Bridget Tatham
- Relatives: Silvanus P. Thompson (brother)

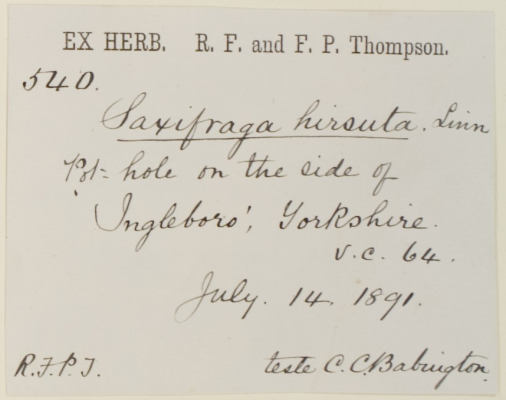
Rachel Ford Thompson's records

Rachel Ford Thompson (31 August 1856 – 9 December 1906) was an English botanist and temperance activist. She aided Frederick Janson Hanbury with his studies of Hieracium, and she contributed to F.A. Lees' Flora of West Yorkshire and Cardale Babington's Manual of British Botany, in which she developed "an entirely fresh account of the genus" Hieracium. Thompson was also an active member of the Women's Temperance Union. Her brother Sylvanus P. Thompson was a physics professor and electrical engineer.

== Life ==
Rachel Ford Thompson was born in York on 31 August 1856. She was the daughter of Quaker botanist Silvanus Thompson (1818–1881) and Bridget Tatham. Her father was the headteacher at the Quaker school in York.

Thompson was a botanist and temperance activist. From 1882 to 1893, she studied flora in Yorkshire. She aided Frederick Janson Hanbury with his studies of Hieracium. She contributed to F.A. Lees' Flora of West Yorkshire, and Cardale Babington's Manual of British Botany, in which she developed "an entirely fresh account of the genus" Hieracium.

She was also an active member of the Women's Temperance Union.

Thompson died in Southport at the age of 50, on 9 December 1906. Her brother Sylvanus P. Thompson was a physics professor and electrical engineer.

Research published in 2014 examining the networks of collaboration between botanists in the period 1856 to 1932 showed that Thompson was one of only eight women botanists to have links to more than ten other collectors. The other well-connected women botanists were Margaret Dawber (1859–1901), Frances Louisa Foord-Kelcey (1862–1914), Dorcas Martha Higgins (1856?–1920), Eliza Standerwick Gregory, Elizabeth Lomax, Charlotte Ellen Palmer (1830–1914), and Ida Mary Roper.
