= C. Brian Haselgrove =

English mathematician

Brian Haselgrove
- Born: 26 September 1926; Waltham Forest, London, England
- Died: 27 May 1964 (aged 37)
- Education: University of Cambridge
- Known for: Disproof of Pólya conjecture
- Awards: Smith's Prize (1950)
- Scientific career
- Thesis: Some theorems in the analytic theory of numbers (1956)
- Doctoral advisor: Albert Ingham

Colin Brian Haselgrove (26 September 1926 – 27 May 1964) was an English mathematician who is best known for his disproof of the Pólya conjecture in 1958.

Haselgrove was educated at Blundell's School and from there won a scholarship to King's College, Cambridge. He obtained his Ph.D., which was supervised by Albert Ingham, from Cambridge in 1956.

== Personal life ==
Haselgrove was married to fellow mathematician Jenifer Haselgrove. After having suffered minor epileptic fits for several years caused by a brain tumor, he died in Manchester in May 1964.
