= William Sanders (geologist) =

English geologist (1799–1875)

William Sanders (12 January 1799 – 12 November 1875) was an English merchant and geologist.

== Early life and career ==
Sanders was born in Bristol on 12 January 1799, and educated mainly at a school run by Thomas Exley. For a time Sanders and a brother were in partnership as corn merchants, but he retired from business to concentrate on scientific work. Later he helped develop the Bristol Museum, of which for many years he was honorary curator. He was the founding President of the Bristol Naturalists Society in May 1862 until his death in 1875.

== Works ==
A geological map of the Bristol Coalfield, on a scale of four inches to the mile, was Sanders's major work; it was begun in 1835 and finished in 1862, when it was published. It covered an area of 720 square miles, and was laid down from his own surveys. The preparatory topographical map was made under his care and at his own expense, by collating about one hundred parish maps on different scales.

Sanders wrote five papers, read to the British Association, and co-operated with John Phillips's survey of North Devon. He also published a pamphlet on the crystalline form of celestine from Pyle Hill, Bristol, and made a manuscript study of the railway cuttings on from Bath through Bristol to Taunton. He supplied evidence to the health of towns commission, 1844–5, and for a report to the General Board of Health (1850).

== Honours ==
He was elected Fellow of the Geological Society in 1839, and Fellow of the Royal Society in 1864.

== Personal life ==
On 12 November 1875, Sanders died unmarried.
