= Liouville function =

Arithmetic function

In number theory, the Liouville function, named after French mathematician Joseph Liouville and denoted $\lambda(n)$, is an important arithmetic function. Its value is $1$ if $n$ is the product of an even number of prime numbers, and $-1$ if it is the product of an odd number of prime numbers.

== Definition ==
By the fundamental theorem of arithmetic, any positive integer $n$ can be represented uniquely as a product of powers of primes:

$$n=p_1^{a_1}\cdots p_k^{a_k}$$,

where $p_1,\dots,p_k$ are primes and the exponents $a_1,\dots,a_k$ are positive integers. The prime omega function $\Omega(n)$ counts the number of primes in the factorization of $n$ with multiplicity:

$$\Omega(n) = a_1 + a_2 + \cdots + a_k$$.

Thus, the Liouville function is defined by

$$\lambda(n) = (-1)^{\Omega(n)}$$

(sequence A008836 in the OEIS).

== Properties ==
Since $\Omega(n)$ is completely additive; i.e., $\Omega(ab)=\Omega(a)+\Omega(b)$, then $\lambda(n)$ is completely multiplicative. Since $1$ has no prime factors, $\Omega(1)=0$, so $\lambda(1)=1$.

$\lambda(n)$ is also related to the Möbius function $\mu(n)$: if we write $n$ as $n=a^2b$, where $b$ is squarefree, then

$$\lambda(n) = \mu(b).$$

The sum of the Liouville function over the divisors of $n$ is the characteristic function of the squares:

$$\sum_{d|n}\lambda(d) =
\begin{cases}
1 & \text{if }n\text{ is a perfect square,} \\
0 & \text{otherwise.}
\end{cases}$$

Möbius inversion of this formula yields

$$\lambda(n) = \sum_{d^2|n} \mu\left(\frac{n}{d^2}\right).$$

The Dirichlet inverse of the Liouville function is the absolute value of the Möbius function, $\lambda^{-1}(n)=|\mu(n)|=\mu^2(n)$, the characteristic function of the squarefree integers.

== Series ==
The Dirichlet series for the Liouville function is related to the Riemann zeta function by

$$\frac{\zeta(2s)}{\zeta(s)} = \sum_{n=1}^\infty \frac{\lambda(n)}{n^s}.$$

Also:

$$\sum\limits_{n=1}^{\infty} \frac{\lambda(n)\ln n}{n}=-\zeta(2)=-\frac{\pi^2}{6}.$$

The Lambert series for the Liouville function is

$$\sum_{n=1}^\infty \frac{\lambda(n)q^n}{1-q^n} =
\sum_{n=1}^\infty q^{n^2} =
\frac{1}{2}\left(\vartheta_3(q)-1\right),$$

where $\vartheta_3(q)$ is the Jacobi theta function.

== Conjectures on weighted summatory functions ==
Summatory Liouville function L(n) up to n = 10^{4}. The readily visible oscillations are due to the first non-trivial zero of the Riemann zeta function.

Summatory Liouville function L(n) up to n = 10^{7}. Note the apparent scale invariance of the oscillations.

Logarithmic graph of the negative of the summatory Liouville function L(n) up to n = 2 × 10^{9}. The green spike shows the function itself (not its negative) in the narrow region where the Pólya conjecture fails; the blue curve shows the oscillatory contribution of the first Riemann zero.

Harmonic Summatory Liouville function T(n) up to n = 10^{3}

The Pólya problem is a question raised made by George Pólya in 1919. Defining

$L(n) = \sum_{k=1}^n \lambda(k)$ (sequence A002819 in the OEIS),

the problem asks whether L(n) ≤ 0 for all n > 1. The answer turns out to be no. The smallest counter-example is n = 906150257, found by Minoru Tanaka in 1980. It has since been shown that L(n) > 0.0618672√n for infinitely many positive integers n, while it can also be shown via the same methods that L(n) < −1.3892783√n for infinitely many positive integers n.

For any $\varepsilon > 0$, assuming the Riemann hypothesis, we have that the summatory function $L(x) \equiv L_0(x)$ is bounded by

$$L(x) = O\left(\sqrt{x} \exp\left(C \cdot \log^{1/2}(x) \left(\log\log x\right)^{5/2+\varepsilon}\right)\right),$$

where the $C > 0$ is some absolute limiting constant.

Define the related sum

$$T(n) = \sum_{k=1}^n \frac{\lambda(k)}{k}.$$

It was open for some time whether T(n) ≥ 0 for sufficiently big n ≥ n_{0} (this conjecture is occasionally—though incorrectly—attributed to Pál Turán). This was then disproved by Haselgrove (1958), who showed that T(n) takes negative values infinitely often. A confirmation of this positivity conjecture would have led to a proof of the Riemann hypothesis, as was shown by Pál Turán.

=== Generalizations ===
More generally, we can consider the weighted summatory functions over the Liouville function defined for any $\alpha \in \mathbb{R}$ as follows for positive integers x where (as above) we have the special cases $L(x) := L_0(x)$ and $T(x) = L_1(x)$

$$L_{\alpha}(x) := \sum_{n \leq x} \frac{\lambda(n)}{n^{\alpha}}.$$

These $\alpha^{-1}$-weighted summatory functions are related to the Mertens function, or weighted summatory functions of the Möbius function. In fact, we have that the so-termed non-weighted, or ordinary, function $L(x)$ precisely corresponds to the sum

$$L(x) = \sum_{d^2 \leq x} M\left(\frac{x}{d^2}\right) = \sum_{d^2 \leq x} \sum_{n \leq \frac{x}{d^2}} \mu(n).$$

Moreover, these functions satisfy similar bounding asymptotic relations. For example, whenever $0 \leq \alpha \leq \frac{1}{2}$, we see that there exists an absolute constant $C_{\alpha} > 0$ such that

$$L_{\alpha}(x) = O\left(x^{1-\alpha}\exp\left(-C_{\alpha} \frac{(\log x)^{3/5}}{(\log\log x)^{1/5}}\right)\right).$$

By an application of Perron's formula, or equivalently by a key (inverse) Mellin transform, we have that

$$\frac{\zeta(2\alpha+2s)}{\zeta(\alpha+s)} = s \cdot \int_1^{\infty} \frac{L_{\alpha}(x)}{x^{s+1}} dx,$$

which then can be inverted via the inverse transform to show that for $x > 1$, $T \geq 1$ and $0 \leq \alpha < \frac{1}{2}$

$$L_{\alpha}(x) = \frac{1}{2\pi\imath} \int_{\sigma_0-\imath T}^{\sigma_0+\imath T} \frac{\zeta(2\alpha+2s)}{\zeta(\alpha+s)}
\cdot \frac{x^s}{s} ds + E_{\alpha}(x) + R_{\alpha}(x, T),$$

where we can take $\sigma_0 := 1-\alpha+1 / \log(x)$, and with the remainder terms defined such that $E_{\alpha}(x) = O(x^{-\alpha})$ and $R_{\alpha}(x, T) \rightarrow 0$ as $T \rightarrow \infty$.

In particular, if we assume that the Riemann hypothesis (RH) is true and that all of the non-trivial zeros, denoted by $\rho = \frac{1}{2} + \imath\gamma$, of the Riemann zeta function are simple, then for any $0 \leq \alpha < \frac{1}{2}$ and $x \geq 1$ there exists an infinite sequence of $\{T_v\}_{v \geq 1}$ which satisfies that $v \leq T_v \leq v+1$ for all v such that

$$L_{\alpha}(x) = \frac{x^{1/2-\alpha}}{(1-2\alpha) \zeta(1/2)} + \sum_{|\gamma| < T_v} \frac{\zeta(2\rho)}{\zeta^{\prime}(\rho)} \cdot
\frac{x^{\rho-\alpha}}{(\rho-\alpha)} + E_{\alpha}(x) + R_{\alpha}(x, T_v) + I_{\alpha}(x),$$

where for any increasingly small $0 < \varepsilon < \frac{1}{2}-\alpha$ we define

$$I_{\alpha}(x) := \frac{1}{2\pi\imath \cdot x^{\alpha}} \int_{\varepsilon+\alpha-\imath\infty}^{\varepsilon+\alpha+\imath\infty}
\frac{\zeta(2s)}{\zeta(s)} \cdot \frac{x^s}{(s-\alpha)} ds,$$

and where the remainder term

$$R_{\alpha}(x, T) \ll x^{-\alpha} + \frac{x^{1-\alpha} \log(x)}{T} + \frac{x^{1-\alpha}}{T^{1-\varepsilon} \log(x)},$$

which of course tends to 0 as $T \rightarrow \infty$. These exact analytic formula expansions again share similar properties to those corresponding to the weighted Mertens function cases. Additionally, since $\zeta(1/2) < 0$ we have another similarity in the form of $L_{\alpha}(x)$ to $M(x)$ insomuch as the dominant leading term in the previous formulas predicts a negative bias in the values of these functions over the positive natural numbers x.
