= Christopher Hooley =

British mathematician (1928–2018)

- Born: 7 August 1928
- Died: 13 December 2018 (aged 90)
- Education: University of Cambridge
- Awards: Adams Prize (1972); Senior Berwick Prize (1980)
- Scientific career
- Workplaces: Cardiff University
- Doctoral advisor: Albert Ingham

Christopher Hooley FRS FLSW (7 August 1928 – 13 December 2018) was a British mathematician and professor of mathematics at Cardiff University.

He did his PhD under the supervision of Albert Ingham. He won the Adams Prize of Cambridge University in 1973. He was elected a Fellow of the Royal Society in 1983. He was also a Founding Fellow of the Learned Society of Wales.

He showed that the Hasse principle holds for non-singular cubic forms in at least nine variables.
