= Bristol Naturalists' Society =

- Logo of the Bristol Naturalists' Society
- Abbreviation: BNS
- Formation: 1862
- Type: Non-Governmental Organisation
- Legal status: Charity
- Purpose: Natural History: Education, Research, Conservation
- Location: Bristol, England
- President: Ray Barnett
- Chairman: Giles Morris
- Key people: Margaret Fay, Membership Secretary
- Website: Bristol Naturalists' Society

The Bristol Naturalists' Society is an organisation whose objectives include the promotion of the study of natural history, particularly that of the Bristol area, and the conservation of the fauna, flora, and geological sites of Britain. It was founded in 1862 and celebrated its 150th anniversary in 2012.

== Early history ==
The Bristol Naturalists' Society was established on 8 May 1862. The purpose of the organisation was to promote natural science through a schedule of regular meetings during which scientific subjects would be addressed and associated items could be exhibited. Other goals have included the amassing of a library of books connected to the natural sciences, as well as the publication of the Proceedings of the society. Monthly meetings of the general membership were initially held from October to May at University College, Bristol, the predecessor to the University of Bristol. The society has maintained close ties to the University of Bristol and the Bristol City Museum and Art Gallery throughout its history. During the society's general meetings, lectures are given, usually by members. At least one excursion is undertaken each summer. In addition to general membership, members can opt to join one or more of the specialised sections of the association: Botanical, Entomological, and Geological. The sections hold meetings as well. Sections in Chemistry and Ornithology were added later in the nineteenth century. The Library of the Bristol Naturalists' Society was initially in its rooms at the Literary and Philosophic Club at 20 Berkeley Square, now the University and Literary Club (Unilit). In addition to books and periodicals, the library contains other valuable works. The Proceedings of the society are published annually, now under the title Nature in Avon.

Previous presidents of the Bristol Naturalists' Society have included many notable members of the Bristol community. The first president of the organisation was the geologist William Sanders (1799–1875). He held the office of president from 1862 to 1875. Professor Conwy Lloyd Morgan (1852–1936) of University College, Bristol, later the University of Bristol, was another eminent member of the community who served as president of the society. Morgan was also elected to the presidency of the Clifton Antiquarian Club. The first female president of the Bristol Naturalists' Society was Ida Roper, who was elected to that office in 1913. Roper was also a member of the Clifton Antiquarian Club, contributing papers to the sixth and seventh volumes of the Proceedings of the Clifton Antiquarian Club. Other notable members of the Bristol Naturalists' Society have included three Fellows of the Entomological Society of London: Alfred Edmund Hudd, who was first appointed to the Council of the society in 1875, Stephen Barton (d. 1898), and George C. Griffiths (1852–1924). A notable female member was bryologist Agnes Fry.

== Recent history ==
In 1972, the association became a charity. On 29 June 2010, the membership of the Bristol Naturalists' Society approved their constitution at the annual general meeting. The constitution adopted indicated that the objectives of the society were "the promotion of education and research into natural history including geology with special reference to the Bristol district" and "the promotion of the conservation of the British fauna and flora and the protection of geological and physiographical sites." Current specialised sections of the club include Botany, Geology, Invertebrate, Mammal, and Ornithology. The Library of the Bristol Naturalists' Society is located at the Bristol City Museum and Art Gallery on Queens Road. Lectures held in 2012 include two hosted by the Botanical section: "Salisbury Plain" by Sharon Pilkington in February, and "Plants of the Drawdown Zone" by Dr. Camilla Lambrick in March.

The Bristol Naturalists' Society celebrated its 150th anniversary in 2012. Events held by the society to mark the anniversary included a photographic exhibition, "Natural History Photographs of the Region," on 14 April 2012 at Bradbury Hall in Henleaze, Bristol. In addition, an anniversary dinner was held on 8 May 2012 at the Freemasons' Hall in Bristol. The University of Bristol Botanic Garden also celebrated the society's anniversary. Their special event, "A Celebration and Illustration of Bristol Flora, New Paintings and Rare Plants of the West Country," was held on 2–5 June 2012.

== Publications ==
The Society produces a newsletter — The Bulletin for its members, outlining the various talks and walks in the coming month, or so. This is sent out 10 times/year and is edited by David Davies. A continuing feature of the Society had been the production of printed Proceedings. These continue to this day, with the 2013 volume, issued in 2014, being a themed edition, on the subject of 'The Downs'. This was produced under the editorship of Richard Bland. The Society also produces, jointly with the Bristol Ornithological Club, the annual Avon Bird Report. The Society publishes an annual journal, 'Nature in Avon'. Digital copies of more recent editions of Nature in Avon are available from the free online Biodiversity Heritage Library.
