= Armenag K. Bedevian =

Armenag Kevorg Bedevian, Effendi, from Armenian descent, author of Illustrated Polyglottic Dictionary of Plant Names, in Latin, Arabic, Armenian, English, French, German, Italian and Turkish Languages, 1936 (with 1711 illustrations), was Director of Gizeh Research Farm, Egypt

According to W. Lawrence Balls, M.A., Sc.D., F.R.S., in the book's preface, "Mr. Bedevian joined me as agricultural assistant at the old Cotton Field Laboratory in 1913 and when I returned to Egypt in 1927 I found him fairly established in the Ministry of Agriculture as Manager of the Giza Experimental Farm, and also Superintendent of the Cotton Seed Control operations, I found that he was not only in possession of masses of data about the farm, about the ginneries, merchants, and the like, but that he could produce summaries, abstracts, and graphs of that information at short notice in reply to any question I might ask about such things. Thus it was evident that he had a flair for order and system".
