= Pólya conjecture =

Disproven conjecture in number theory

Summatory Liouville function L(n) up to n = 10^{7}. The (disproven) conjecture states that this function is always negative. The readily visible oscillations are due to the first non-trivial zero of the Riemann zeta function.

Closeup of the summatory Liouville function L(n) in the region where the Pólya conjecture fails to hold.

Logarithmic graph of the negative of the summatory Liouville function L(n) up to n = 2 × 10^{9}. The green spike shows the function itself (not its negative) in the narrow region where the conjecture fails; the blue curve shows the oscillatory contribution of the first Riemann zero.

In number theory, the Pólya conjecture (or Pólya's conjecture) stated that "most" (i.e., 50% or more) of the natural numbers less than any given number have an odd number of prime factors. The conjecture was set forth by the Hungarian mathematician George Pólya in 1919, and proven false in 1958 by C. Brian Haselgrove. Though mathematicians typically refer to this statement as the Pólya conjecture, Pólya never actually conjectured that the statement was true; rather, he showed that the truth of the statement would imply the Riemann hypothesis. For this reason, it is more accurately called "Pólya's problem".

The size of the smallest counterexample is often used to demonstrate the fact that a conjecture can be true for many cases and still fail to hold in general, providing an illustration of the strong law of small numbers.

== Statement ==
The Pólya conjecture states that for any $n>1$, if the natural numbers less than or equal to $n$ (excluding 0) are partitioned into those with an odd number of prime factors and those with an even number of prime factors, then the former set has at least as many members as the latter set. Repeated prime factors are counted repeatedly; for instance, we say that 18 = 2 × 3 × 3 has an odd number of prime factors, while 60 = 2 × 2 × 3 × 5 has an even number of prime factors.

Equivalently, it can be stated in terms of the summatory Liouville function, with the conjecture being that

$$L(n) = \sum_{k=1}^n \lambda(k) \leq 0$$

for all $n>1$. Here, $\lambda(k)=(-1)^{\Omega(k)}$, where $\Omega(k)$ counts the total number of prime factors of $k$. Thus $\lambda(k)$ is positive if the number of prime factors of $k$ is even, and is negative if it is odd.

== Disproof ==
The Pólya conjecture was disproven by C. Brian Haselgrove in 1958. He showed that the conjecture has a counterexample, which he estimated to be around 1.845 × 10^{361}.

A (much smaller) explicit counterexample, of n = 906,180,359 was given by R. Sherman Lehman in 1960; the smallest counterexample is n = 906,150,257, found by Minoru Tanaka in 1980.

The conjecture fails to hold for most values of n in the region of 906,150,257 ≤ n ≤ 906,488,079. In this region, the summatory Liouville function reaches a maximum value of 829 at n = 906,316,571.

Peter Humphries showed that

$\liminf_{n\to\infty}\dfrac{L(n)}{\sqrt{n}}\le -1.389278414\cdots,\quad \limsup_{n\to\infty}\dfrac{L(n)}{\sqrt{n}}\ge 0.061867262\cdots.$ (Note: See Humphries, Theorem 2.3.)

He also showed that assuming certain hypotheses including the Riemann hypothesis, the set of numbers $n$ such that $L(n)>0$ has logarithm density $0<\delta\le\dfrac{1}{2}$. (Note: See Humphries, Theorem 1.5.) A heuristic argument suggests that this set has logarithm density of around 0.00012. (Note: See Humphries, Section 7, p. 28.)
