= Elizabeth Lomax =

English botanist (1810–1895)

Elizabeth Anne Lomax (22 February 1810 – 16 March 1895) was a British botanist whose herbarium is kept in Manchester.

Research published in 2014 examining the networks of collaboration between botanists in the period 1856 to 1932 showed that Lomax was one of only eight women botanists to have links to more than ten other collectors. The other well-connected women botanists were Margaret Dawber (1859–1901), Frances Louisa Foord-Kelcey (1862–1914), Dorcas Martha Higgins (1856?–1920), Eliza Standerwick Gregory, Rachel Ford Thompson, Charlotte Ellen Palmer (1830–1914), and Ida Mary Roper.
