= Albert Ingham =

English mathematician

Albert Ingham FRS
- Born: Albert Edward Ingham; 3 April 1900; Northampton, Northamptonshire, England
- Died: 6 September 1967 (aged 67); Switzerland
- Education: Trinity College, Cambridge
- Spouse: Rose Marie Tupper-Carey (m. 1932)
- Awards: Smith's Prize (1921); Fellow of the Royal Society
- Scientific career
- Workplaces: King's College, Cambridge
- Doctoral students: Wolfgang Fuchs; C. Haselgrove; Christopher Hooley; Robert Rankin

Notes
- Erdős Number: 1

Albert Edward Ingham FRS (3 April 1900 – 6 September 1967) was an English mathematician.

== Early life and education ==
Ingham was born in Northampton. He went to King Edward VI Grammar School in Stafford and began his studies at Trinity College, Cambridge in January 1919 after service in the British Army in World War I. Ingham received a distinction as a Wrangler in the Mathematical Tripos at Cambridge. He was elected a fellow of Trinity in 1922. He also received an 1851 Research Fellowship.

== Academic career ==
Ingham was appointed a reader at the University of Leeds in 1926 and returned to Cambridge as a fellow of King's College and lecturer in 1930. Ingham was appointed after the death of Frank Ramsey.

Ingham supervised the PhDs of C. Brian Haselgrove, Wolfgang Fuchs and Christopher Hooley.

Ingham proved in 1937 that if

$$\zeta\left(1/2+it\right)=O\left(t^c\right)$$

for some positive constant c, then

$$\pi\left(x+x^\theta\right)-\pi(x)\sim\frac{x^\theta}{\log x},$$

for any θ > (1+4c)/(2+4c). Here ζ denotes the Riemann zeta function and π the prime-counting function.

Using the best published value for c at the time, an immediate consequence of his result was that

g_{n} < p_{n}^{5/8},

where p_{n} the n-th prime number and g_{n} = p_{n+1} − p_{n} denotes the n-th prime gap.

Ingham retired from teaching in 1959.

== Honours ==
Ingham was elected a Fellow of the Royal Society (FRS) in 1945.

== Marriage and children ==
Ingham married Rose Marie "Jane" Tupper‑Carey in 1932. They had two sons.

== Death ==
Ingham died in Switzerland in 1967, aged 67.

== Publications ==
Ingham's sole book, On the Distribution of Prime Numbers, was published in 1932.
