= Thomas Exley =

English schoolmaster and schoolkeeper

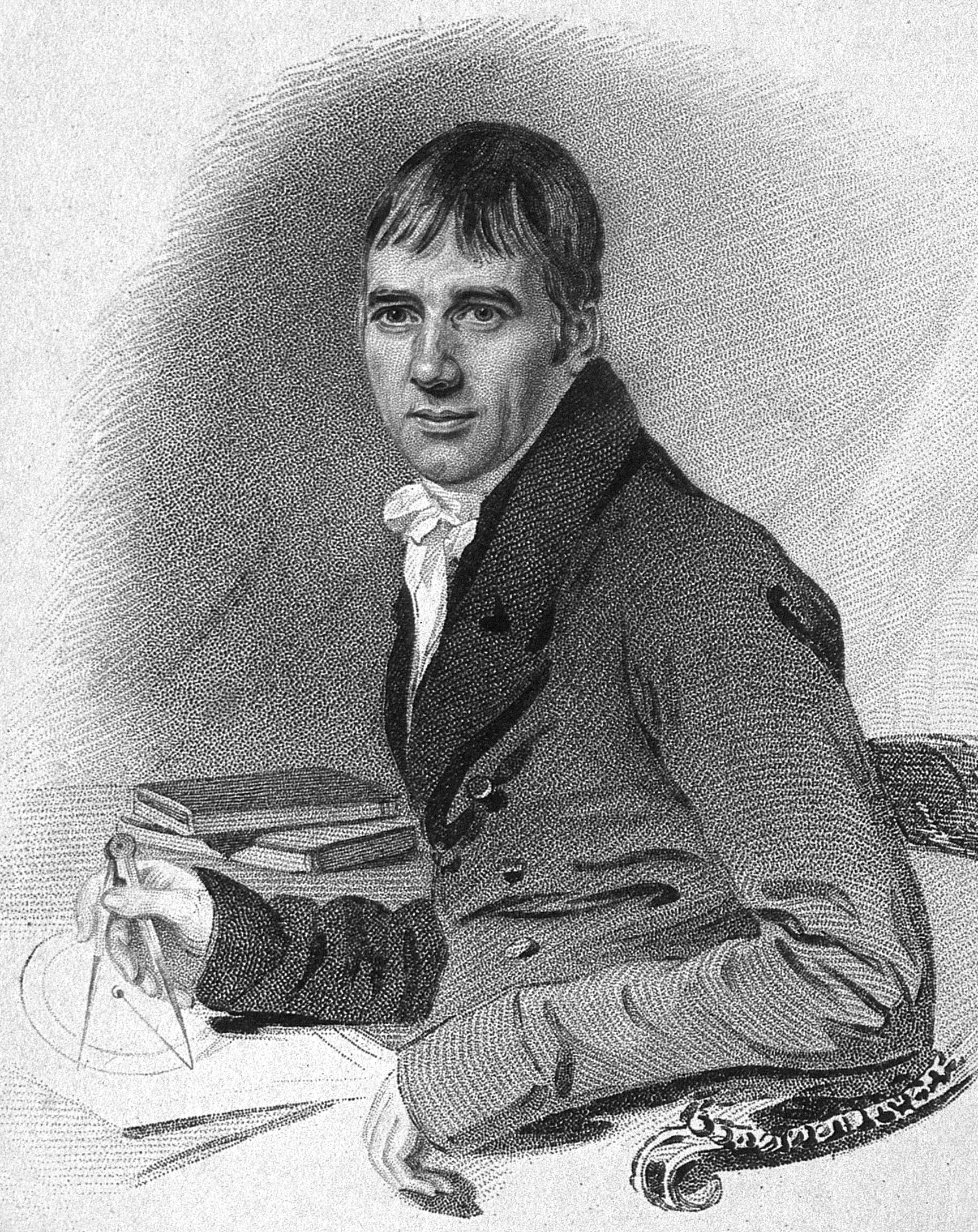
Thomas Exley in 1819

Thomas Exley (9 December 1774 – 17 February 1855) was an English schoolmaster and schoolkeeper, who taught and occasionally published on mathematics, but was better known for advancing controversial scientific theories and for theological discussions, with special reference to Methodism.

Exley was born in Gowdall, a village one mile west of Snaith, Yorkshire. He settled at Bristol in the last week of 1799, quickly resuming work teaching mathematics. In 1812 he brought out with the Rev. William Moore Johnson, then curate of Henbury, Gloucestershire, a compilation entitled The Imperial Encyclopædia; or, Dictionary of the Sciences and Arts; comprehending also the whole circle of Miscellaneous Literature, &c., 4 vols. 4to, London [1812]; the following year, on 6 January 1813, he was awarded an honorary MA degree from King's College, Aberdeen, on the nomination of Johnson and their mutual brother-in-law Dr. Adam Clarke, both Johnson and Clarke already holding honorary degrees from Aberdeen. By 1848 Exley had given up keeping school and retired to Cotham Park Road, Bristol. He was an early member of the British Association for the Advancement of Science, and read several papers at its meetings.

The Imperial Magazine; or Compendium of Religious, Moral & Philosophical Knowledge carried a profile of Exley in the sixth issue of its first volume in 1819. Exley was then only forty-four, but the final paragraph observes that, the life of a retired mathematician can hardly be expected to furnish any extensive variety. He died on 17 February 1855, aged 80.

== Mathematical activities ==
Exley showed an early taste for mathematics. He was a pupil at a classical and mathematical school near Barnard Castle, North Yorkshire and then moved to Manchester in search of further study and employment, finding both in a recently opened classical school. This was also his entry to the Clarke family, as, in 1796, he married Hannah Clarke, a daughter of the schoolkeeper and sister of Dr. Clarke. Exley opened his own school in Huddersfield, but, despite its success, ill health obliged him to move again, which is how he came to settle in Bristol. His reputation was assured there when, in 1802, he solved some challenging questions that appeared in a local paper.

Exley has not left much in the way of mathematical legacy, but work on the extraction of cube roots did attract favourable attention. He published his method in the entry on arithmetic in The Imperial Encyclopædia and returned to the subject in a note in The Imperial Magazine in 1819. His friend and associate W. G. Horner remarks on this contribution in his more celebrated paper on root extraction presented to the Royal Society of London that year. Exley and Horner were examiners at Kingswood School, then in Bristol: Exley for mathematics; Horner for classics.

== Selected works ==
- A Vindication of Dr. Adam Clarke, in answer to Mr. Moore's Thoughts on the Eternal Sonship of the Second Person of the Holy Trinity, addressed to the People called Methodists, &c., 8vo, Bristol [1817].
- Reply to Mr. Watson's Remarks on the Eternal Sonship of Christ; and the Use of Reason in matters of Revelation. Suggested by several passages in Dr. Adam Clarke's Commentary on the New Testament. To which are added Remarks on Mr. Boyd's Letters on the same subject in the Methodist Magazine, 8vo, London, 1818.
- The Theory of Parallel Lines perfected; or, the twelfth axiom of Euclid's Elements demonstrated, 8vo, London, 1818.
- A new, easy, and very concise rule for extracting the cube root of numbers, Imperial Magazine, 1 (1819), No. 5, Cols. 404–413.
- Principles of Natural Philosophy; or, a new Theory of Physics, founded on Gravitation, and applied in explaining the General Properties of Matter, &c., 8vo, London, 1829.
- Physical Optics; or, the Phenomena of Optics explained according to Mechanical Science, and on the known Principles of Gravitation, 8vo, London, 1834.
- A Commentary on the First Chapter of Genesis: in which an attempt is made to present that Beautiful and Orderly Narrative in its true light. To which are added a Short Treatise on Geology, showing that the facts asserted by Moses … corroborate Geological Facts, … a short treatise on the Deluge, &c., 8vo, London, 1844. In the preface the author states that "this work is not a mushroom notion just sprung up; indeed for more than forty years it has occupied my thoughts".

== John Thompson Exley ==
A son, John Thompson Exley (1815—1899), from Thomas Exley's second marriage, matriculated at St. John's College, Cambridge in 1834 and stood twenty-third Wrangler in the Mathematical Tripos in 1838. He taught at the short-lived Bristol College, being styled Vice-Principal in the period 1840—1841, just before the College failed. Thereafter he kept a substantial boys' school in Bristol on Cotham Road. On his death, the substantial library built up by the Exleys, father and son, passed to the fledgling University College and today forms the core of the Exley Collection at the University of Bristol. An item of special personal interest in the collection is John Exley's manuscript notebook on mathematics from his undergraduate years.

== Sources ==
- (unsigned) Memoir of Mr. Thomas Exley, A. M. of Bristol. (With a Portrait), Imperial Magazine, 1 (1819), No. 6, Cols. 577–584.

This article incorporates text from a publication now in the public domain: "Exley, Thomas". Dictionary of National Biography. London: Smith, Elder & Co. 1885–1900.
