= Paul E. A. Barbier =

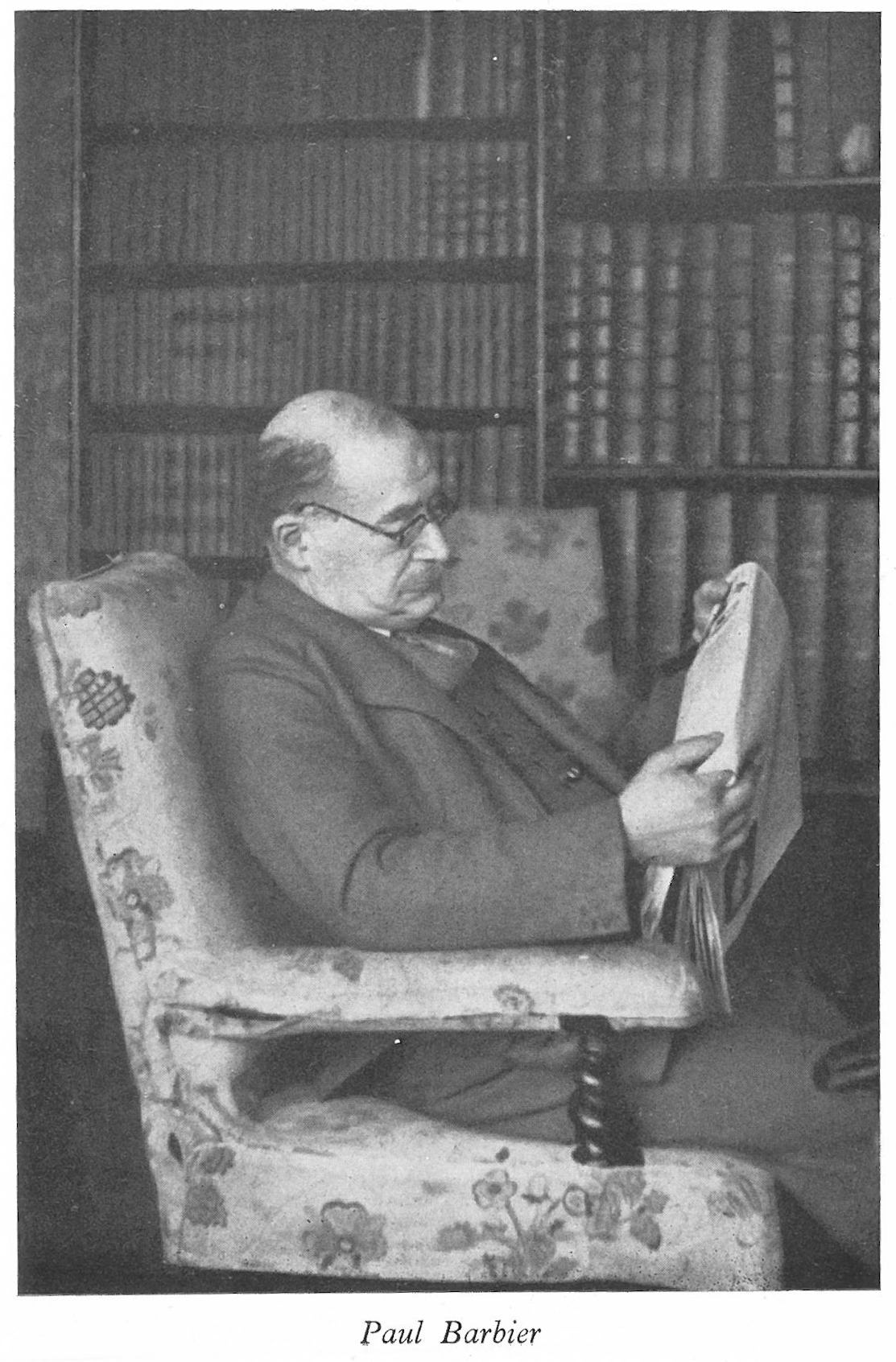
Professor Paul Barbier, 1873–1947

Paul Emile Auguste Barbier (1873–1947) was Professor of French at the University of Leeds 1903–38; he is noted for his work on French lexicography and his promotion of Celtic Studies.

== Early and family life ==
Paul E. A. Barbier's paternal grandfather, Georges Barbier, was a French Protestant pastor. Georges's son, Paul Eugene Emile Barbier (1846–1921), was born in France, in the Doubs Valley. In 1862, Georges migrated to London, becoming pastor of the French Protestant Church in Soho Square, taking his family with him. Georges took in Swiss women who were training as governesses; after a ten-year acquaintance, one of them, the Protestant French-Swiss Euphémie Bornet (1847–1923), married Paul E. E. Barbier in 1872. The two had eight children, including Paul E. A. Barbier.

At the time of Paul E. A. Barbier's birth, his father taught French at Manchester Grammar School while his mother ran a private school for young children called Aubonne House School for Ladies. In 1883, Paul E. E. Barbier became Professor of French at University College, Cardiff, and the family moved there. Thus as a child Paul E. A. Barbier acquired English, French, and Welsh as native languages; he also studied Latin and Ancient Greek, and acquired some knowledge of Italian and German.

After school, Paul E. A. Barbier took an MA in French and Welsh at University College, Cardiff (awarded by London University), which involved some study at the University of Paris. Like his brothers, he undertook compulsory French military service.

Around 1906, Barbier married Cecile Ernestine Delaloye. Their children were Paul G. R. Barbier (1908–72), Marie C. C. Barbier (1909–2000), Cecile E. Barbier (1910–1995), and Albert F. Barbier (1912–?); in the account of his friend and colleague William P. Milne, 'Barbier had all the Frenchman's traditional genius for filling the rôle of the paterfamilias'.

== Career ==
Paul E. A. Barbier and two of his siblings, Edmond and Isabelle, during the First World War.

Notwithstanding his parents' hopes that he would enter diplomatic service, in 1898 Barbier became a French teacher at Gainsborough Grammar School, and the following year lecturer in French at the Yorkshire College in Leeds. The Yorkshire College became the University of Leeds in 1904. He took up residence in Otley; indeed, 'those of his colleagues who were privileged to partake of his hospitality in his home and to share in the pregnant converse that flowed continuously from his lips called him the Sage of Otley'. In 1903 he was promoted to Professor of French, though his working conditions were unprepossessing: J. R. R. Tolkien characterised the office which Barbier shared with George S. Gordon, the professor of English, in the early 1920s as 'a box of glazed bricks, mainly furnished with hot water pipes'. Barbier went on to hold 'most of the principal public offices in the university', including Dean of Arts, Dean of Commerce, member of Council, and Pro-Vice-Chancellor, though in Milne's assessment 'administrative duties though bravely carried out rather irked him. They consumed time that could have been more profitably employed on philological research'. Barbier's work as Chairman of the Library Committee was particularly noted, and he had a significant influence on the acquisition of medieval French manuscripts by the university.

The First World War saw Barbier serving as an English interpreter for the French army. He remained in correspondence with his colleagues at Leeds; indeed, in 1915 the Vice Chancellor even attempted, unsuccessfully, to convince the French authorities to allow Barbier to return to his Leeds duties. Barbier's wife Cecile, meanwhile, was part of a Leeds committee for sending gifts and parcels to University employees serving in France.

Barbier was best known for his lexicographical research, reading widely in search of interesting words and useful citations (including during meetings of the University Senate). He alleviated the tedium of war service with lexicographical research on the dialect of his new environs, Erquinghem-Lys. In 1921 he published a pamphlet on 'English Influence on the French Vocabulary' followed from 1925 by a series of 28 articles under the title 'miscellanea lexicographica' in the Literary and Historical Section of the Proceedings of the Leeds Philosophical and Literary Society. On his death left a vast, unpublished dictionary of French, the manuscripts of which are held by Leeds University Library's special collections.

Barbier was an important member of the university's Polyglot Society, and in 1928 a founder of the Yorkshire Society for Celtic Studies, which aspired to endow a lectureship and degree in Celtic at the University of Leeds. In his commitment to encouraging Celtic Studies, Barbier followed in his father's footsteps; already in 1897 he had addressed the Eisteddfod on 'The Age of Owain Gwynedd'. When in 1925 J. R. R. Tolkien left Leeds for Oxford halfway through delivering a two-year course on Middle Welsh, Barbier completed the supervision of the course's sole student, Brian Woledge.

Barbier retired in 1938, becoming professor emeritus in that year.

== Honours ==
In 1939 Barbier was awarded an honorary LL.D. degree from the University of Edinburgh and created knight of the French Légion d'Honneur. Two years later, Leeds awarded him an honorary Litt.D. degree.

== Bibliography ==
- T. V. Benn, Bibliographie des travaux de Paul Barbier (1873-1947) (Leeds: Brotherton Library et Département de Français, Université de Leeds, 1983)

== Archives ==
- Personal notes, diaries and correspondence in Cardiff University Archives, GB 1239 463/7.
- List of manuscripts in the Brotherton Library, University of Leeds.
