= Eliza Standerwick Gregory =

British botanist (1840–1932)

- Born: 6 December 1840; Thrapston, Northamptonshire
- Died: 22 March 1932 (aged 91); Weston-super-Mare
- Known for: violets

Eliza Standerwick Gregory or Eliza Standerwick Barnes (6 December 1840 – 22 March 1932) was a British botanist.

== Life ==
Eliza Standerwick Barnes was born in Thrapston in Northamptonshire in 1840. She was always interested in botany but she did not become a published botanist until she was older at the age of 64. Her special knowledge was of violets and she published a monograph in 1912. Her botanical abbreviation is from her married name and is "Greg." She published several times in the Journal of Botany.

Gregory is credited with the discovery of the Cornish fumitory, Fumaria occidentalis. She reported that she found it on the edge of a wood at Lelant.

Gregory died in Weston-super-Mare. Her herbarium is in the Natural History Museum. It includes samples from southern England and from Northern Ireland.

Research published in 2014 examining the networks of collaboration between botanists in the period 1856 to 1932 showed that Thompson was one of only eight women botanists to have links to more than ten other collectors. The other well-connected women botanists were Margaret Dawber (1859–1901), Frances Louisa Foord-Kelcey (1862–1914), Dorcas Martha Higgins (1856?–1920), Rachel Ford Thompson, Elizabeth Lomax, Charlotte Ellen Palmer (1830–1914), and Ida Mary Roper.
