= Ida Mary Roper =

British botanist and author (1865–1935)

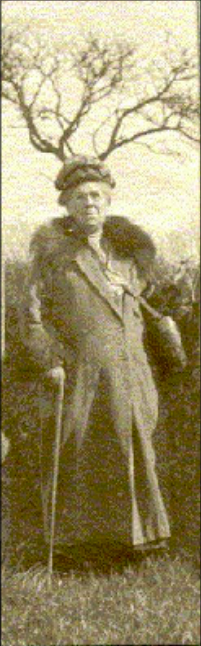
- Ida on a Botanical Ramble, 15 July 1933
- Born: Ida Mary Roper; 25 August 1865; Westbury, Bristol, United Kingdom
- Died: 8 June 1935 (aged 69)
- Resting place: Arno's Vale Cemetery, Bristol, United Kingdom
- Spouse: None
- Scientific career
- Fields: Botany

Ida Mary Roper (25 August 1865 – 8 June 1935) was a British botanist and antiquary. She was the first female president of the Bristol Naturalist Society.

== Early life ==
Ida was born to John, a pharmacist, and Lucy Roper in Westbury, Bristol, United Kingdom. She had a brother, Harold Roper, and two half-brothers named Frank and Ernest Samson, who were a product of Lucy's previous marriage. She attended Clifton High School, beginning in 1879.

== Career ==
Roper began her herbarium in 1893, and continued adding to it until 1934. Her main areas of interest were Pteridophytes and Spermatophytes, of which Frank would often collect specimens. Acting as her associate, Frank Samson became her legal guardian and aided in Roper's research. Frank was known to be an active supporter in all of Roper's work.

Roper was also interested in mosses and ferns, as well as Orchidaceae and Violaceae families. In 1908, the Bristol Naturalists Society published her first paper, titled "The Blossoming of the Trees," and she soon became a fellow of the Linnean Society. In 1913, Roper was elected President of the Bristol Naturalists Society, a position that had never been held by a woman.

Roper aided James Walter White, another botanist, in compiling a Flora of Bristol, which was published in 1912. White acknowledged Roper for her "trustworthy and energetic help...for fieldwork...and assistance in literary research and in revision and correction of the press." After her death, Roper's herbarium was bequeathed to the University of Leeds.

=== Publications and notable finds ===
- The Monumental Effigies of Gloucestershire and Bristol (1931)
- Nitella mucronata var. gracillina
  - Discovered growing in a pond in Wickwar, West Gloucestershire in 1917
  - The most western recording of the species in England

Research published in 2014 examining the networks of collaboration between botanists in the period 1856 to 1932 showed that Roper was one of only eight women botanists to have links to more than ten other collectors. The other well-connected women botanists were Margaret Dawber (1859–1901), Frances Louisa Foord-Kelcey (1862–1914), Dorcas Martha Higgins (1856?–1920), Eliza Standerwick Gregory, Elizabeth Lomax, Charlotte Ellen Palmer (1830–1914), and Rachel Ford Thompson.

A poster noting significant female botanists in England and Ireland from the 19th and 20th centuries.

== Personal life ==
As a child Roper moved often with her family. This movement indicates that the Ropers were upper middle class, based on the postal codes of the areas they moved to. In addition, the Roper's had a servant within the household and employed four men in the family business.

Other than botany, Roper held interests in archaeology / art history, and had a book published on monumental effigies. She became the first woman to be elected to the Council of the Bristol and Gloucestershire Archaeological Society

Roper was never married. She died on 8 June 1935 in a nursing home after falling ill, and is buried with her family at Arnos Vale Cemetery in Bristol.
