= Adriance S. Foster =

American botanist (1901–1973)

Adriance Sherwood Foster (1901–1973) was an American botanist known for his studies of plant anatomy. The first plant anatomist at the University of California, Berkeley, he was a two-time recipient of a Guggenheim Fellowship and served as president of the Botanical Society of America and the International Society of Plant Morphologists. His textbooks Practical Plant Anatomy and Comparative Morphology of Vascular Plants were widely adopted and influential. Foster was born in Poughkeepsie, New York, August 6, 1901, and earned a B.S. at Cornell in 1923, followed by a master's (1925) and doctorate (1926) at Harvard under Irving W. Bailey. After earning his doctorate he spent two years in England working at the University of Leeds, and from 1928 to 1934 was professor of botany at the University of Oklahoma. He joined the U.C. Berkeley faculty in 1934, retiring as professor emeritus in 1968. Foster died on May 1, 1973, from complications of spinal osteomyelitis.

The standard author abbreviation A.S.Foster is used to indicate this person as the author when citing a botanical name.
