= William Pearsall =

British botanist (1891–1964)

Professor William Pearsall
- Born: William Harold Pearsall; 23 July 1891; Stourbridge, England
- Died: 14 October 1964 (aged 73)
- Known for: Quain Professor
- Awards: Fellow of the Royal Society (1940); Linnean Medal (1963)
- Scientific career
- Fields: Botany
- Institutions: University College London

William Harold Pearsall FRS FLS FIBiol (23 July 1891 – 14 October 1964) was a British botanist, Quain Professor of Botany at University College London 1944–1957.

== Awards and honours ==
Pearsall was elected a Fellow of the Royal Society in 1940. His nomination reads:

Distinguished for his researches on the ecology of aquatic vegetation, his investigations on growth and nitrogen metabolism, and his contributions on general ecology. His elucidation of the factors determining the distribution of aquatic plants in the British lakes is fundamental and has markedly promoted research in freshwater biology. His study of the conditions affecting growth and development of Algae open up a little-touched field. As Honorary Director of the Laboratory at Wray Castle he played a very considerable part in stimulating the rapid development of the research-programme. He has for a number of years edited the 'Yorkshire Naturalist'.
