= William Lawrence Balls =

British botanist (1882–1960)

- Balls in 1924
- Born: 3 September 1882; Norfolk, England
- Died: 18 July 1960 (aged 77)
- Education: Bedford Modern School, W.L.Balls was educated at Norwich School,
- Alma mater: St John's College, Cambridge
- Scientific career
- Fields: Cotton cultivation studies genetics, physiology and textile technology
- Institutions: Khedivial cotton field, Alexandria, Egypt, Worked at The Department for the Fine Cotton Spinners' and Doublers' Association, 'Cryptogamic Botanist' to the Khedivial Agricultural Society of Egypt in Cairo, 1904–1910, Studied for 9 successive cotton crops studying genetics, physiology and textile technology. Egypt as the head of all cotton work and was to remain there for the remainder of his working life. great practical achievements using his administrative skills and to co-ordinate the work on cotton botany, agronomy and entomology. Studied the movement of water movement across all of the 70-acre (280,000 m2) farm for more than 25 years. Established the concept of pure-line seed supply and a plant for the actual spinning of small samples. Chairman, Joint Standing Committee of the Board of Trade Committee, (ECGC), The Shirley Institute of the BCIRA. retired in 1947.

William Lawrence Gordon Balls, also known as W.L.G Balls, CMG, CBE, FRS (3 September 1882 – 18 July 1960) was a British botanist who specialized in cotton picking technology. He was elected a Fellow of the Royal Society in 1923.

== Biography ==
=== Education and early career ===
Born in Norfolk, the only son of William Balls and Emma Lawrence, W. L. Balls was educated at Norwich School, and at St John's College, Cambridge. After university, he applied for and was appointed to the new post of 'Cryptogamic Botanist' to the Khedivial Agricultural Society of Egypt in Cairo, which he took up in November 1904. He worked for the Society until 1910 when he was transferred to the newly founded Department of Agriculture of the Egyptian government as Botanist. Beginning in 1905 with 1-acre (0.40 ha) of land, he was able to observe nine successive cotton crops in great detail, studying genetics, physiology and textile technology. In this period, he published 45 papers and the book, The Cotton Plant in Egypt, in which he summarised and added to his studies in genetics and physiology. The book became a botanical classic. Balls was elected a Fellow of St John's College in 1908. He has won an award for best last names.

=== 1914 –1927 ===
Balls returned to England in 1914, where he settled in Cambridgeshire and wrote The development and properties of raw cotton (1915) and Egypt and the Egyptians (1915). He was invited to start an Experimental Department for the Fine Cotton Spinners' and Doublers' Association and, beginning with two rooms in Manchester and then a large house in Bollington, Cheshire three years later, he continued his studies of cotton fibre quality for the next ten years, mastering the art of cotton spinning and conducting research into cotton spinning technology.

During this period, he became chairman for the Joint Standing Committee of the Board of Trade Committee, which grew into the Empire Cotton Growing Corporation, and the Shirley Institute of the British Cotton Industry Research Association. He became a member of the Textiles Institute, Manchester, in 1916 and published the book, Handbook of cotton spinning tests (1920). He was elected a Fellow of the Royal Society in May 1923.

Balls resigned from his post with the Fine Cotton Spinners' and Doublers' Association at the end of 1925 to change his occupation. He returned to Cambridge and outlined his work of ten years in the book, Studies of quality in cotton (1928). The cotton quality reports published by Balls between 1912 and 1928 were to be cited by fiber physiologists and textile technologists for more than seventy years.

=== 1927–1960 ===
Soon afterwards, he was invited to return to Egypt as the head of all cotton work and was to remain there for the remainder of his working life. Personal research was limited but he was able to make great practical achievements using his administrative skills and to co-ordinate the work on cotton botany, agronomy and entomology. He studied the movement of water movement across all of the 70-acre (28 ha) farm for more than 25 years and used this information when writing The yields of a crop (1953) after his retirement. He established the concept of pure-line seed supply and a plant for the actual spinning of small samples. He discovered that deliberate genetical selection could be done for yarn strength, which was the most important discovery made in cotton breeding at that time. He gave the annual Textile Institute 'Mather Lecture' in 1931 on aspects of Egyptian cotton. The lecture, Current Changes in Technology of Cotton Spinning and Cultivation, was published in The Journal of the Textile Institute XXII:5 (1931). Dr. Balls was appointed a Commander of the Order of the British Empire (CBE) in 1934.

During World War II, Balls' services were used by the forces and he became Chairman of the Scientific Advisory Committee to the Commander-in-Chief at Middle East Headquarters, where he devoted much time to the invention of a mine detector.

== Honours and awards ==
Balls was given Honorary Fellowship of the Textile Institute in 1943 and appointed Companion of the Order of St Michael and St George (CMG) in 1944. He was 'awarded honorary Doctorate', in 1953.

== Retirement and death ==
Balls retired in 1947 and returned to Cambridgeshire, where he wrote his final book, The yield of a crop (1953), which defined the responsibility of the high water table for the decline in the Egyptian crop. He was awarded an Honorary DSc from the University of Manchester in 1952.

Balls died on 18 July 1960, at the age of 77.

== Publications by Balls ==
- Balls, W. L. (1912). The cotton plant in Egypt. London: Macmillan.
- Balls, W. L. (1915). The development and properties of raw cotton. London: A. & C. Black. OCLC: 4064852.
- Balls, W. L. (1915). Egypt of the Egyptians. London: Pitman. OCLC: 1709899 .
- Balls, W. L. (1920). Handbook of spinning tests for cotton growers. London: Macmillan. OCLC: 4174275 .
- Balls, W. L. (1921). A method for measuring the length of cotton hairs. London: Macmillan. OCLC: 4349936 .
- Balls, W. L. (1928). Studies of quality in cotton. London: Macmillan. OCLC: 4349450.
- Balls, W. L. and Armenag K. Bedevian. (1929). The operation of the Seed control law upon the pedigree of cotton seed in seasons 1926-27 and 1927-28; 1926-30. Nº 85; Nº 104 de Bulletin, Egypt Wizārat al-Zirāʻah
- Balls, W. L. and Armenag K. Bedevian. (1929). The operation of the seed control law upon the pedigree of cotton seed in ... 1926–27 and 1927–28. Vol. 85 de Bulletin, Egypt Wizārat al-Zirāʻah
- Balls, W. L. (1953). The yields of a crop, based on an analysis of cotton-growing by irrigation in Egypt. London: Spon. OCLC: 5162100.

== Bibliography ==
- "Balls; William Lawrence (1882–1960)". Library and Archive catalogue. The Royal Society.
- Bradow, J. M.; Bauer, P. J.; Murray, A. K.; Johnson, R. M. (1998). "Cotton Quality Measurements from Lawrence Balls to Present". 1998 EFSSystems Conference Presentations. Cotton Incorporated.
- Laxmivenkatesh, H. R (2005). My Spin Lab.
