= Sexey =

Sexey may refer to:

- Charles E. Sexey (1818–1888), English trader, merchant adventurer and gold rush pioneer
- Hugh Sexey (1556–1619), Royal auditor of the Exchequer to Queen Elizabeth I of England
- Sexey-aux-Forges, commune in the Meurthe-et-Moselle department in northeastern France
- Sexey-les-Bois, commune in the Meurthe-et-Moselle department in northeastern France
- Sexey's Hospital in Bruton, Somerset, England was built c. 1630 as almshouses
- Sexey's School, state boarding school in Bruton, Somerset, England

== See also ==
- Sexy (disambiguation)
