= Ernest Charles Large =

English mycologist and plant pathologist

- Born: 24 June 1902
- Died: 25 August 1976
- Education: Battersea Polytechnic Institute, Chelsea College of Arts
- Occupations: Writer, mycologist, phytopathologist
- Employer: Seale-Hayne College

Ernest Charles Large OBE (24 June 1902, Parsons Green, London Borough of Hammersmith and Fulham – 25 August 1976) was an English engineer, novelist, mycologist, and phytopathologist, known as a pioneer of phytopathometry. For the academic year 1960–1961 he was the president of the British Mycological Society.

== Biography ==
After education at Clark's College in Putney, London and then at St Paul's School, London, he became in 1919 an apprentice at the engineering firm Gwynnes Pumps in Hammersmith, London. In the same year he became an evening student at Battersea Polytechnic Institute in London (which eventually became the University of Surrey) and graduated there in 1924 with a B.Sc. in engineering. For the four years following his graduation, he worked as a daytime engineer and studied at Battersea Polytechnic as an evening student of electrical engineering. At Battersea Polytechnic, he earned money as a demonstrator to evening classes in mechanical engineering.

In 1928 Large was appointed to a research position working on coal and its products in South Wales. With the onset of the Great Depression, he became unemployed a year and a half later and attempted to earn money by writing. In 1930 in Kingston upon Thames, Surrey, he married Gladys May Unwin (1903–1987). In 1930 E. C. Large became an engineer (and later a manager) in the Colloidal Section of Einstein's Electro-Chemical Processes Ltd. at Acton, Middlesex. There he worked under Emil Hatscheck (1868–1944). Hatschek developed a practical and inexpensive colloidal copper fungicide marketed under the trade name of Bouisol. From 1930 to 1945, Large was closely associated with the use of Bouisol and gradually became an expert in mycology and phytopathology. In the 1930s he was developed a dry bentonite-copper-oxychloride fungicide, usable for dusting or spraying plants. In 1936, Boots Pure Drug Company Ltd purchased the Colloidal Products Section and, after working for a time as a consultant for his new employer, Large became unemployed.

In 1936 Large turned to writing and his wife supported the family by continuing as a teacher. Jonathan Cape published Large's first novel Sugar in the Air in 1937 and his second novel Asleep in the Aftemoon in 1938. Sugar in the Air is considered one of the most noteworthy science fiction novels published in the 1930s. The New Yorker praised Asleep in the Afternoon in a brief mention. His third (and final) novel Dawn in Andromeda was published in 1956. The three novels received favorable reviews. E. C. Large became a minor literary celebrity and once had tea with Eric Blair aka George Orwell and Blair's first wife Eileen.

From 1936 to 1940 Large attended evening classes at Chelsea Polytechnic (which later became the Chelsea College of Arts). Eventually he became a Fellow of the Royal Institute of Chemistry. In 1940 Jonathan Cape published Large's The Advance of the Fungi, a history of phytopathology, which was much esteemed by phytopathologists, as well as general readers. In 1941 he became employed as an assistant to A. Beaumont, of Seale-Hayne Agricultural College in Devonshire. Beaumont, an employee of the Ministry of Agriculture and Fisheries, was the Advisory Mycologist for South-West England and from 1929 to 1939 did research on potato blight.

Soon after arriving at Seale-Hayne Agricultural College, Large published his first paper on potato blight. Over the next two decades, he gained an international reputation for this research on potato blight, photopathometry, and quantitative modelling of the effectiveness of the spraying of crops with fungicidal chemicals. Large found that time-based plots of the progression of potato blight, in terms of the percentage of plants destroyed, generally have a sigmoid, or S-based, form. There is relatively slow progress of the blight's attack at the beginning when there are relatively few fungal spores to spread infection and relatively slow progress at the end of the blight's attack when only a small percentage of potato plants remain available to be infected. This type of Verhulst logistic growth curve was previously used by S. B. Fracker to describe infection of American forests by the rust fungus Cronartium ribicola.

In 1946, the newly established National Agricultural Advisory Service transferred Large from the University of Seale-Hayne to the Agricultural School, Cambridge to work under William A. R. Dillon-Weston. At Cambridge, Large extended his knowledge of crop diseases beyond potato blight.

In 1950 Large was brought to the Plant Pathology Laboratory, Harpenden, by Walter Cecil Moore (1900–1967), who had been appointed director in 1949. Large was assigned by Moore to replace qualitative recording of plant diseases by quantitative methods of recording. Large demonstrated how progression curves for potato blight provide estimated of probable loss of crop yield and also showed how to estimate the likelihood that anti-fungal chemicals might destroy the stems of the plants treated with the chemicals. Assisted by the Agricultural Branch of the Meteorological Office, he developed effective methods of making regional forecasts in England and Wales for the dates during which potato blight outbreaks are likely to occur. At Harpenden, Large also did research in phytopathometry for choke (Epichloeh typhina) in cocksfoot seed crops, eelworm damage in clover, Verticillium wilt in alfalfa, and common scab (Streptomyces species) in potatoes. His 1954 paper Growth stages in cereals has over 2100 citations and "was for many years one of the most quoted papers in biological science".

He retired in 1963 from the Ministry of Agriculture and was awarded the Order of the British Empire (O.B.E.).

W. P. K. Findlay's 1967 book Wayside and Woodland Fungi contains 59 colour illustrations of fungi by Beatrix Potter, 28 by Reginald Ben Davis, and 20 by E. C. Large. Findlay's earlier books Wayside Advance of Fungi (1940) and Woodland Fungi (1965) also contains reproductions of Large's paintings.

E. C. Large and his wife had three children, Michael, Patrick, and Joanna. E. C. Large's daughter, Joanna Major, recalled her father's concern about verisimilitude when writing about new discoveries such as Stone Age kindling of fire. Her father and his family unsuccessfully experimented in making a fire without matches and then visited the Science Museum in London to learn how Stone Age people accomplished the task.

The 2008 book God's amateur: the writing of E.C. Large gives evaluations of Large's fiction, an account of his life, a comprehensive bibliography of his published writings, and a selection of his reportage, musings, travel essays, and book reviews.

== Selected publications ==
=== Articles ===
- Large, E. C. (1943). "Control of Potato Blight (Phytophthora infestans) by Spraying with Suspensions of Metallic Copper". Nature. 151 (3820): 80–81. Bibcode:1943Natur.151...80L. doi:10.1038/151080b0. S2CID 4118538.
- —— (1945). "Field trials of copper fungicides for the control of potato blight I. Foliage protection and yield". Annals of Applied Biology. 32 (4): 319–329. doi:10.1111/j.1744-7348.1945.tb06263.x.
- ——; Dillon-Weston, W. A. R. (1951). "Ear distortion in barley and other cereals caused by spraying with MCPA and 2, 4-D". The Journal of Agricultural Science. 41 (4): 338–349. doi:10.1017/S0021859600049522. S2CID 86202377.
- —— (1952). "The Interpretation of Progress Curves for Potato Blight and Other Plant Diseases". Plant Pathology. 1 (4): 109–117. Bibcode:1952PPath...1..109L. doi:10.1111/j.1365-3059.1952.tb00044.x.
- —— (1953). "Some Recent Developments in Fungus Disease Survey Work in England and Wales". Annals of Applied Biology. 40 (3): 594–599. doi:10.1111/j.1744-7348.1953.tb02397.x.
- —— (1954). "Growth stages in cereals. Illustration of the Feekes scale". Plant Pathology. 3 (4): 128–129. Bibcode:1954PPath...3..128L. doi:10.1111/j.1365-3059.1954.tb00716.x. abstract
- —— (1954). "Surveys for Choke (Epichloe Typhina) in Cocksfoot Seed Crops, 1951?53". Plant Pathology. 3 (1): 6–11. Bibcode:1954PPath...3....6L. doi:10.1111/j.1365-3059.1954.tb00674.x.
- —— (1955). "Methods of Plant-Disease Measurement and Forecasting in Great Britain". Annals of Applied Biology. 42: 344–354. doi:10.1111/j.1744-7348.1955.tb02439.x.
- ——; Honey, June K. (1955). "Survey of Common Scab of Potatoes in Great Britain, 1952 and 1953". Plant Pathology. 4 (1): 1–8. Bibcode:1955PPath...4....1L. doi:10.1111/j.1365-3059.1955.tb00723.x.
- —— (1961). "Disease losses in potatoes". Proceedings of the Nutrition Society. 20 (1): 15–20. doi:10.1079/PNS19610006. PMID 13759097. S2CID 222398879.
- —— (1966). "Measuring Plant Disease". Annual Review of Phytopathology. 4 (1): 9–26. Bibcode:1966AnRvP...4....9L. doi:10.1146/annurev.py.04.090166.000301.

=== Non-fiction books ===
- Large, E. C. (1940). The Advance of the Fungi. London: J. Cape. LCCN 41011950. abstract
  - Large, E. C. (2003). Advance of the fungi. St. Paul, Minnesota: American Phytopathological Society; with a new introduction by Karen-Beth G. Scholthof, Paul D. Peterson, and Clay S. Griffith
- Cox, A. E.; Large, E. C. (1960). Potato Blight Epidemics Throughout the World. Agricultural Handbook No. 174. Washington, D.C.: Agricultural Research Service, U.S. Department of Agriculture.

=== Novels ===
- Large, E. C. (1937). Sugar in the air, a romance. London: Jonathan Cape.
  - Large, E. C. (15 November 2008). Sugar in the Air. Hyphen Press. ISBN 9780907259367.
- Large, E. C. (1938). Asleep in the afternoon; a novel. London: Jonathan Cape; 413 pages
  - Large, E. C. (1939). Asleep in the afternoon; a novel. New York: H. Holt and Company.
  - Asleep in the Afternoon. Hyphen Press. 15 November 2008. ISBN 9780907259374.
- Large, E. C. (1956). Dawn in Andromeda. London: Jonathan Cape. ASIN B001KS10I2; 282 pages
