= Joan Moore =

Joanna, Joanne, Jo or Joan Moore may refer to:

- Joanna P. Moore (1832–1916), American Baptist missionary
- Joan Moore (phytopathologist) Moore (1920–1986), English plant pathologist, science administrator and conservationist
- Joanna Moore (1934–1997), American film and TV actress
- Joan Moore (gymnast) (born 1954), American Olympian in 1972, US Champion
- Jo Moore (born 1963), British Special Advisor (List of political scandals in the United Kingdom#2000s)
- Joanne Moore (born 1976), English-born American tennis player and coach, a/k/a Joanne Wallen
