= Walter Cecil Moore =

English mycologist and phytopathologist

Walter Cecil Moore CBE (1900, Frome, Somerset, UK – 18 November 1967) was an English mycologist and phytopathologist. He was the president of the British Mycological Society in 1941 and the president of the Association of Applied Biologists from 1947 to 1948.

== Biography ==
Walter Cecil Moore was a pupil at Sexey's School, Bruton — of which another former pupil was F. T. Brooks. In 1919 Moore matriculated at Trinity College, Cambridge and graduated there in 1922 with a bachelor's degree in natural sciences and an M.A. in 1926. For his M.A., Moore studied under F. T. Brooks and in post-graduate work collaborated with Brooks on silver leaf disease of plum trees.

At the Plant Pathology Laboratory, Harpenden of the Ministry of Agriculture and Fisheries, Moore held the appointments Assistant Mycologist from 1925 to 1948, deputy director from 1948 to 1949, and Director from 1949 to 1962, when he retired due to ill health. For about 10 years from 1926 to 1936 he worked with George Herbert Pethybridge. According to F. Joan Moore, as director of the Plant Pathology Laboratory, Moore was "creative and decisive." In 1950 he recruited Ernest Charles Large to the Plant Pathology Laboratory. Moore published many scientific articles and several books. His 1939 book Diseases of Bulbs and his 1959 book British Parasitic Fungi are particularly noteworthy. Lilian Hawker highly recommended British Parasitic Fungi to mycologists and plant pathologists and praised Moore for his "unrivalled knowledge and practical experience of diseases of economic plants in Britain".

From 1946 to 1951 Moore was co-editor-in-chief of the Transactions of the British Mycological Society. He served on many committees and participated in several scientific societies. He helped the UN's Food and Agriculture Organization (FAO) to inaugurate the Plant Protection Convention in 1957. For his public service, Moore was appointed Commander of the Most Excellent Order of the British Empire (CBE) in 1955.

Moore played hockey, badminton, and tennis. He enjoyed gardening, classical music, and C. P. Snow's books. Moore and his wife often vacationed in the Isles of Scilly and they both frequently participated in the forays of the British Mycological Society. His brother, M. H. Moore, was a plant pathologist at East Malling Research Station in Kent.

== Selected publications ==
- Brooks, F. T.; Moore, W. C. (1926). "Silver-Leaf Disease.—V". Journal of Pomology and Horticultural Science. 5 (2): 61–97. doi:10.1080/03683621.1925.11513289.
- Moore, W. C.; Buddin, Walter (1937). "A New Disease of Tulip Caused by Species of Pythium". Annals of Applied Biology. 24 (4): 752–761. doi:10.1111/j.1744-7348.1937.tb05054.x. (See Pythium.) Most of Buddin's more important work was done in collaboration with Elsie Maud Wakefield.
- Moore, W. C. (1943). Diseases of crop plants. A ten year review (1933-1942). Bulletin 126 of the Ministry of Agriculture and Fisheries, Great Britain. London: H. M. Stationery Office. LCCN 44046162; 100 pages
- Moore, W. C.; Brooks, F. T. (1944). "Proceeding of the Association of Applied Biologists". Annals of Applied Biology. 31 (4): 360–366. doi:10.1111/j.1744-7348.1944.tb06748.x.
- Moore, W. C. (1945). Cereal Diseases. Bulletin 129 of the Ministry of Agriculture and Fisheries, Great Britain. London: H. M. Stationery Office. LCCN 48013068.
- Moore, W. C. (1948). "Mycology and plant pathology" (PDF). Transactions of the British Mycological Society. 30: 64–66.
- "The need for encouraging the study of systematic mycology in England and Wales". Transactions of the British Mycological Society. 32: 104–112. 1949. doi:10.1016/S0007-1536(49)80040-4. a report prepared by a committee consisting of G. C. Ainsworth, Miss E. M. Blackwell, K. St G. Cartwright, R. V. Harris, W. C. Moore (Chairman), J. Ramsbottom, G. Smith, and Miss E. M. Wakefield (Convener)
- Moore, W. C. (1952). "Principles Underlying Plant Import and Export Regulations". Plant Pathology. 1: 15–17. doi:10.1111/j.1365-3059.1952.tb00014.x.
