= Ulmus minor 'Sowerbyi' =

Elm cultivar

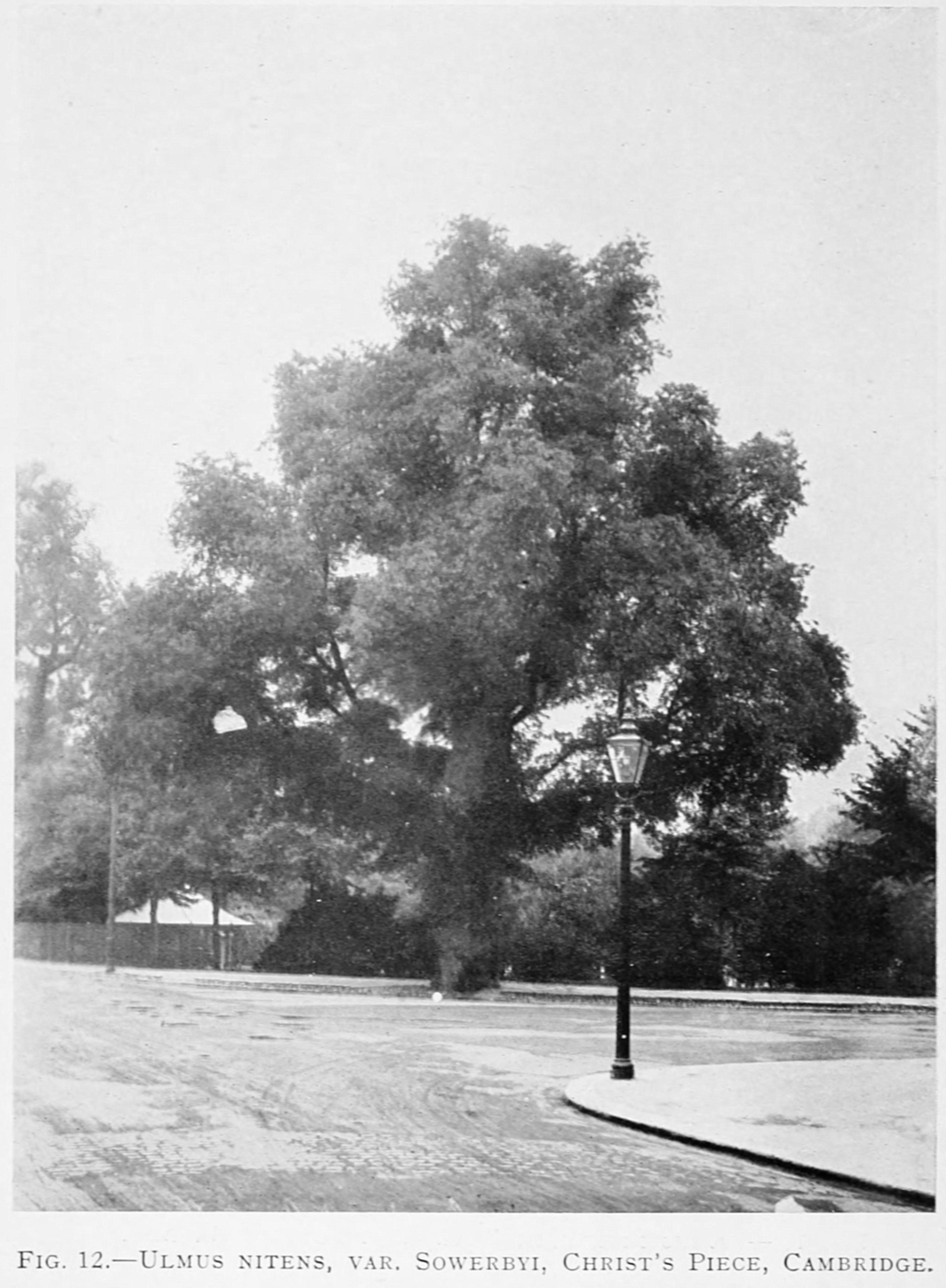
- 'Sowerbyi', Christ's Piece, Cambridge before 1915
- Species: Ulmus minor
- Cultivar: 'Sowerbyi'
- Origin: England

The Field Elm cultivar Ulmus minor 'Sowerbyi', commonly known as the Sowerby Elm, was described (as Ulmus nitens var. sowerbyi Moss) by Moss in The Cambridge British Flora (1914). The tree, once referred to as the 'Norfolk Elm' by Smith, was commonly found in the hedgerows and woods of Norfolk, Cambridgeshire, and Huntingdonshire in the early 20th century before the advent of Dutch elm disease. Melville considered it a hybrid of 'Coritana'.

The tree was named for the botanical artist James Sowerby, who had illustrated it in English Botany, or Coloured Figures of British Plants (1863, figure T.2248), from a specimen collected in Essex c.1810 and now in the Borrer Herbarium at Kew.

== Description ==
A smaller tree than 'Hunnybunii', the branches shorter and the upper ones very tortuous; leaves smaller and acute. The obovate to elliptical fruits are also smaller than 'Hunnybunii'. "Type" specimens of leaves and samarae from the Parker Street tree in Cambridge (see 'Notable trees'), obtained on the instructions of Moss, are preserved in the Cambridge University Herbarium.

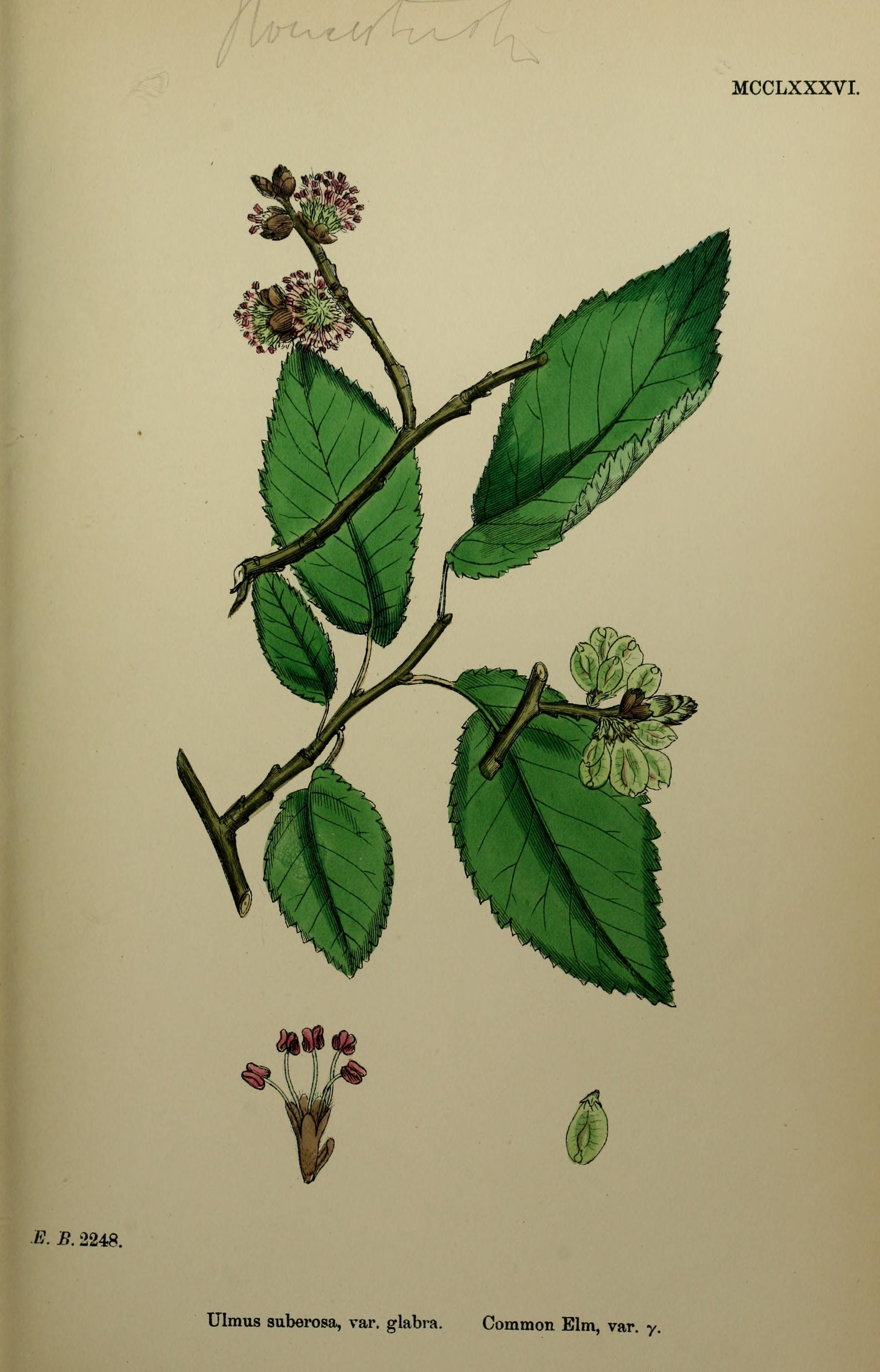
'Sowerbyi', from English Botany, or Coloured Figures of British Plants.

== Pests and diseases ==
Though susceptible to Dutch Elm Disease, field elms produce suckers and usually survive in this form in their area of origin.

== Cultivation ==
Moss in The Cambridge British Flora (1914) described 'Sowerbyi' as "often planted, as on Christ's Pieces, Cambridge". 'Sowerby' was cultivated in the Netherlands (The Hague and Wageningen) in the mid-20th century, as part of the elm collection assembled there the 1930s for DED-testing by Christine Buisman, on behalf of the Dutch Elm Committee.

== Notable trees ==
Moss's "type" tree stood by Christ's Pieces, Cambridge, at the junction of Parker Street and Emmanuel Road (also described as "on the pavement near the junction of Drummer Street and Emmanuel Road") and was (1932) 77 ft (23 m) high, with a diameter of 5.5 ft (1.7 m) towards the base and the branches spread 72 ft (22 m) across. In 1954 the tree, which had lad lower horizontal branches removed in the 1940s, had a bole-girth of 16 feet and was estimated to be about 250 years old. In addition to F. G. Preston's c.1914 photograph, a second photograph of the tree, showing its tortuous winter branching, appeared in the Cambridge Daily News in 1954. Shortly after, the tree was propagated by the University Botanic Garden, and severely pruned owing to decay.
