= Charles E. Sexey =

British gold rush pioneer (1818–1888)

Charles Eamer Sexey (March 1818 – 24 July 1888) was an English trader. He first visited New Zealand as a young man where he farmed and traded. In 1849 he travelled to San Francisco and took part in the Gold Rush as a trader in the mining camps. Eventually, having made his fortune out of the mining industry, he moved to Marysville, California, where he became a Levee Commissioner, landowner and President of the informal anti-mining activist group, the Anti-Debris Association, which was concerned with protecting landowner rights. He built some of the most important buildings in the city, one of which housed the Appeal newspaper, now known as the Appeal-Democrat.

== Biography ==
Charles E. Sexey was born in London in March 1818. His surname is unusual and the name can be traced mostly to the Hampshire/Dorset area of England. The most famous person bearing this surname is Hugh Sexey of Bruton, Somerset, an auditor for Queen Elizabeth I.

== New Zealand ==
In an account recorded on 17 April 1935 by Mr. J. Oliphant, Sexey's daughter Elizabeth Mainwaring stated as follows: "This is the story of Rihi Huanga daughter of Charles Sexey a Pākehā (European) who came to the Waikato in the early days, long before Morgan the Missionary. He was one of four stowaway boys, all Pakehas, who came up the Waikato from the coast. Porokora and Hakepa, two of the Waikato chiefs, adopted them."

Although Sexey's arrival in New Zealand has not been dated, the New Zealand Government Gazette of 1841 gave notice of a letter awaiting him at the post office. By that time, he had adopted a local name, Tiara Tikitini, and he was living in Te Awamutu. Te Awamutu was a pā, a settlement occupied by the Waikato people. They had fled there from Ngāpuhi at the time of the Matakitaki massacre in 1822 and were given shelter by the Ngati-Ngutu people and land at Otawhao. There a pa was built by Ngutu, son of Whaita of the Ngati-Turanga or Tainui people. This was the world of the young Charles Sexey, a pa occupied by the Waikato people, with the ministry of the Reverend Morgan, a devout Protestant and staunch anti-Catholic.

According to local custom Sexey married a chief's daughter named Rihi (Rea) Tahuta and they had four children, Catherine (birth date unknown), Henry (born about 1843), Sarah (born 23 October 1846) and Elizabeth (born 26 March 1848). During the early years he is recorded as making his living as a 'flour miller'. In 1847, a Mr. Hardington of the Victoria Hotel appointed Sexey as his agent and an Auckland street directory of 1848 shows him as having a shop in Shortland Street.

However, on 6 June 1849 he left New Zealand forever, leaving behind his wife and four young children. He was off to make his fortune in the goldfields of California. He sailed on the brig Fanny, which arrived in San Francisco on 29 August 1849, with Captain Francis D. Leathard in charge. On board were 42 passengers with children.

== Mining prosperity ==
Sexey set up as a trader in gold mining towns. Gold had been discovered on the Yuba River in June 1848 by Jonas Spect of Pennsylvania, and by the spring of 1850 there was a population of 1,000 with six stores, eight hotels and eight or ten saloons. He was listed on the census for 1860 at Long Bar, a Yuba County mining town on the main Yuba River above the confluence with Dry Creek, near Parks Bar. The diggings there gave out in 1864. He is also listed as having a store in a mining camp, Browns Valley.

== Marysville ==
By 1863 he was on his way to becoming a property developer as evidenced by a newspaper reference to "a building Charles Sexey will erect on D Street." This was the Tremont Block on the corner of 2nd Street and Maiden Lane. Etchings of the place show a massive construction that was to house the Appeal Steam Printing House, the Daily and Weekly Appeal, F. Buttleman & Co, Wholesale and Retail Licquor Dealers and W.L. Lawrence, Harness and Saddlery.

In 1864 at the Catholic Church in Marysville, Sexey married Jane Frances O’Donnell, born in Ardare, County Donegal, Ireland. She was aged 26 and a devout Catholic.

Sexey went on to become one of the seven trustees of the local woollen mill, a highly successful venture incorporated in the spring of 1867 with a capital stock of $50,000. By the time of the 1870 census he is noted as being a 46-year-old Englishman with a 32-year-old wife and a young Chinese cook. His assets are $80,000 with $20,000 in real estate. He is recorded as resident at 5th near the corner of Maiden Lane. There are many records during these years of his buying and selling property in Marysville, such as on 28 January 1870 at 2:20 p.m., he purchased the famous 'Ramirez Castle' for $4,125 in gold coin. In spite of the high cost he and Jane never lived in the house. By 1870, it is said he "enjoyed a comfortable standard of living from the wise investments he chose." A lithograph shows his home as being built of brick, quite large and occupying a substantial corner site.

Charles Sexey was naturalised as an American citizen on 3 November 1876, with registration of same not taking place until June 1880.

The Marysville Appeal Directory of 1878-79 reported that Charles Sexey was a Levee Commissioner born in England who held 280 acres (1.1 km^{2}) of land. William Turner Ellis Jr, a levee commissioner appointed in 1900, wrote of an event when the dam broke and raging waters hurled towards Marysville. A telegram was sent to "the mayor or Charles Sexey" giving news of the imminent danger. Sexey and several others raced to the town to give warning. However, the flood was averted because the levee on the south bank of the Yuba River had broken, allowing water and debris to run through the township of Linda to the Feather River as other floods had done before.

First appointed a director in August 1881 and having served for at least three years as president, he resigned the Anti-Debris Association on 3 May 1887, saying that the duties of the office were "onerous" and his health had been greatly impaired. The Board refused to accept his resignation; nevertheless, he insisted and left on a year-long trip to Europe. On 24 July 1888, he caught a chill during a trip to Oban in Scotland and died.

== Sexey estate ==
For the purposes of probate the estate was appraised at $100,000 and included stock in the San Francisco Gas Light Company, California Insurance Company, California Electric Company, Spring Valley Water Company, and the Bank of California. In addition to this he was a stockholder in the Marysville Woollen Mill, and had both business and residential property in Marysville.

His widow Jane lived on for approximately eight years. During this time she spent time in San Francisco as a semi-permanent guest at Lick House, an expensive and fashionable hotel, and it is there she died in late August 1896. It was reported that the deceased had no known relatives and that her money was left to charitable institutions. On 10 December 1897 Charles, who had died in Scotland, and his wife Jane who had died in America were 'laid to rest in one mound' in Oakland, California according to Jane's wishes.

Charles Sexey's four children in New Zealand never received a penny of their father's wealth or ever derived any benefit from it.

== See also ==
- Sexey's School
