= Ulmus minor 'Coritana' =

Elm cultivar

- Ulmus minor 'Coritana', drawing by Melville, 1949 of a tree (ref 46.31), 1/4 mile west of Ermine Street on the Tadlow Road, Cambridgeshire.
- Species: Ulmus minor
- Cultivar: 'Coritana'
- Origin: England

The Field Elm cultivar Ulmus minor 'Coritana' was originally claimed by Melville, while he was searching in the neighbourhood of Leicestershire in 1936 for U. elegantissima, as a new species, which he called U. coritana. He later recorded its distribution in the counties of Bedfordshire, Berkshire, Buckinghamshire, Cambridgeshire, Essex, Hertfordshire, Leicestershire, Nottinghamshire, Norfolk, Oxfordshire, Suffolk and Warwickshire. Richens, however, dismissed U. coritana as 'an artificial aggregate' of local forms of Field Elm. Bean noted (1988) that Melville's U. coritana was not recognised in the Flora of the British Isles as a species distinct from U. carpinifolia [:U. minor].

By the proposed rule that known or suspected clones of U. minor, once cultivated and named, should be treated as cultivars, the tree would be designated U. minor 'Coritana'.

== Description ==
Described as a rather spreading tree less than 20 m (66 ft) high, with ascending branches and rather open crown. Melville identified three varieties of U. coritana: var. rotundifolia, var. media and var. angustifolia, the three being connected by intermediate forms whose leaves decreased in breadth and increased in asymmetry from south to north. "The species was distinctive," summarized Gerald Wilkinson, "not by its spreading, open crown, but by the bright green, leathery texture and marked asymmetry of its leaves." Melville described the leaves as "the most asymmetrical of any British elm" and included a drawing of them in his 1948 paper, 'The British Elms', in The New Naturalist.

A 2007 study of the elms of County Cork, Ireland, identified a number of introduced field elms there (aside from the known Cornish elms) as closest to Melville's 'Coritana', on account of the leaf's curved midrib and petiole and other diagnostic features.

== Etymology ==
Melville named U. coritana after the ancient British tribe, the Coritani, who had occupied part of the territory in which he found the elm.

== Pests and diseases ==
Like other members of the U. minor group, Melville's 'Coritana' are susceptible to Dutch elm disease, but as they produce abundant root-suckers immature specimens probably survive in their areas of origin.

== Cultivation ==
Specimens held by the Royal Botanic Gardens at Kew and Wakehurst Place were listed under the species name U. coritana.

== Hybrids ==
Melville considered that both 'Hunnybunii' and 'Sowerbyi' were hybrids of 'Coritana'. He also believed that an elm he called Ulmus × diversifolia had 'Coritana' in its parentage. Kew and Wakehurst Place lists include putative hybrids between 'Coritana' and other forms of U. minor, and between 'Coritana' and Ulmus glabra.
