= Ulmus minor 'Hunnybunii pseudo-Stricta' =

Elm cultivar

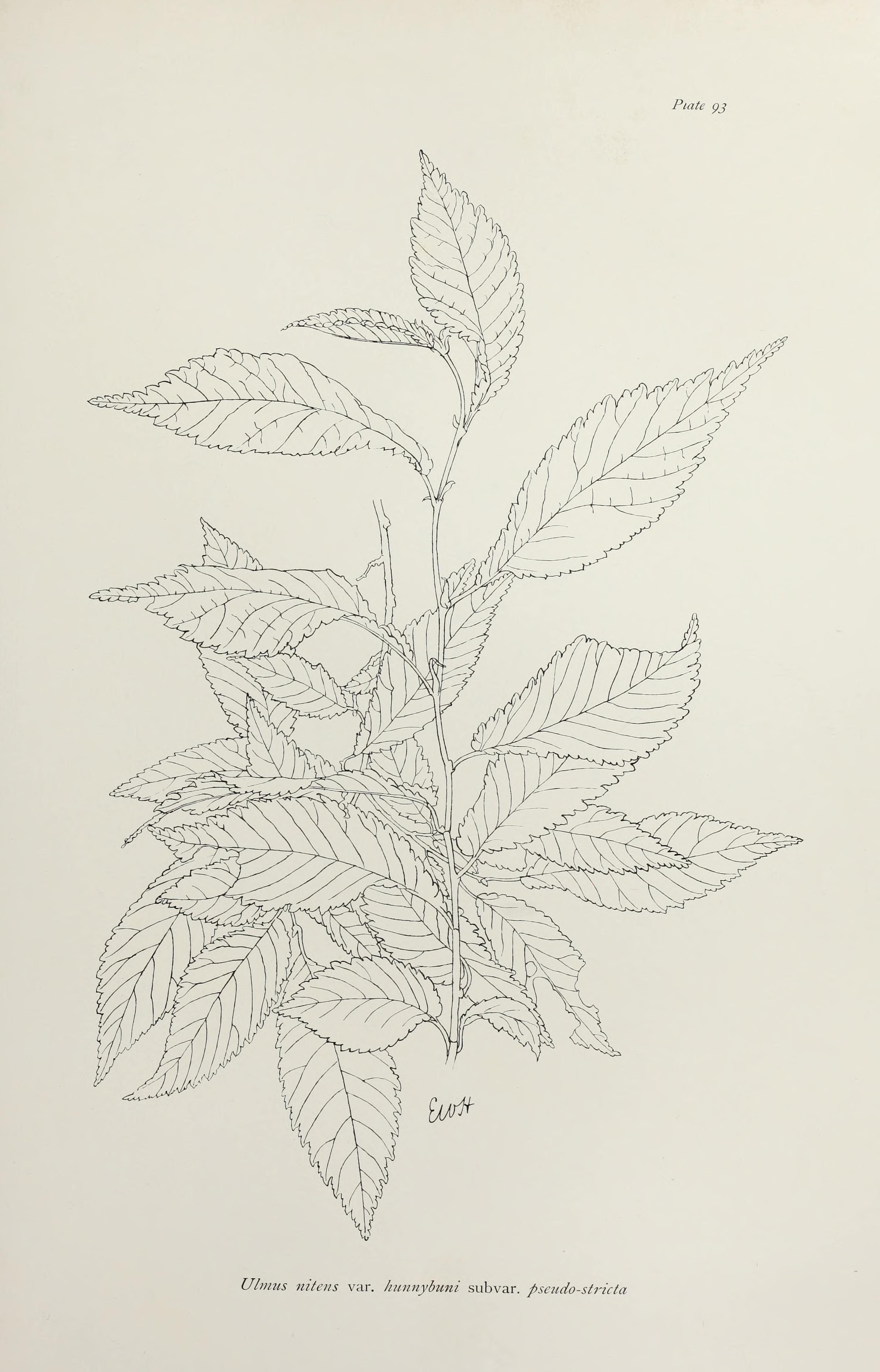
- Leaves of 'Hunnybunii pseudo-Stricta', by E. W. Hunnybun, from The Cambridge British Flora (1914)
- Species: Ulmus minor
- Cultivar: 'Hunnybunii pseudo-Stricta'
- Origin: England

The Field Elm cultivar Ulmus minor 'Hunnybunii pseudo-Stricta' was originally identified as U. nitens var. Hunnybunii pseudo-Stricta Moss by Moss in The Cambridge British Flora (1914). Moss regarded the tree as a "subvariety" of U. nitens var. 'Hunnybunii', with a narrower form.

== Description ==
Moss described 'Hunnybunii pseudo-Stricta' as "differing in the shorter internodes of the young twigs, which tend to remain in one plane, giving the trees a striking appearance". Samara and leaf drawings by E. W. Hunnybun, showing a narrower leaf than 'Hunnybunii', appear in The Cambridge British Flora (1914).

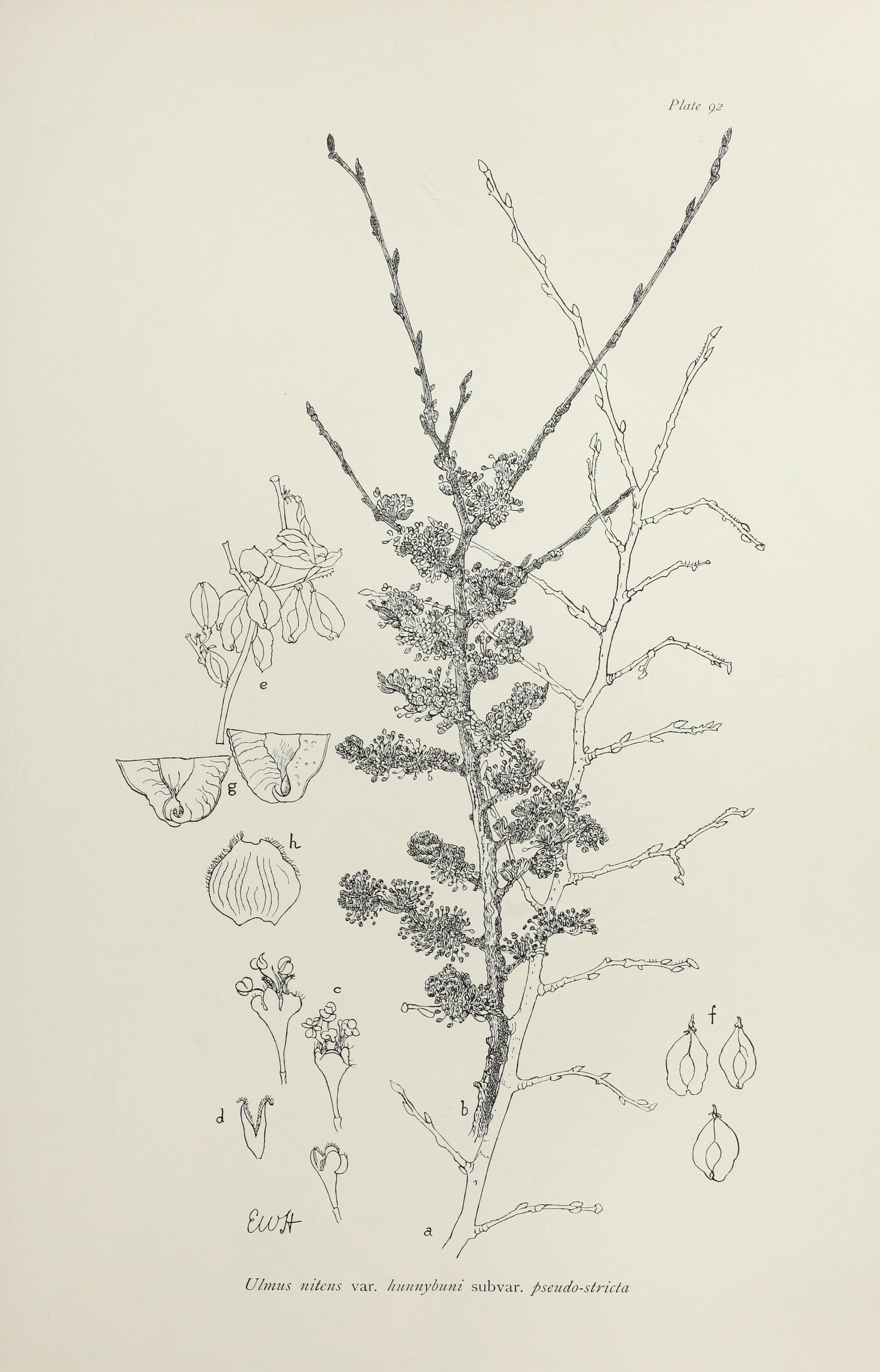
'Hunnybunii pseudo-Stricta': flowers and fruit

== Pests and diseases ==
Though susceptible to Dutch Elm Disease, field elms produce suckers and usually survive in this form in their area of origin.

== Cultivation ==
Moss in The Cambridge British Flora (1914) noted that 'Hunnybunii pseudo-Stricta' was sometimes propagated in error for Cornish Elm, Ulmus stricta – hence its name. No mature specimens are known to survive.

=== Putative specimens ===
A non-Cornish 'Stricta'-type field elm cultivar with the marked unilateral 'Hunnybunii pseudo-Stricta' twig-pattern described by Moss, and with leaves matching Hunnybun's drawing, was planted in Warriston Cemetery, Edinburgh, in the early 20th century and survives there through sucker regrowth. Unlike Cornish elm, its leaves flush and fall early in the season.

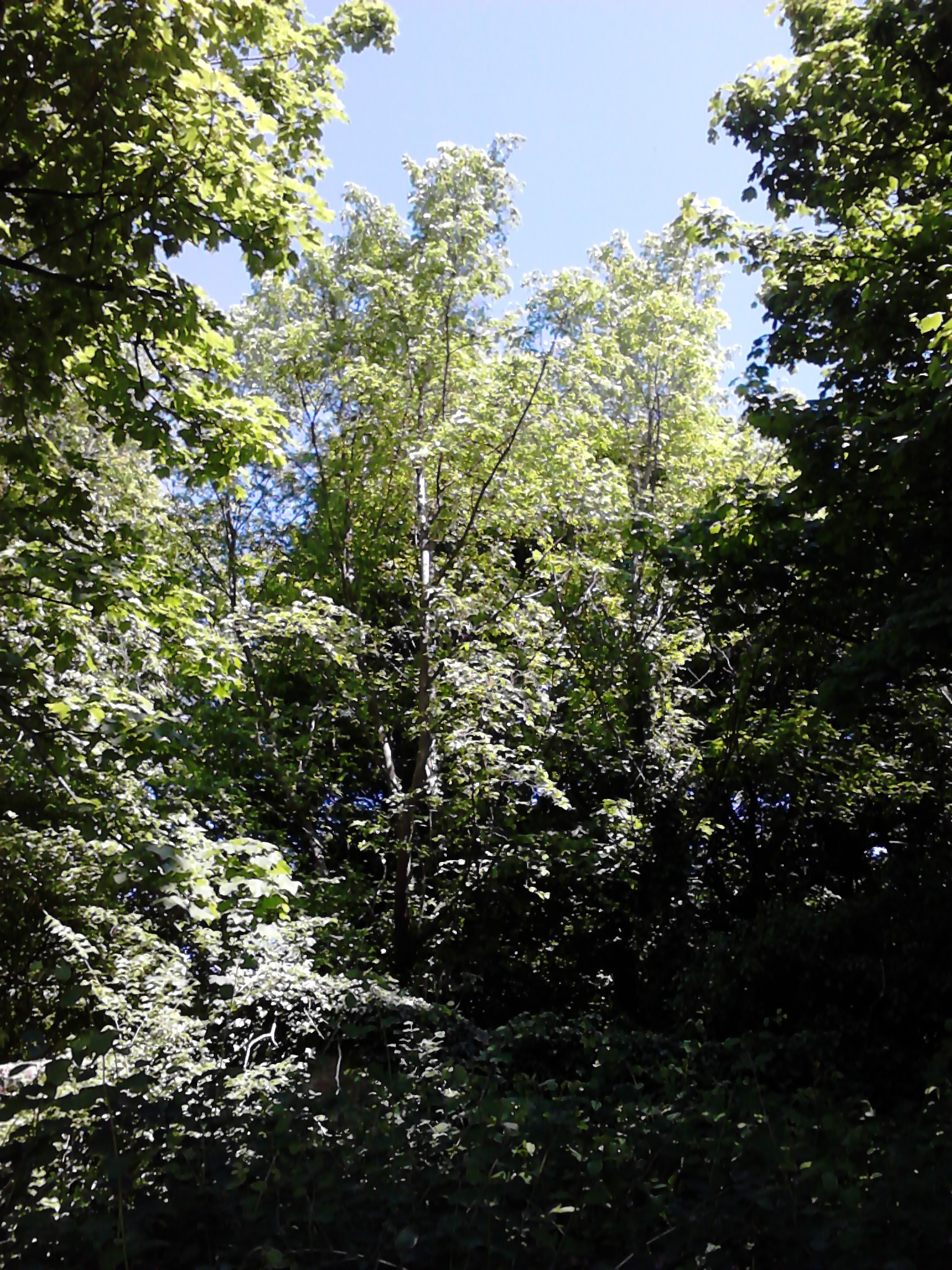
Fastigiate field elm, Warriston Cemetery, Edinburgh

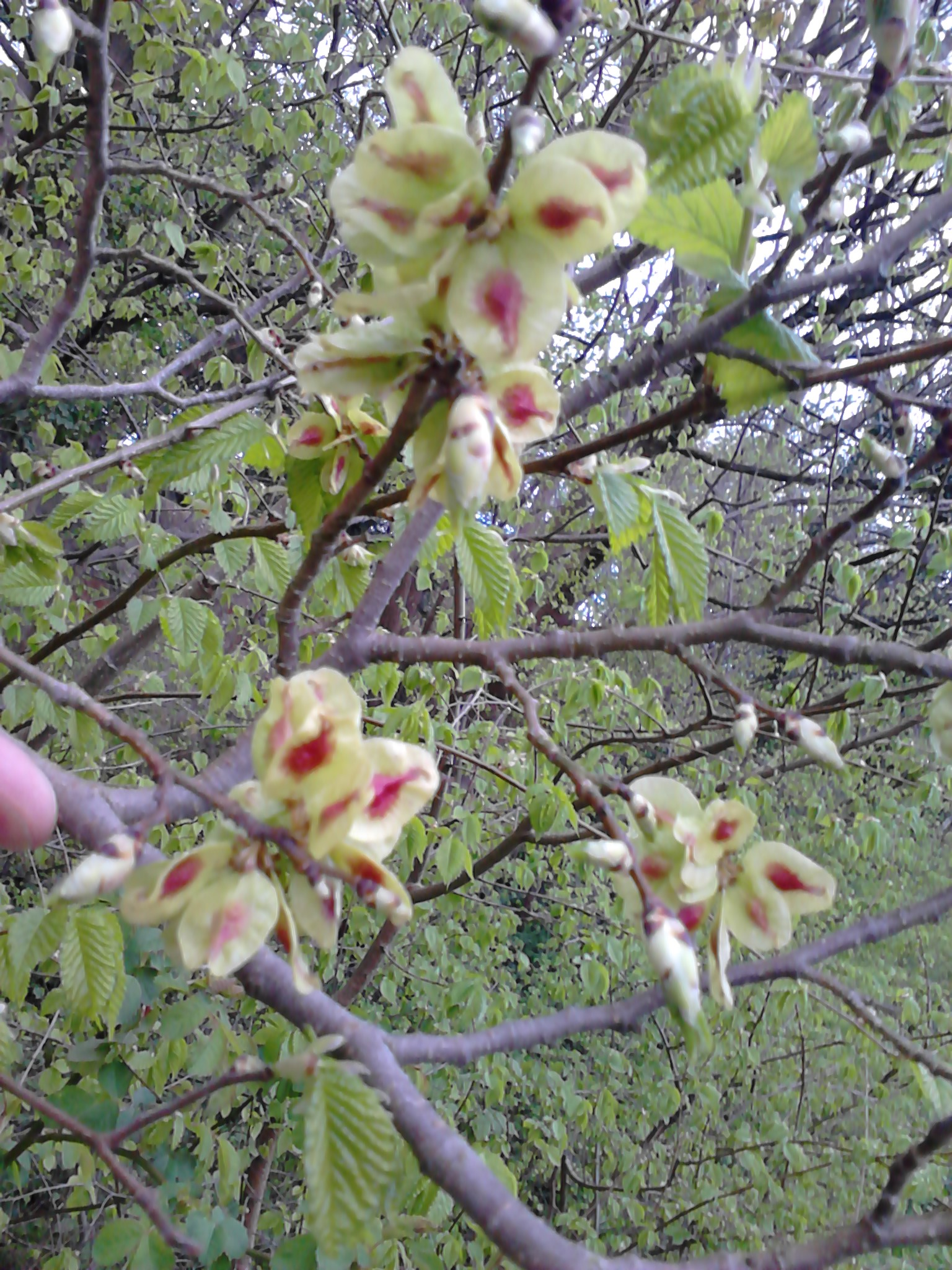
Fruit of same

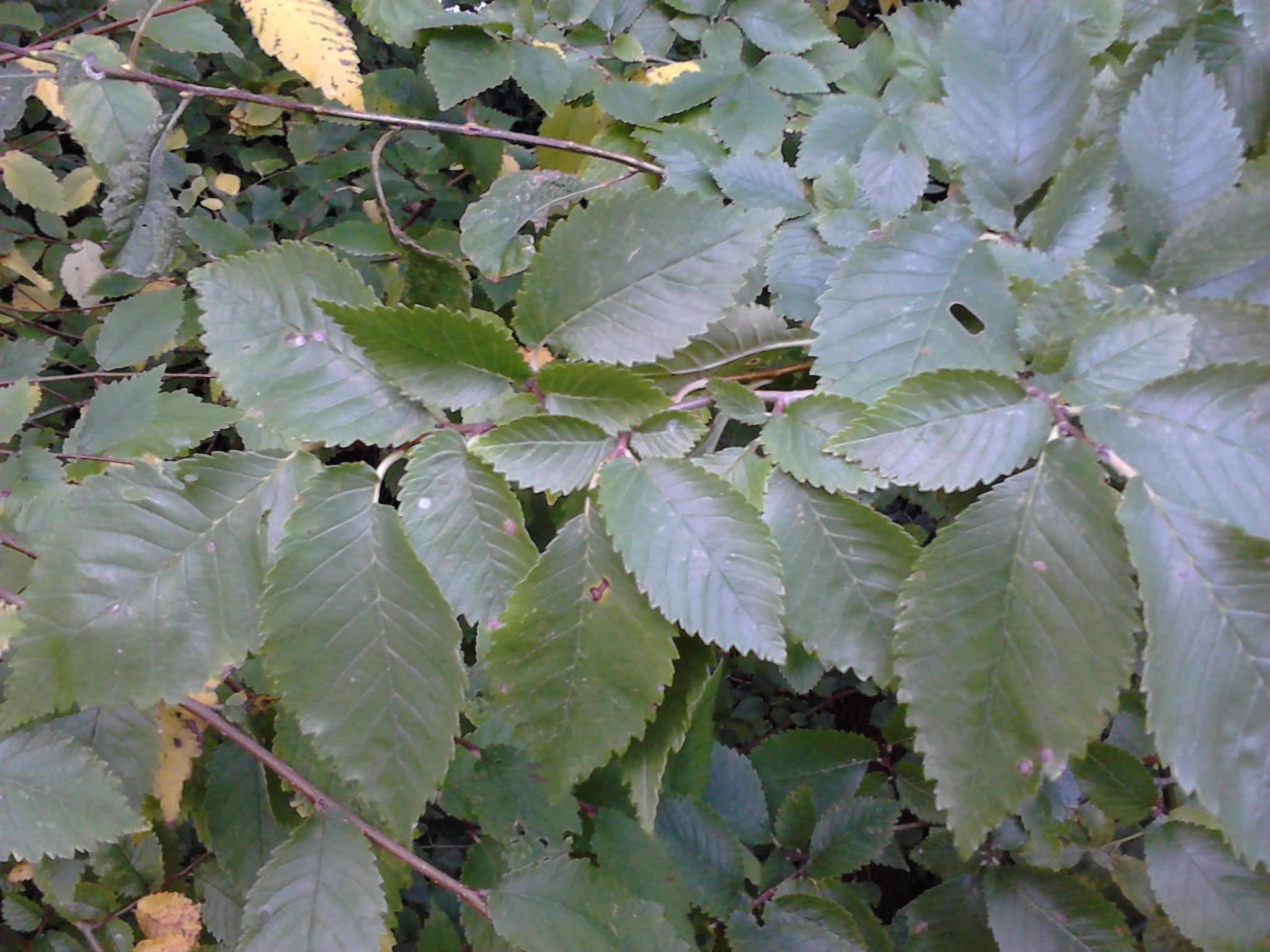
Juvenile foliage

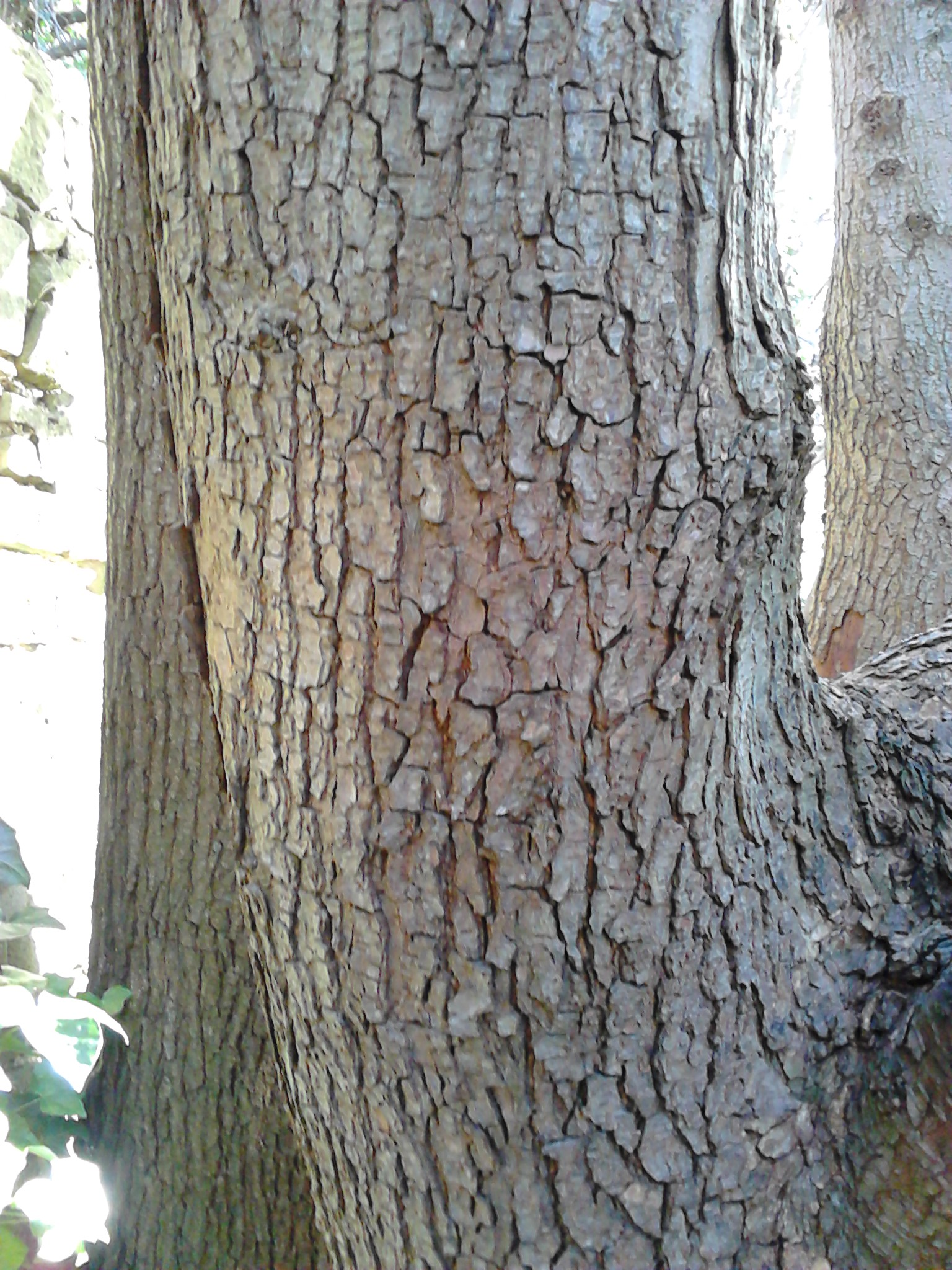
Bark
