= Carr-Gomm =

Carr-Gomm is a surname. Notable people with the surname include:

- Hubert Carr-Gomm (1877–1939), British politician and publisher
- Philip Carr-Gomm (born 1952), British spiritual writer
- Richard Carr-Gomm (1922–2008), British philanthropist

== See also ==
- Carr (surname)
- Gomm
