= Ulmus × diversifolia =

Elm cultivar

- Ulmus × diversifolia, drawing by Melville, 1939 of a tree (ref 36.16), near Bramfield, Hertfordshire.
- Hybrid parentage: U. glabra × U. minor 'Plotii' × U. minor 'Coritana'
- Origin: England

Ulmus × diversifolia, also known as the diverse leaved elm, was originally described by Melville in 1939 as a new species, U. diversifolia, though he later believed it a natural hybrid of Coritanian elm, Plot elm and Wych elm. He recorded its distribution in Hertfordshire, between Hatfield, Hertford and Watton-at-Stone, and in Suffolk, where it was common along the coastal plain from Ipswich and Felixstowe to Lowestoft and Beccles, occurring inland as far as Diss and Debenham, and probably extending further north into Norfolk and south towards Colchester, Essex. He accordingly referred to it as "the East Anglian elm".

The inclusion of the disputed U. coritana in its parentage has affected the reception of U. × diversifolia. Richens, who rejected the former, ignored × diversifolia in his study of East Anglian elms.

== Description ==
Ulmus × diversifolia was described as an upright tree less than 20 m high with spreading branches and rather slender wiry branchlets. Gerald Wilkinson described its supposed distinguishing feature — about ten per cent of leaves on short symmetrical shoots — as "rather subtle". Melville included a drawing of the leaves in his 1946 paper, 'The British Elms', in The New Naturalist, and placed specimens in the Kew Herbarium.

== Pests and diseases ==
East Anglian hybrid elms, including those Melville's considered U. × diversifolia, are susceptible to Dutch elm disease, but as they produce abundant root-suckers immature specimens probably survive in their areas of origin.

== Cultivation ==
A rooted sucker was taken from a tree from the Hatfield to Hertford road and transferred to the arboretum nursery at Kew. Specimens held by the Royal Botanic Gardens at Wakehurst Place were listed as U. coritana × U. plotii × U. glabra and U. glabra × U. coritana × U. plotii.

== Notable trees ==
Melville's type tree (ref 36.265) was situated on the south side of the Hatfield to Hertford road about three miles east of Hatfield.

== Accessions ==
=== Europe ===
- Royal Botanic Gardens, Kew, UK. Acc. no. not known.
