= Gomm =

Gomm is a surname. Notable people with the surname include:

- Archie Gomm (1897–1978), English footballer
- Brian Gomm (1918–1995), British cricketer
- Ian Gomm (born 1947), British singer-songwriter
- Jon Gomm (born 1977), British singer-songwriter
- Margaret Gomm (1921–1974), British swimmer
- William Maynard Gomm (1784–1875), British Army officer
