= Mossia =

Scientific classification
- Kingdom: Plantae
- Clade: Tracheophytes
- Clade: Angiosperms
- Clade: Eudicots
- Order: Caryophyllales
- Family: Aizoaceae
- Subfamily: Ruschioideae
- Tribe: Ruschieae
- Genus: Mossia; N.E.Br.
- Species: M. intervallaris

Binomial name
- Mossia intervallaris (L.Bolus) N.E.Br.

Synonyms
- Antimima intervallaris (L.Bolus) H.E.K.Hartmann; Mesembryanthemum intervallare L.Bolus; Ruschia intervallaris L.Bolus

Species of flowering plant

Mossia is a monotypic genus of flowering plants belonging to the family Aizoaceae. It only contains one known species, Mossia intervallaris.

Its native range is Lesotho and South Africa and it is found in the provinces of the Cape Provinces, Free State and the Northern Provinces. It is listed as least concern on the Red List of South African Plants.

The genus name of Mossia is in honour of Charles Edward Moss (1870–1930), an English-born South African botanist, the youngest son of a nonconformist minister, and is noted for being the editor of the first two parts of The Cambridge British Flora published in 1914 and 1920. The Latin specific epithet of intervallaris refers to unusually long internodes (portion of a stem between two nodes). Both the genus and species were first described and published in Gard. Chron., series 3, Vol.87 on page 71 in 1930.

== Other sources ==
- Hall, A.V., De Winter, M., De Winter, B. and Van Oosterhout, S.A.M. 1980. Threatened plants of southern Africa. South African National Scienctific Programmes Report 45. CSIR, Pretoria.
- Hilton-Taylor, C. 1996. Red data list of southern African plants. Strelitzia 4. South African National Botanical Institute, Pretoria.
- Pfab, M.F. and Victor, J.E. 2002. Threatened plants of Gauteng, South Africa. South African Journal of Botany 68:370-375.
- Raimondo, D., von Staden, L., Foden, W., Victor, J.E., Helme, N.A., Turner, R.C., Kamundi, D.A. and Manyama, P.A. 2009. Red List of South African Plants. Strelitzia 25. South African National Biodiversity Institute, Pretoria.
