= L. J. F. Brimble =

Lionel John Farnham Brimble (16 January 1904 in Radstock, Somerset – 15 November 1965 in London) was a botanist, author, Fellow of the Royal Society of Edinburgh and editor of the journal Nature.

== Early life ==
He was born in 1904, the son of a blacksmith and innkeeper at Radstock, Somerset, where his early childhood was said to be very happy. He rejected a naval scholarship and instead attended Sexey's School in Bruton, Somerset, as a boarder. He won a scholarship to University College of Reading, where he read Botany under Professor W. Stiles. He obtained a BSc degree from Reading University.

== Career ==
In 1926 he went to Glasgow University as a science lecturer. He stayed only a year in Glasgow before he was offered a lectureship at the University of Manchester, where he worked from 1927 to 1930.

In Manchester he was also the theatre critic on a local paper. In 1931 he was offered the post of assistant editor of Nature magazine by its editor Sir Richard Gregory. He was later involved with the organisation of the British Social Hygiene Council which eventually became the Central Council for Health Education. He worked at various times with Sir Julian Huxley, Winifred Cullis, J. B. S. Haldane and Sir Robert Fields.

In 1939, on the retirement of Sir Richard, Brimble and his colleague A. J. V. Gale were appointed joint editors of Nature magazine. The partnership lasted 23 years, during which Nature published seminal papers in palaeoanthropology, nuclear energy, holography, lasers and the discovery of the double-helix structure of DNA.

During this period Brimble travelled widely abroad, particularly in America and Australia. At the end of 1961, Gale retired from the joint editorship, leaving Brimble as sole editor.

He suffered poor health in his fifties and died in London in 1965. He never married and had no children.

== Publications ==
- Everyday Botany (1934) ISBN 0333046846; 1949 edition
- Flowers in Britain (1944)
- Trees In Britain: Wild, Ornamental And Economic, And Some Relatives In Other Lands (1946)
- Social Studies and World Citizenship: A Sociological Approach to Education (1947)
- Nature Studies for Schools: With Suggestions for Practical, Field and Museum Work (1951)
- Flowers in Britain: Wild, Ornamental and Economic, and Some Relatives in Other Lands (1952)
- Intermediate Botany (1953)
- Useful Animals of the World (1956)
- Physiology, Anatomy and Health (1958)
- A School Course Of Biology, With Suggestions For Experimental And Field Work (1961)

== Achievements ==
- Fellow, Linnean Society of London, 1938.
- Fellow, Royal Society of Edinburgh, 1953.

Preceded by Sir Richard Gregory, 1st Baronet (1919-1939)	co-Editor in Chief of Nature; 1939-1961	Succeeded by L. J. F. Brimble (1961-1965)
Preceded by L. J. F. Brimble (1939-1961)	Editor in Chief of Nature; 1961-1965	Succeeded by John Maddox (1965-1973)
Preceded by A. J. V. Gale (1939-1961)	Editor in Chief of Nature; 1961-1965	Succeeded by John Maddox (1965-1973)
