= Ulmus minor 'Hunnybunii' =

Elm cultivar

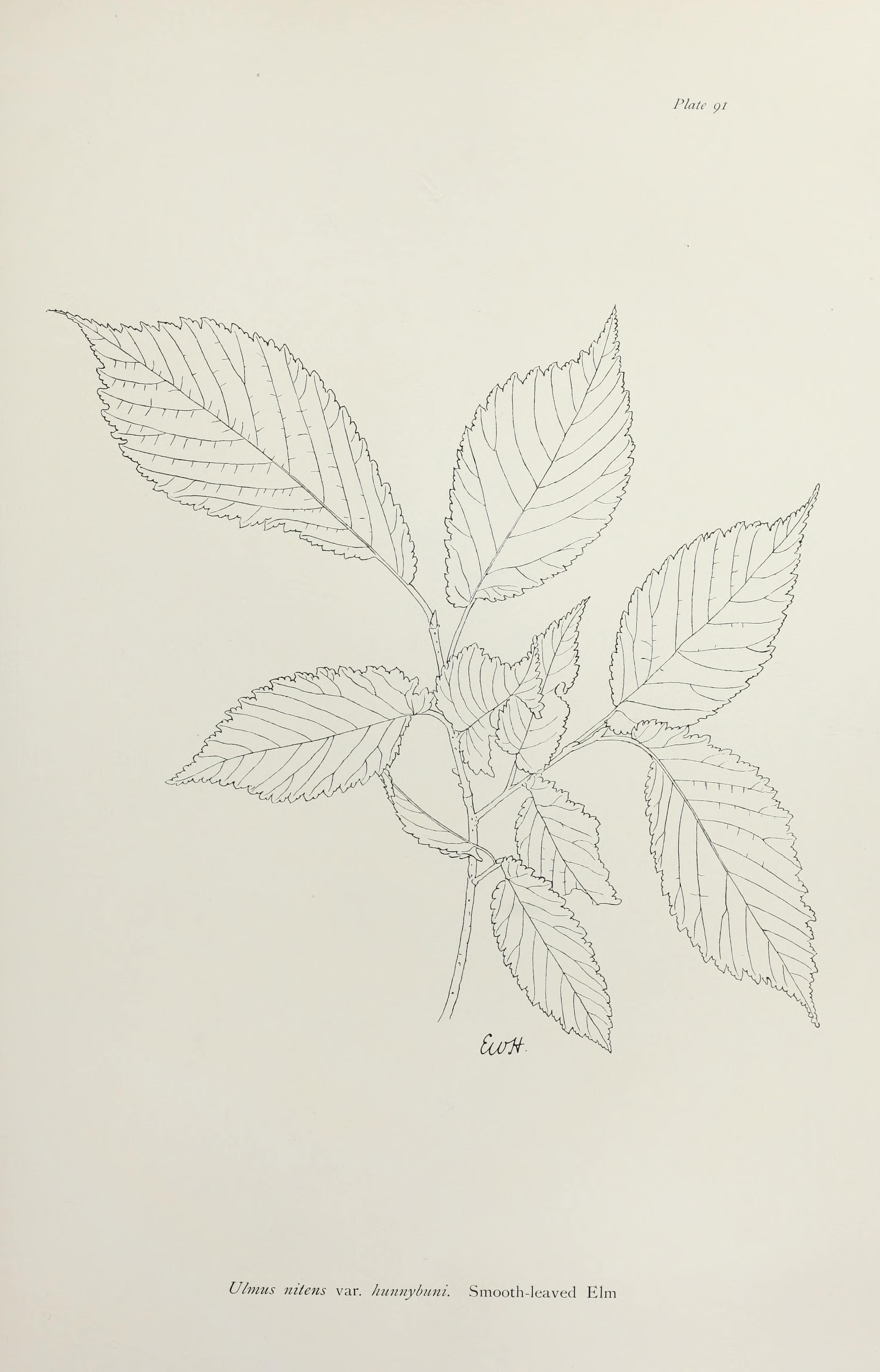
- 'Hunnybunii' leaves, by E. W. Hunnybun, from The Cambridge British Flora (1914)
- Species: Ulmus minor
- Cultivar: 'Hunnybunii'
- Origin: England

The Field Elm cultivar Ulmus minor 'Hunnybunii' was originally identified as U. nitens var. Hunnybunii Moss by Moss in The Cambridge British Flora (1914). 'Hunnybunii' was reputed to have been commonly planted in the parklands and hedgerows of Essex, Cambridgeshire, and Huntingdonshire before the advent of Dutch elm disease. Melville considered the tree a hybrid of 'Coritana'.

The tree was named for C. E. Moss's collaborator, the botanical artist E. W. Hunnybun.

== Description ==
Moss described 'Hunnybunii' as a taller tree than 'Sowerbyi', with the lower branches spreading at right angles, the upper less tortuous; leaves even more asymmetrical at the base, more acuminate at the apex. Samara and leaf drawings by E. W. Hunnybun appear in The Cambridge British Flora (1914).

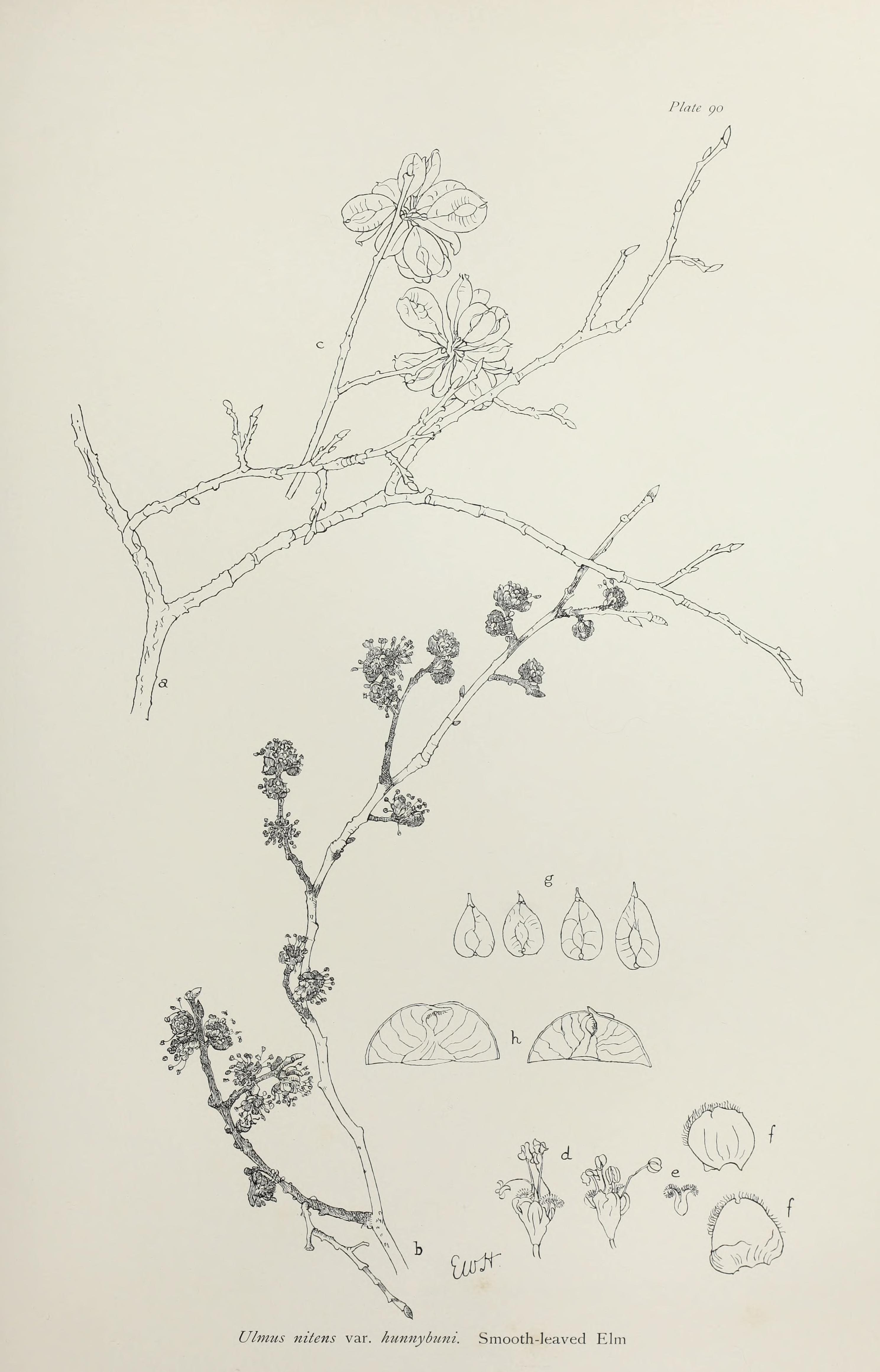
Flowers and fruit of 'Hunnybunii', by E. W. Hunnybun (1914)

== Pests and diseases ==
Though susceptible to Dutch Elm Disease, field elms produce suckers and usually survive in this form in their area of origin.

== Cultivation ==
Moss in The Cambridge British Flora (1914) described 'Hunnybunii' as "often planted, as in the grounds of St. John's College, Cambridge". Late 19th and early 20th century photographs of the St John's New Building lawn show elms matching the 'Hunnybunii' description. The tree was cultivated in The Netherlands (The Hague and Wageningen) in the mid-20th century as part of the elm collection assembled there the 1930s for DED-testing by Christine Buisman, on behalf of the Dutch Elm Committee.

No specimens are known to survive, but three mature elms (2021) beside Dean Road, Bartlow, near the Cambridgeshire-Essex border, resemble var. 'Hunnybunii' in form. Their leaves appear close to the 1962 Wageningen specimen WAG.1852692 of U. carpinifolia 'Hunnybunnii'. Moss regarded the elm as a variety not a clone, allowing for some variability in leaf-shape.

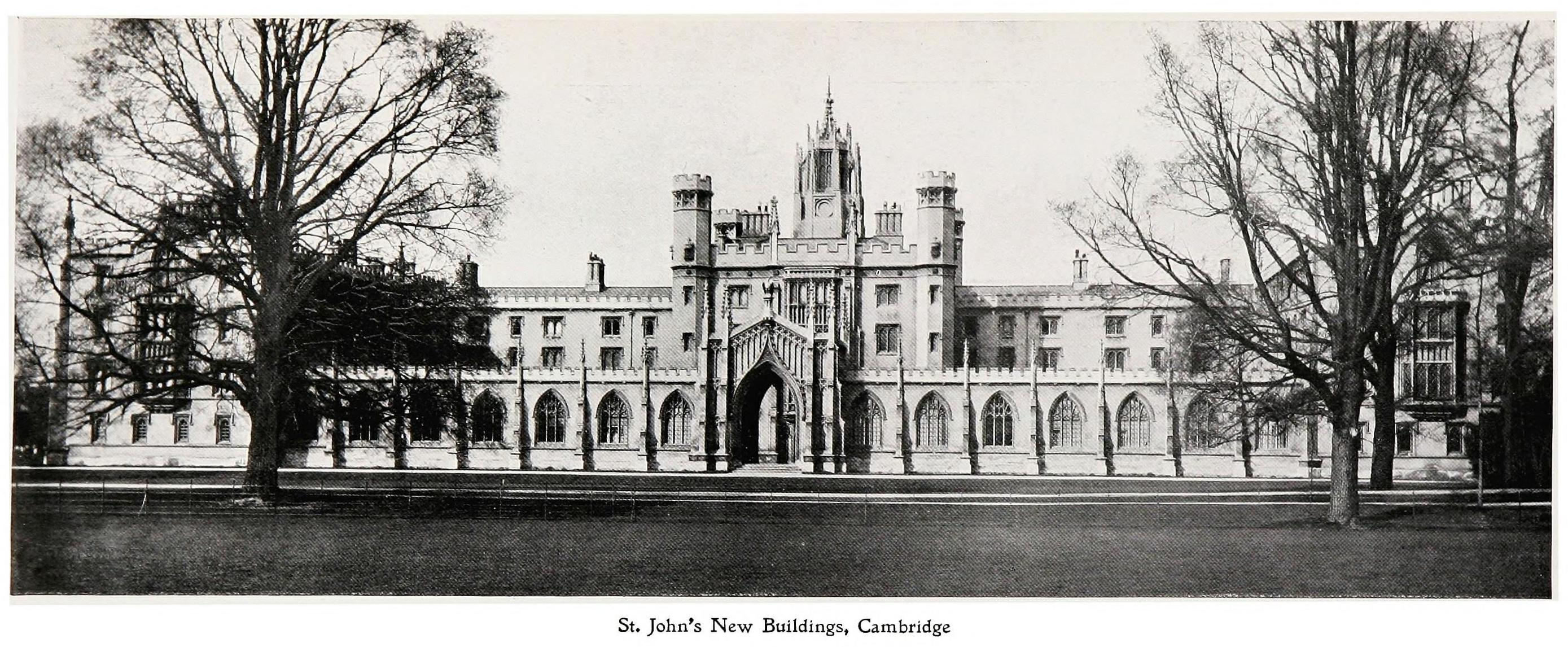
Elms matching 'Hunnybunii' description, St John's College, Cambridge (1910)

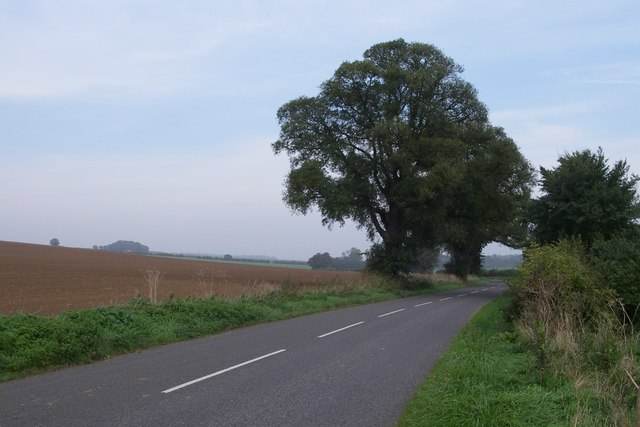
Dean Road elms, Bartlow, Cambridgeshire (2006)

== Varieties ==
- 'Hunnybunii pseudo-Stricta'
