= Bois-de-Haye =

- Commune
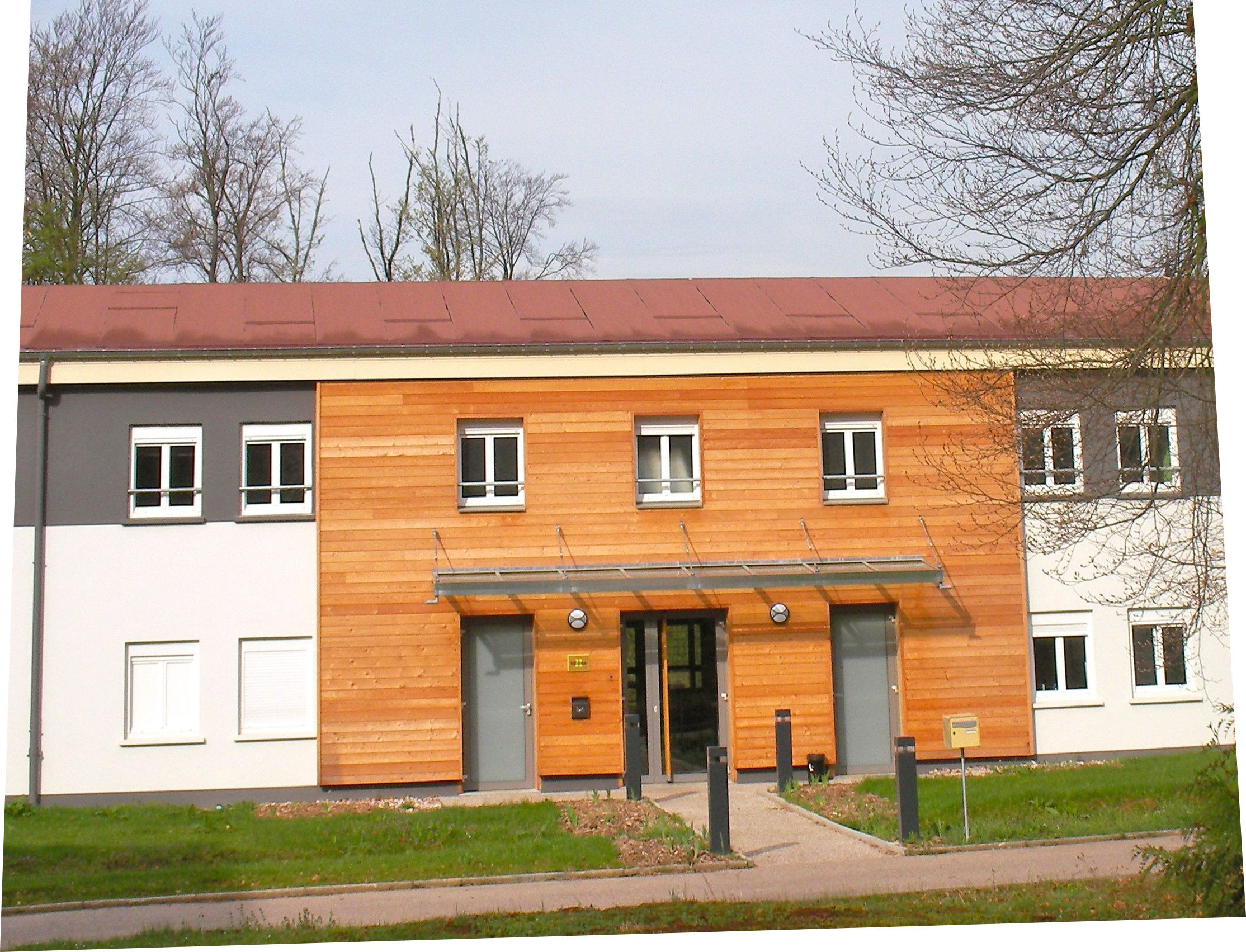
- The school in Bois-de-Haye
- Location of Bois-de-Haye
- Location within France Location within Grand Est
- Coordinates: 48°42′13″N 6°01′19″E
- Country: France
- Region: Grand Est
- Department: Meurthe-et-Moselle
- Arrondissement: Toul
- Canton: Le Nord-Toulois
- Intercommunality: Terres Touloises

Government
  - Mayor (2025–2026): Martine Henrion
- Area^{1}: 24.68 km^{2} (9.53 sq mi)
- Highest elevation: 346 m (1,135 ft)
- Lowest elevation: 220 m (720 ft)
- Population (2023): 2,312
  - Density: 93.68/km^{2} (242.6/sq mi)
- Time zone: UTC+01:00 (CET)
  - Summer (DST): UTC+02:00 (CEST)
- INSEE/Postal code: 54557 /54840
- ^{1} French Land Register data, which excludes lakes, ponds, glaciers > 1 km^{2} (0.386 sq mi or 247 acres) and river estuaries.

Bois-de-Haye (French pronunciation: [bwa də ɛ]) is a commune in the Meurthe-et-Moselle department in north-eastern France. It was established on 1 January 2019 by merger of the former communes of Velaine-en-Haye (the seat) and Sexey-les-Bois.

== Population ==
Population data refer to the area corresponding with the commune as of January 2025.

Historical population
Year	Pop.	±% p.a.
1968	671	—
1975	1,044	+6.52%
1982	1,133	+1.18%
1990	1,601	+4.42%
1999	1,810	+1.37%
2007	1,827	+0.12%
2012	1,908	+0.87%
2017	2,257	+3.42%
2023	2,312	+0.40%
Source: INSEE

== See also ==
- Communes of the Meurthe-et-Moselle department
