= Velaine-en-Haye =

- Part of Bois-de-Haye
- Location of Velaine-en-Haye
- Location within France Location within Grand Est
- Coordinates: 48°42′13″N 6°01′19″E
- Country: France
- Region: Grand Est
- Department: Meurthe-et-Moselle
- Arrondissement: Toul
- Canton: Le Nord-Toulois
- Commune: Bois-de-Haye
- Area^{1}: 17.87 km^{2} (6.90 sq mi)
- Elevation: 269 m (883 ft)
- Highest elevation: 346 m (1,135 ft)
- Lowest elevation: 240 m (790 ft)
- Population (2022): 1,900
  - Density: 110/km^{2} (280/sq mi)
- Time zone: UTC+01:00 (CET)
  - Summer (DST): UTC+02:00 (CEST)
- Postal code: 54840
- ^{1} French Land Register data, which excludes lakes, ponds, glaciers > 1 km^{2} (0.386 sq mi or 247 acres) and river estuaries.

Velaine-en-Haye (French pronunciation: [vəlɛn ɑ̃ ɛ]) is a former commune in the Meurthe-et-Moselle department in north-eastern France. On 1 January 2019, it was merged into the new commune Bois-de-Haye.

== See also ==
- Communes of the Meurthe-et-Moselle department
