= Sexy =

Sexy is an adjective to describe a sexually appealing person (or thing), primarily referring to physical attractiveness. It may also refer to:

- Sexual arousal, the arousal of sexual desire, during or in anticipation of sexual activity
- Sexual attraction, meaning anything which has the ability to attract the sexual or erotic interest of a person

== Arts and media ==
=== Music ===
- "Sexy" (Klymaxx song), by Klymaxx
- "Sexy (Is the Word)", a song by Melissa Tkautz
- "Sexy", a song by Bad Gyal from La joia
- "Sexy", a song by The Black Eyed Peas, from the album Elephunk
- "Sexy", a song by Chris Brown featuring Trey Songz from the album Indigo
- "Sexy", a song by Faraón Love Shady
- "Sexy", a song by French Affair
- "Sexy", a song by Australian Idol season 3 contestant Roxane LeBrasse
- "Sexy", a song by Les Jumo feat. Mohombi
- S.E.X.Y., an EP by TQ
- "S-E-X-X-Y", a song by They Might Be Giants
- "Sexy Sadie", a song by The Beatles

=== Other media ===
- Sexy (novel), 2005, by Joyce Carol Oates
- "Sexy" (Glee), a 2011 episode from the series' second season
- S3XY, standing for the Tesla EV models S, 3, X and Y respectively, intentionally selected to spell "sexy" on the Tesla web site; see List of Easter eggs in Tesla products#S3XY

== Other uses ==
- Sexy, Peru, a populated place in Peru
- Sexy prime, a pair of prime numbers that differ by six

== See also ==
- Sex (disambiguation)
