= Sexey's Hospital =

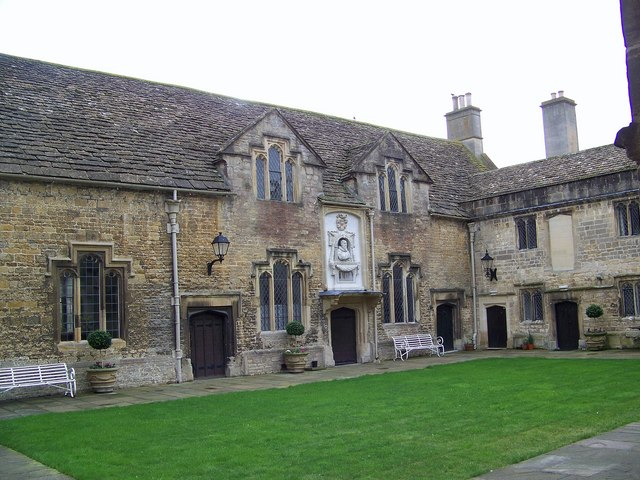

- Location within Somerset
- 51°06′43″N 2°27′18″W
- Location: Bruton, Somerset, England

History
- Built: c. 1630

Listed Building – Grade I
- Official name: West Wing and chapel
- Designated: 24 March 1961
- Reference no.: 1176086

Listed Building – Grade II
- Official name: East Wing and gateway link to West
- Designated: 24 March 1961
- Reference no.: 1346164

Hugh Sexey's Hospital in Bruton, Somerset, England was built around 1630 as almshouses. The West Wing and chapel have been designated as a Grade I listed building. The East Wing and gateway are grade II listed.

Hugh Sexey (1556–1619), was a local landowner. By the age of 43 he had been appointed Royal auditor of the Exchequer to King James I. After his death the trustees of his will established Sexey's Hospital in Bruton as an institution to care for the elderly.

A trust of 1638 set out the role of the hospital in caring for 12 poor men and women. This later rose to 18 people, and it provided a school for 12 boys, and staff comprised a governor, a schoolmaster, and a nurse. By 1812 this had risen to 20; 10 men and 10 women and in 1902 there were 15 residents. In 2025 there were 27 residents.

== See also ==
- List of Grade I listed buildings in South Somerset
