= Archie Gomm =

English footballer (1897–1978)

Personal information
- Full name: Archibald Frank Gomm
- Date of birth: 1 May 1897
- Place of birth: Beaconsfield, England
- Date of death: 1978 (aged 80–81)
- Position: Defender

Senior career*
Years	Team	Apps	(Gls)
1918–1919	Chesham United		
1919	Wycombe Wanderers		
1919–1920	Reading		
1920–1931	Millwall	187	(14)
1931–1933	Carlisle United	67	(0)
1933	Lancaster Town		
Total		254	(14)
- * Club domestic league appearances and goals

Archibald Frank Gomm (1 May 1897 – 1978) was an English footballer who played in the Football League for Carlisle United and Millwall.
