= Kenneth St George Cartwright =

Kenneth Thomas St. George Cartwright FLS (1891 – 17 October 1964) was an English mycologist, known as a leading expert on timber mycology.

== Biography ==
Kenneth Thomas St. George Cartwright was baptised on 10 May 1891 in Market Harborough, Leicestershire. After education at Bilton Grange, he graduated from Royal Naval College, Osborne and then attended Royal Naval College, Dartmouth, but left for health reasons without graduating. He then matriculated at Wadham College, Oxford, where he studied botany under Sydney Howard Vines and forestry under William Schlich. Cartwright joined the British Mycological Society (in 1913) and graduated with a B.A. from the University of Oxford. In 1914 when WW I began, he joined the British Army as a commissioned officer in the Rifle Brigade. After several years of active duty in France, his health was severely impaired by a gas attack. He was then transferred to the Royal Army Education Corps, where he remained until the end of WW I. He was awarded three war service medals. After brief employment at Kew Gardens and a refresher course at the Royal College of Science, Imperial College London, he obtained a D.S.I.R. grant to do research at the Royal College of Science. Supported by the grant, he worked under the supervision of Percy Groom, F.R.S. (1865–1931), on the problem of dry rot of wood in storage that is permanently or intermittently cold. In 1923 in Oxfordshire, Cartwright married Katherine Granger, whom he first met at the Royal College of Science. She did research, under the supervision of Vernon Herbert Blackman, on potato wart disease.

In 1923 the British Government's Department of Scientific and Industrial Research established the Forest Products Research Board, which in 1925 founded the Forest Products Research Laboratories at the Royal Aircraft Establishment in Hampshire. In 1927, a new site was prepared at Princes Risborough and more scientists were hired. In 1927 Cartwright became the Forest Products Research Laboratories' chief mycologist and held that post until he retired in 1948. He, with his long-term collaborator Walter Philip Kennedy Findlay, coauthored the 1936 monograph The Principal Rots of English Oak and the 1946 book Decay of Timber and its Preservation.

In 1915 Percy Groom published evidence that the process in some oak trees in which ordinary heart-wood is modified into "brown oak" is caused by a fungus. Cartwright showed that Fistulina hepatica causes "brown oak".

Cartwright was elected a Fellow of the Linnean Society of London in 1929 and was eventually awarded an M.A. by the University of Oxford. He served on the Lily Group of the Royal Horticultural Society and was the president of the British Mycological Society for one year from 1937 to 1938. In his garden at Towersey, he raised from seed many rare species of Primula and Meconopsis.

He died in Towersey in Oxfordshire in 1964; he was survived by his widow, their son, and five grandchildren.

== Selected publications ==
- Cartwright, K. St. G. (1932). "Further notes on Basidiomycetes in culture" (PDF). Transactions of the British Mycological Society. 16 (4): 304–307. doi:10.1016/S0007-1536(32)80006-9.
- Cartwright, K. S. G.; Findlay, W. P. K. (1936). The principal rots of English Oak. London: H. M. Stationery Office; v+38 pages. abstract
- Cartwright, K. St G. (1938). "A Further Note on Fungus Association in the Siricidae". Annals of Applied Biology. 25 (2): 430–432. doi:10.1111/j.1744-7348.1938.tb02343.x.
- Cartwright, K. St G.; Findlay, W. P. K. (1942). "Principal Decays of British Hardwoods". Annals of Applied Biology. 29 (3): 219–253. doi:10.1111/j.1744-7348.1942.tb07590.x.
- Cartwright, K. St G.; Findlay, W. P. K. (1943). "Timber Decay". Biological Reviews. 18 (4): 145–158. doi:10.1111/j.1469-185X.1943.tb00295.x. S2CID 221526715.
- Cartwright, Kenneth St George; Findlay, Walter Philip Kennedy (1946). Decay of Timber and Its Prevention. London: H.M. Stationery Office; vi+294 pages. 1950 reprint. Brooklyn, N.Y.: Chemical Publishing Co.
