= Walter Philip Kennedy Findlay =

US-born British mycologist (1904–1985)

Walter Philip Kennedy Findlay (10 February 1904 – 18 December 1985) was a US-born British mycologist who contributed to the study of wood pathology and preservation through his research on organisms associated with wood rot. After receiving his education at Sevenoaks School and Imperial College London, where he earned multiple scientific qualifications including a D.Sc. from the University of London in 1942, Findlay spent much of his career at the Forest Products Research Laboratory in Princes Risborough, collaborating with Kenneth St George Cartwright on their seminal text "Decay of Timber and its Prevention" (1935). His prolific scientific output extended beyond wood science to brewing technology and popular mycology, while his professional leadership included service as president of the British Mycological Society, the Association of Applied Biologists, and the Institute of Wood Science.

== Early life and education ==
Findlay was born to British parents in New York City. When his family returned to England, he received his education at Sevenoaks School, and at the age of 16 entered Imperial College in London to study botany and mycology. He earned the Associate of the Royal College of Science (A.R.C.S.) in 1923. The following year, he was awarded the Edward Forbes medal and prize by the College. After serving as a demonstrator in the botany department, he carried out research at the Forest Products Research Laboratory of the Imperial College of Science and Technology, where he was awarded the Diploma of Imperial College (DIC.) in 1925. Findlay pursued further studies and was awarded a fellowship by the British Cotton Growing Association in 1926, spending a year at Cambridge, at St. Catharine's College and the Cambridge University School of Agriculture. He later spent several months at the Imperial College of Tropical Agriculture in Trinidad, receiving an associateship of the college (A.I.C.T.A.). He obtained his M.Sc. degree from the University of London in 1932 and his D.Sc. degree from the same institution in 1942.

== Career ==
In 1927, Findlay was appointed as mycologist at the newly opened Forest Products Research Laboratory (F.P.R.L.) of the Department of Scientific and Industrial Research at Princes Risborough, Buckinghamshire. There, he worked with Kenneth St George Cartwright, who also worked as a professor at Imperial College. Together they conducted extensive research and developed a profound understanding of organisms associated with wood rot, from forest pathology to those affecting long-term durability of wood in service. This collaborative work resulted in the publication of their seminal text, "Decay of Timber and its Prevention", first published in 1935, with a revised and updated second edition following about twenty years later. Following Cartwright's retirement, Findlay took over the mycology Section of the F.P.R.L. where he managed a team of researchers and continued his prolific scientific publishing in journals, technical periodicals, and trade press. By 1958, he had been granted his D.Sc. degree and enjoyed a distinguished career in wood science. In 1958, Findlay accepted the position of assistant director of the Brewing Industry Research Foundation at Nutfield, Surrey, where he worked until his retirement in 1969, while also maintaining a consulting practice until the end of his career.

== Publications and contributions ==
Throughout his career, Findlay authored or edited numerous scientific books. Among these were "Preservation of Timber in the Tropics" (1985), "Modern Brewing Technology, Dry Rot and Other Timber Troubles", "Diseases of Trees Caused by Wood-Destroying Fungi", and "The Observer's Book of Mushrooms". He also published a popular book titled "Fungi: Folklore, Fiction and Fact", written in a highly readable style whilst remaining scientifically accurate and informative. Findlay's chief scientific textbook, "Decay of Timber and its Prevention", documented and explained the then-recent discoveries of soft-rot in the cellulose of wood and remained a primary reference on the subject for many years.

== Professional activities and honours ==
Findlay was an active member of various scientific societies throughout his career. He served as president of the British Mycological Society in 1949 and was elected an honorary member in 1983. He was a fellow of the Institute of Biology and of the Institute of Wood Science, and served at various times as President of the Association of Applied Biologists, of which he had been general secretary for many years. He was also President of the Institute of Wood Science. At the time of his death, he was a co-opted member of the Council of the British Wood Preserving Association and a chief examiner for the examination of Timber Infestation Surveyors of the Institute of Wood Science. In addition to his scientific endeavours, Findlay served on the Surrey County Council for some years.

== Personal life ==
Despite his busy professional life, Findlay maintained diverse interests including forestry and fungi. He was an enthusiastic educator who mentored many young research workers early in their careers. An accomplished linguist, he was fluent in French and moderately skilled in German, which facilitated his extensive travels across Europe and participation in international research collaborations, particularly with the International Research Group on Wood Preservation (I.R.G.). Findlay died suddenly on 18 December 1985 in Harewood Forest after a walk with his son and a friend, a peaceful end that was considered fitting for a man of his character and accomplishments. He was survived by his widow, three children, five grandchildren and numerous friends.

== Selected publications ==
Journal articles

- Findlay, W.P.K. (1947). "The use of perforated cards for preliminary identification of fungi". Transactions of the British Mycological Society. 31 (1–2): 106–111. doi:10.1016/s0007-1536(47)80012-9.
- Findlay, W.P.K. (1951). "Tree and timber fungi". Transactions of the British Mycological Society. 33 (3–4): 195–208. doi:10.1016/s0007-1536(50)80075-x.
- Findlay, W.P.K. (1951). "A note on the fungi of less common occurrence in houses". Transactions of the British Mycological Society. 34 (1): 35–57. doi:10.1016/s0007-1536(51)80026-3.
- Findlay, W.P.K. (1965). "Kenneth St George Cartwright 1891—1964". Transactions of the British Mycological Society. 48 (1): 151. doi:10.1016/s0007-1536(65)80020-1.
- Findlay, W.P.K. (1971). "A rare fungus on yew". Bulletin of the British Mycological Society. 5 (1): 4.

Books

- Cartwright, Kenneth St George; Findlay, Walter Philip Kennedy (1946). Decay of Timber and Its Prevention. London: H.M. Stationery Office; vi+294 pages. 1950 reprint. Brooklyn, N.Y.: Chemical Publishing Co. 2nd edition. 1958; xv+332 pages
- Findlay, W.P.K. (1953). Dry Rot and Other Timber Troubles. 267 pp.
- Findlay, W.P.K. (1967). The Wayside and Woodland Fungi. 202 pp. ISBN 978-0723200086
- Findlay, W.P.K. (1971). Modern Brewing Technology. 384 pp. ISBN 978-0333124635
- Findlay, W.P.K. (1975). Timber Properties and Uses. 224 pp. ISBN 978-0258969212
- Findlay, W.P.K. (1977). The Observer's Book of Mushrooms. 192 pp. ISBN 978-0723215653
- Findlay, W.P.K. (1982). Fungi: Folklore, Fiction and Fact. 112 pp. ISBN 978-0855462000
- Findlay, W.P.K. (1985). Preservation of Timber in the Tropics. 273 pp. ISBN 978-90-247-3112-1

== See also ==
- List of mycologists
