= Brian Gomm =

English cricketer and footballer

Personal information
- Full name: Brian Arthur Gomm
- Born: 24 June 1918; Castle Cary, England
- Died: 23 April 1995 (aged 76); Peterborough, England
- Batting: Right-handed
- Bowling: Left-arm medium pace

Domestic team information
- Years: Team
- 1939: Somerset

Career statistics
Competition	FC
Matches	2
Runs scored	7
Batting average	2.33
100s/50s	0/0
Top score	5
Balls bowled	24
Wickets	0
Bowling average	–
5 wickets in innings	–
10 wickets in match	–
Best bowling	0/21
Catches/stumpings	2/–
- Source: CricketArchive, 22 December 2015

Brian Arthur Gomm (24 June 1918 – 23 April 1995) was an English cricketer and footballer who made two first-class cricket appearances for Somerset in 1939 and played football for Yeovil in 1936-39 and for West Bromwich Albion in 1939 and 1945/46. He had amateur status in both sports.

== Early life ==
Born at Castle Cary, Gomm attended Sexey's School, Bruton, where he distinguished himself as an athlete, and subsequently studied physical education at Dudley Training College and Carnegie College, Leeds.

== Cricket career ==
He played cricket for Frome and Men o'Mendip and made "some substantial scores" as a right-handed batsman in the Somerset second team before being selected for the county's first eleven.

He made his first-class debut against Essex at Wells in July 1939, batting at No. 8 in Somerset's first innings and at No. 4 in their second. In a very low-scoring game, in which Somerset's two innings only totalled 123 runs, he made 0 and 5, but he was effective in the field, attracting attention early on with a "lightning throw-in" that resulted in the run-out of the Essex opener Laurie Eastman. In Somerset's next match, against Northamptonshire at Northampton, he batted at No. 9 and scored 2, but was not called upon in the second innings. A left-arm medium-pacer, he bowled three eight-ball overs without success.

By the time of his selection for Somerset's first eleven, he was in training with the Militia at Catterick, having been conscripted after the Munich Crisis. He was released to play in the Essex and Northamptonshire matches at Somerset's request, agreed to forfeit all other leave during his six months' training, and received the accolade of being "the first Militiaman to play first-class cricket".

Following his return to England in 1945, he played for West Bromwich Dartmouth when the club won the First Division championship in the Birmingham Cricket League for the fifth successive year. His unbeaten 63 made a key contribution to the club's victory over Walsall but was somewhat eclipsed by Eric Hollies' bowling figures of 9 for 62.

In 1949 and 1950, he played in non-first-class matches for the Army, as a batsman only, scoring 84 in one innings against the Royal Air Force at Lord's.

== Football career ==
In 1935-6, Gomm played centre-forward for Shepton Mallet Town Football Club. At the outset of the 1936-7 season, when he was due to proceed to Dudley Training College, he was signed by Yeovil Town (then called Yeovil and Petters United), subsequently playing in several Southern and Western League games for the club.

At Dudley, he captained the college's soccer team and, later based at Smethwick, began playing for West Bromwich Albion in Central League matches. He was a member of Corinthian F.C. by 1938 and, after the merger with Casuals F.C., played for the club in the Isthmian League. He was due to tour Greece with the club at Easter 1939, but the uncertain political situation resulted in the tour's abandonment had it proceeded, he would not have played in Yeovil's match against Norwich City Reserves, during which he sustained a leg injury that terminated his football for the season.

He was first capped by the Somerset County Football Association in 1937 and recommended by its council for consideration in the following year when an English amateur international team was selected. Probably as a consequence, he was included in the Football Association Amateur XI, which played the Royal Air Force at Cranwell in December that year. In January 1939, he also played for Yorkshire Amateur A.F.C. in an FA Amateur Cup fixture.

After a war-imposed interval, he resumed football at Birmingham in the autumn of 1945. He had been "scoring freely for the reserves" (including a hat-trick against Derby) when he was promoted to lead West Bromwich's first team as centre-forward against Luton in December. He again opened the attack in the match against Arsenal in January 1946 but, after a disappointing start to the game, was moved to play outside-right after half-time. He was next due to play centre-forward in the FA Cup match against Fulham but had to withdraw due to an injury suffered while playing in an Army mid-week fixture (Southern Command v A.A.Command, in which he had scored all four of the victorious Southern's goals). He last appeared for the West Bromwich first team against Plymouth Argyle in February, scoring once.

Playing for the Army Crusaders against the Cambridge University Falcons in February 1954, he delivered a hat-trick that failed to avert the Crusaders' 3-6 defeat.

== Military and business career ==
Gomm was a Second Lieutenant in the Royal Corps of Signals, attached to the Indian Signal Corps in 1941; he was a Lieutenant, acting Captain, when mentioned in despatches in June 1942, but was a prisoner of war in Italy by the end of that year. Promoted substantive Captain in 1946 and Major in 1953, he retired in the latter rank in 1955.

On leaving military service, he became one of several ex-Army officers recruited to work for Perkins Engines by its chairman, Sir Montague Prichard, who believed that experience in strategic planning and leadership were key credentials for success in commercial management. He was given charge of Perkins' South African subsidiary in 1957 and subsequently served as general sales manager for several of the Group's European regions.
