= Joan Moore (phytopathologist) =

British botanist (1920–1986)

F. Joan Moore, c. 1978

Frances Joan Harvey Moore, OBE (known as Joan Moore; 1920 – 28 February 1986) was a British plant pathologist, science administrator and conservationist.

== Early life and education ==
Moore went to the City of London School for Girls and Maynard School, Exeter. She attended the University College of the South West (later the University of Exeter) for a year, and in 1940 went to University College London, which had relocated to Bangor during the Second World War. She graduated in botany with an upper second in 1942.

== Career ==
Moore joined the Rothamsted Experimental Station in Harpenden, Hertfordshire, as a plant pathologist immediately after graduation, at first as a voluntary assistant, joining the staff in 1944. She initially worked on eyespot disease of wheat under Mary Dilys Glynne. She then worked under S. D. Garrett on fungal rot affecting stored potatoes, receiving a PhD from Imperial College, University of London, in 1945 for this work. Her thesis was entitled "Investigations on the fungi isolated from rotting potato tubers". After completing her PhD, she returned to research under Glynne on wheat eyespot, showing that the disease had become widely distributed in the UK.

Her focus turned to administration, and in 1947 she moved to the Ministry of Agriculture Plant Pathology Laboratory, also in Harpenden, under W. C. Moore (1900–1967), as assistant mycologist and, from 1948, mycologist to the government. In this role, Moore worked across diverse areas, including the diagnosis of plant disease, seed pathology and potato wart disease, as well as guiding government policy on such matters as the import and export of plants. In 1951, as Secretary of the laboratory's Publications Sub-Committee, she was involved in the foundation of the journal Plant Pathology. She became head of the Plant Disease Assessment Section in 1964. In this role, she guided global policy on assessing disease in plants via advising the United Nations.

In 1973, she obtained a senior position within the newly created Chief Scientist's Group at the Ministry of Agriculture and Fisheries headquarters in London, where she managed ministry-funded research on arable crops and plant sciences. She retired in 1980 or 1981, and was appointed an OBE.

Moore was an active member of the Association of Applied Biologists, the Institute of Biology, and the British Mycological Society, serving as president of the British Mycological Society in 1978. She was one of the founding members of the British Society for Plant Pathology, and helped to establish the Federation of British Plant Pathologists. She served on various committees of the National Institute of Agricultural Botany from 1965, holding a position on its council from 1980 until her death. During her retirement she also worked on administering research into grassland for the Natural Environment Research Council institutes. From 1983, she chaired the UK Cereal Pathogen Virulence Survey.

== Personal life ==
Moore lived for her entire adult life in Harpenden, where she was active in conservation of Harpenden Common. She was a keen gardener, and served as Honorary Vice-President of the Harpenden Horticultural Society. She never married, living until 1981 with her widowed mother.

She died on 28 February 1986, in London.
