= Gerald Wilkinson =

British author and illustrator

Gerald Sedgewick Wilkinson, FLS (9 February 1926 – 10 March 1988) was a British illustrator, art historian, naturalist, photographer, artist and book-designer, known for his books on J. M. W. Turner's sketches and on British trees and woodlands. Though there had been many sections on the genus Ulmus in books and journals, Wilkinson's monograph, Epitaph for the Elm (1978), written for the general reader and illustrated in colour, was the first such book to be published in the UK.

== Life and work ==
Wilkinson was born 9 February 1926 in Wigan and attended Wigan Grammar School and Manchester School of Art, where he studied lettering (a subject on which he later lectured) and took a Diploma in Art, specialising in Mural Painting (1947). In the 1950s his illustrations were reproduced in Arts Council posters and in The Penrose Annual (1955). He turned to research on Turner's sketches, publishing studies in 1972, 1974, 1975 and 1982. Karl Kroeber listed Wilkinson's Turner's Early Sketchbooks (1972) as one of the best collections of reproductions of Turner's works. "The images were substantially enriched by the pioneering spirit of Wilkinson's text," wrote Ian Warrell (2014), "which analysed countless sketches that had previously received barely any critical attention."

Wilkinson, however, later described himself (1978) as "interested above all in landscape", an interest that led to his second reputation, as a specialist in British trees and woodlands, a subject he treated in a number of books. These included a guide to the trees of Britain, Trees in the Wild (1975), and a monograph on elms, elegiac in tone, published at the height of the Dutch elm disease pandemic, Epitaph for the Elm (1978), containing his own illustrations and photographs (one of the latter appeared on the cover of the Sunday Times Magazine, 14 May 1978). Epitaph ranged over literature, history, folklore and botany, and included chapters on the elm in art (among them paintings by John Constable) and poetry (with poems by John Clare, Edward Thomas and John Betjeman). The book was also notable for its championing of Plot elm, which Wilkinson regarded as a beautiful tree neglected by conservationists: "Unhappily," he wrote, "the plumes of Ulmus plotii are no longer a common feature of the landscape of the Trent above Newark and the Witham above Lincoln. Elms are now [1978] few in these areas that were once the home of Plot elm. A wartime shortage of wood, altered drainage levels, land clearance for power stations, and machine farming have all combined into the familiar pattern of short-term efficiency and long-term degradation." He asked readers to let him know of any surviving specimens.

Wilkinson's region-by-region guides to British Woodland Walks were published in association with the Ordnance Survey in the 1980s. Dendrologist Archie Miles, author of Silva (1999), The Trees that Made Britain (2006), and Hidden Trees of Britain (2007), paid tribute to Wilkinson's "knowledge and style":

Wilkinson tells it the way it is. He is knowledgeable about woodland culture and history, often moved by beauty, but, equally, he is scathing about insensitive planting, threats of urban sprawl, human detritus and silly signs. It's his Woodland Walks (1985) to which I return repeatedly.

Woodland Walks comments on some 780 woods, copses, forests, heaths, plantations, parks and arboreta in Britain, all visited in person, with entries ranging from a few lines, for example on Wilkinson's Wood, (Note: No connection with author's family.) NT, Nether Wasdale, Cumbria,

Disturbingly, I found this to be a wood almost without trees. A great part has been planted with larch, and I find this unacceptable. It would have been better to leave it alone.

to several pages for such notables as Hatfield Forest and Forest of Dean. Wilkinson contributed photographs and articles to The AA Book of the Countryside (1973) and to Tebbs' Trees of the British Isles (1984). The Turner books and Woodland Walks in Britain were also published in the US.

Wilkinson was elected a Fellow of the Linnean Society of London on 17 May 1977. He married the illustrator Jill Gardiner, who contributed line-drawings to his Trees in the Wild. They had three children and lived in Oxfordshire. After his death in a road accident near Culham on 10 March 1988, the Reading Evening Post wrote, "His work as a painter was much appreciated and his paintings had been exhibited, sold and were sought after."

== Publications ==
=== Art history ===
- Turner's Early Sketchbooks: Drawings in England, Wales and Scotland from 1789 to 1802; Selected, with notes (1972)
- The Sketches of Turner, R.A., 1802–20: Genius of the Romantic (UK) [Romantic Genius (US)] (1974)
- Turner's Colour Sketches, 1820–34 (1975)

"I do not remember when books have given me so much pleasure... Thank heaven for someone who looks at the drawings like an artist, and not as a pedant."
― Sir Kenneth Clark, 1974, on Wilkinson's Turner's Early Sketchbooks and Sketches of Turner, R.A...

- Turner Sketches, 1789-1820 (London, 1977); a revised edition of the 1972 and 1974 volumes, in a smaller, single-volume format
- Turner on Landscape: The Liber Studiorum (1982)

A planned fourth volume on the sketches, covering the final years of Turner's career, was left unfinished at Wilkinson's death.

=== Natural history ===
- Trees in the wild, and other trees and shrubs (1975)
- Epitaph for the Elm (1978)
- A History of Britain's Trees (1981)
- Woodland Walks in Britain (1985)
- Ordnance Survey Woodland Walks (1985)
- Ordnance Survey Woodland Walks in South East England (1986)
- Ordnance Survey Woodland Walks in South-West England (1986)
- Ordnance Survey Woodland Walks: East Central England (1986)
- Ordnance Survey Woodland Walks: Central England (1986)
- Ordnance Survey Woodland Walks in the North of England (1986)
- Ordnance Survey Woodland Walks: Wales and the Marches (1986)
- Ordnance Survey Woodland Walks: Scotland (1986)
