= Sexey's School =

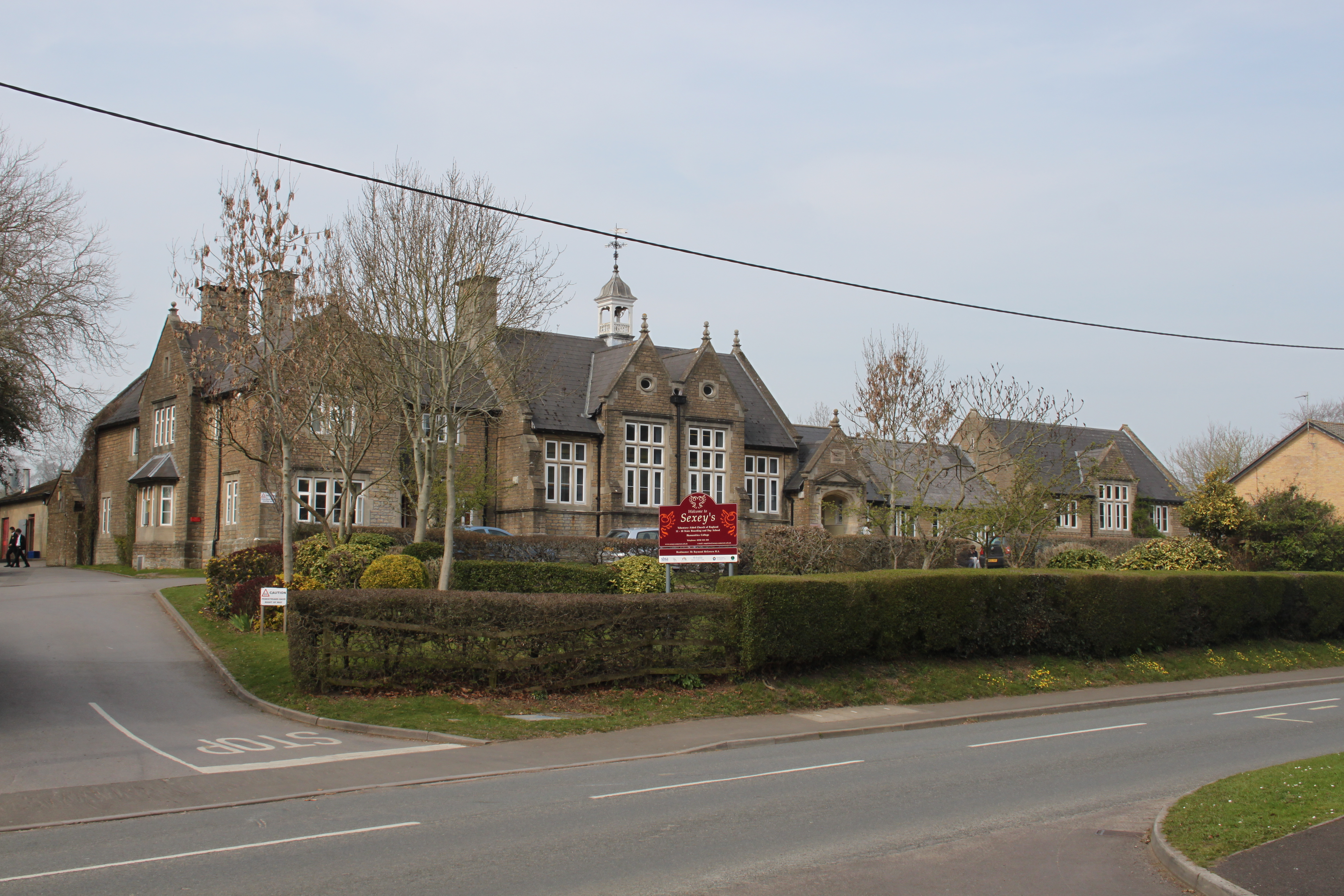

Location
- Cole Road; Bruton, Somerset, BA10 0DF; England; 51.1053°N 2.4632°W

Information
- Type: Academy; Day and boarding school
- Motto: Coniuncti Perficimus (Latin for Together We Achieve)
- Religious affiliation: Church of England
- Established: 1891; 135 years ago
- Department for Education URN: 137313 Tables
- Ofsted: Reports
- Head teacher: Steve Clayson
- Age: 11 to 18
- Enrolment: 665 pupils
- Capacity: 602
- Colours: Burgundy, gold and black
- Website: www.sexeys.somerset.sch.uk

Sexey's School is a Church of England, co-educational state boarding and day school in Bruton, Somerset, England for 11-18 year olds. Sexey's School is named after Hugh Sexey who, in 1599, was appointed as a Royal auditor to Elizabeth I and later as a Royal auditor to James I. Sexey's Hospital was established in 1619 from the proceeds of his will, and the school was founded in 1889. State boarding schools are most unusual in England and Wales. The school became an academy in August 2011.

== History ==
Sexey's School dates back to a trade school which opened on 6 April 1891 with 15 boys. The first Head Master was William Albert Knight. The Head Master and the boys moved into temporary premises in a house known as 'The Glen' on Quaperlake Street in Bruton. At the end of its first year there were 40 boys at the school learning basic subjects including practical mechanics, land measuring and elementary science. The school was moved to its current site in 1892 in new buildings designed by Norwich-based architect George Skipper. The new buildings were formally opened on 19 April 1892.

As headmaster, William A. Knight emphasized science. His students include the outstanding British biologists, L. J. F. Brimble, Frederick Tom Brooks, Ralph Warren Marsh, and Walter Cecil Moore.

Sexey's was a grammar school until the Education Act 1944, after which it became a Voluntary Controlled school. In 1991 it adopted Grant Maintained status and in September 1999 it became a Voluntary Aided school.

It remained an all-boys school until 1977 when it became fully co-educational. Boarding facilities were expanded in the 1980s with the building of two new boarding houses – Lisbury House and Coombe House – making Sexey's one of the largest schools of its type in the country. The school has continued expansion with the introduction of a policy in 2003 to take day pupils from a local catchment area of 1.5 miles. Prior to this the last day pupil was admitted in 1983. In 2001 the school had 394 pupils. In 2007 there were 512 pupils.

As a state boarding (and day) school, Sexey's has complex funding arrangements with both state (government funded) and independent income (for the boarding facilities).

In 2013 the then Secretary of State for Education, Michael Gove, described Sexey's as "one of the most outstanding schools in the country," during an interview on the Andrew Marr Show on BBC One.

In 2019 two catering managers were convicted of defrauding the school of over £16,000.

In 2019, after a number of poor Ofsted results and on the recommendation of the Regional Schools Commissioner, the school considered merging into the Sherborne Area Schools' Trust multi-academy trust. But following extensive parental engagement by Sexey's parents, governors and government representatives who were in opposition to the move, the Sherborne Trust decided not to proceed, stating there was "not an alignment of values or partnership working with Sexey's". The Regional Schools Commissioner considered what the next step should be. Ofsted inspection visits in 2020 and 2021 found that leaders and those responsible for governance were taking effective remedial action.

The school has two Ofsted 'Good' results, one for boarding (social care) and one for education. The report in January 2023 raised the school’s education grading to ‘good’ in all five areas of the inspection framework and is the third ‘good’ report the school has received following their Ofsted Social Care and SIAMS judgement.

Inspectors said that “Pupils thrive at Sexey’s School. They are happy and safe. Staff know them well as individuals. Pupils recognise and appreciate this” and that “the school has high academic expectations of all pupils. Staff start from the position that all pupils can succeed.”

== Boarding ==
Around one fifth of the school are boarders. There are three boarding houses:

- Macmillan House, Opened 2011, is a new £3.5 m installation replacing Walwin House. Its name is a tribute to Douglas MacMillan who was an old boy of the school (Old Sexeian) and founded MacMillan Cancer Support.
- Coombe House, opened 1983. Coombe has capacity for around 40 boarders at present and is undergoing refurbishment.
- Lisbury House, opened 1983. Lisbury was refurbished in 2024 and houses around 80 boarders.

Former boarding houses include:

- Walwin House (formerly Junior House) was two houses built in the late 1930s. Walwin House used to accommodate year 7 boarders and had the capacity for 49 children – 30 boys and 19 girls.
- Cliff House, a Grade II listed building built by Thomas Hannam in 1820 opened as a boarding house in 1892. It used to takes boarders in all year groups but is now used for teaching and holiday lets.

== Headteachers ==
- William Albert Knight (1891–1927)
- Wallace E. Page (1927–1955)
- William R. Towns (1955–1965)
- Norman S. Roberts (1965–1970)
- David Curtis (1970–1980)
- John Lello (1980–1989)
- David Charman (1989–1995)
- Mike Chapman (Acting Head)1995
- Stephen Burgoyne (1996–2007)
- Raymond McGovern (2008–2013)
- Jean Hopegood (Acting Head) 2013
- Irfan Latif (2013–2017)
- Gill Kelly (Interim Head) (2017–2018)
- Helen Cullen (2018–2024)
- Aaron Reid (Interim Executive Head) (2024-2025)
- Steve Clayson (2025–Present)

== 2002 calendar ==
In 2001, a group of pupils produced a glossy calendar as part of a Young Enterprise business project, sold for charity, called "Sexey's Hot Twelve", that featured 12 pictures of boys and girls in seductive poses. Child protection groups criticised the calendar for its potential attraction to adults who prey on vulnerable young people. The school reported that they had received no complaints, and that most of the 500 copies were bought immediately after going on sale.

== Notable former pupils ==
- Craig Alcock, footballer
- L. J. F. Brimble, botanist and editor of Nature magazine
- Frederick Tom Brooks, botanist, professor of botany, Cambridge University, attended 1895–1898
- John Bryant, journalist (editor in chief of the Telegraph titles) and marathon runner
- Tim Burt, geographer, academic, and academic administrator
- Harry Cobden, jockey
- Lucy Giles, army officer and college commander at the Royal Military Academy Sandhurst
- Brian Gomm, amateur cricketer and footballer
- Douglas Macmillan, founder of Macmillan Cancer Support
- Hubert Phillips, economist, broadcaster, journalist, author, bridge player and organiser
- David Read, biologist, vice president and biological secretary of the Royal Society
- Harold Scott, commissioner of the Metropolitan Police, 1945–1953
- Ned Sherrin, broadcaster, author and stage director, 1931–2007
- Alex Tew, entrepreneur
- Nigel Vincent, linguist and academic
- Arthur Willis, botanist and editor

== Notable former staff ==
- Charles Edward Moss — botanist, science master at Sexey's in 1901
