= Hugh Sexey =

English royal auditor

- Born: c. 1540; Bruton, Somerset, Kingdom of England
- Died: 1619

Hugh Sexey (died 1619) was an English royal auditor.

== Career ==
He was born near Bruton, Somerset, England. A baptism of a 'Hugh' is recorded in Bruton Parish Church on 18 November 1556 and early twentieth century scholars had suggested this was Sexey. However records of land conveyance suggest his birth may have been c. 1540. Hugh Sexey attended Bruton Grammar School. Although Sexey received some education, mainly in Latin, probably at the local Free School (now King’s School), he was apparently largely self-taught and, despite his humble origins, rose to important government positions.

By the age of 43 he had been appointed as royal auditor of the Exchequer to Queen Elizabeth I and later King James I. Through these influential positions Sexey's wealth increased, as he gained a fortune mainly through fees, revenues, property dealings and money lending. During his life he undertook many charitable activities in the Bruton area and to ensure these continued after his death most of his estate was transferred to twelve trustees in 1616.

After his death the trustees of his will established Sexey's Hospital in Bruton as an institution to care for the elderly. This included the site of Sexey's School, which still exists today. Also founded was Hugh Sexey Middle School in Blackford near Wedmore.

According to John Chamberlain, in October 1619 Sir Garrat Samms opened negotiations to marry Sexey's widow.
