= Charles Edward Moss =

English-born South African botanist

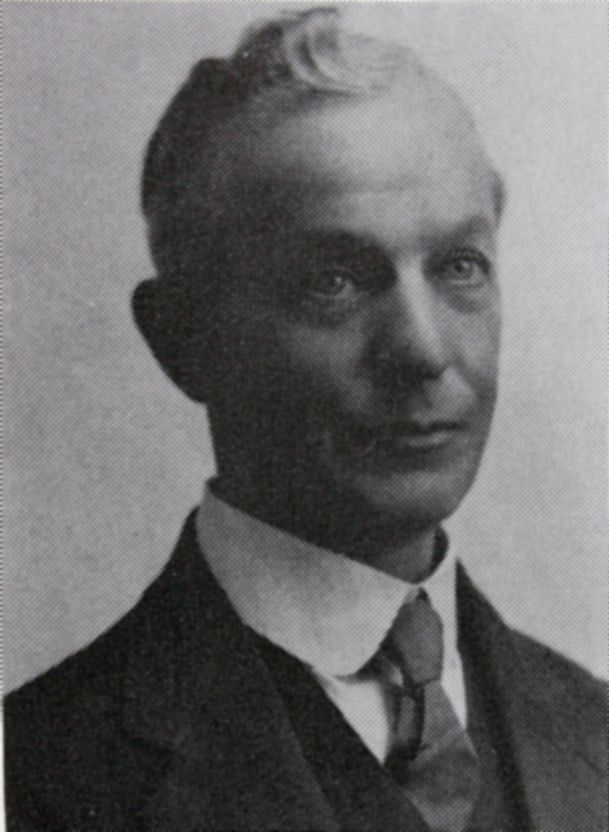
Charles Edward Moss (c.1900)

Charles Edward Moss (February 7, 1870 Hyde, Cheshire, England – November 11, 1930 Johannesburg, South Africa), was an English-born South African botanist, the youngest son of a nonconformist minister, and the editor of the first two parts of The Cambridge British Flora published in 1914 and 1920. The Cambridge British Flora, under the editorship of Moss, was intended to be a ten-volume survey of the flora of Britain, with contributions by specialists in particular genera. After two volumes the project was abandoned.

== Early education ==
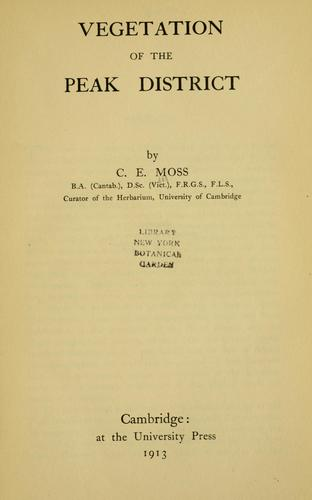

Moss developed an interest in botany in 1893 when, recovering from a pulmonary abscess, he was advised to go on long outdoor rambles. These took place over the Halifax moors, sometimes in the company of botanists belonging to the Halifax Scientific Society, a society in which he soon became a prominent member. He enrolled as a Queen's Scholar, at Yorkshire College, Leeds in 1895, which at that time was still part of Victoria University, Leeds, and was a part-time editor of the Halifax Naturalist, publishing a number of his own botanical papers. 1898 saw him working at Fairweather Green School, though still keeping in touch with Yorkshire College by assisting William Gardner Smith (1866-1928) in mapping the vegetation of West Riding. In 1901 he was appointed assistant master at Sexey's School in Bruton, where he started studying the vegetation of the area. 1902 found him lecturing in biology at Manchester Municipal Training College. He became a member of the Central Committee for the Survey and Study of British Vegetation which had been started by Arthur Tansley and Smith in 1904, making invaluable contributions.

In 1907 Moss received his doctorate from the University of Manchester and a back bequest from the Royal Geographical Society for a report on the vegetation of the Pennines which he had done during his spare time. He took up the post of Curator of the Herbarium at the University of Cambridge in January 1908. This was the point at which his interests turned to taxonomy. At Cambridge he headed field expeditions and lectured, his lectures being described as "not brilliant ... but full of sense and philosophy". It wasn't long before he conceived the idea of writing a new 'student's Flora' of the British Isles.

== Edward Walter Hunnybun ==
Edward Walter Hunnybun (1848-1918), a Huntingdon solicitor and amateur botanical artist, decided to embark on a project depicting all the species of the British flora. He was not a skilled taxonomist, but his supporting network of advisors made up of botanists and collectors ensured that he portrayed representative and correctly identified specimens. The possibility arose of producing a volume of the drawings, something made more likely by an exhibition of some of his drawings at the Linnean Society. Although of considerable artistic merit, George Claridge Druce (Moss' counterpart at Oxford) criticised them for being scientifically inadequate and lacking in detail. By 1909 the drawings had been donated to the Cambridge University Botany School and were in Moss' possession, who disagreed with Druce about the quality of Hunnybun's work and mulled over producing a student's flora based on the images, an idea which later turned into the much bolder notion of producing a Flora of the British Isles. Moss obtained approval and financial support for the project from the Cambridge University Press and set about gathering contributions from the various specialists. His peremptory manner and high standards, leading to an outright rejection of some manuscripts, resulted in a number of bruised personalities. In January 1912 an agreement was signed giving Moss sole authorship rights for the project. In March 1912 a meeting of potential contributors at the British Museum (Natural History) left Moss firmly in charge, lauded for "his clearness of view and botanical ability", and left a disgruntled Druce complaining about "Germanising our flora" because of plans to use the Engler System for the proposed Flora. Moss had grandiose visions about the structure of the Flora, intending to include not only descriptions, maps and photographs, but also Hunnybun's plates. His ideas ended in a conflict with the Press, so that in 1913 a debate arose as to whether the plates should interleave with the text or be published separately. Albert Seward, Professor of Botany at Cambridge and a Syndic at the Press, supported Moss, but both eventually reluctantly accepted the Press's preferences.

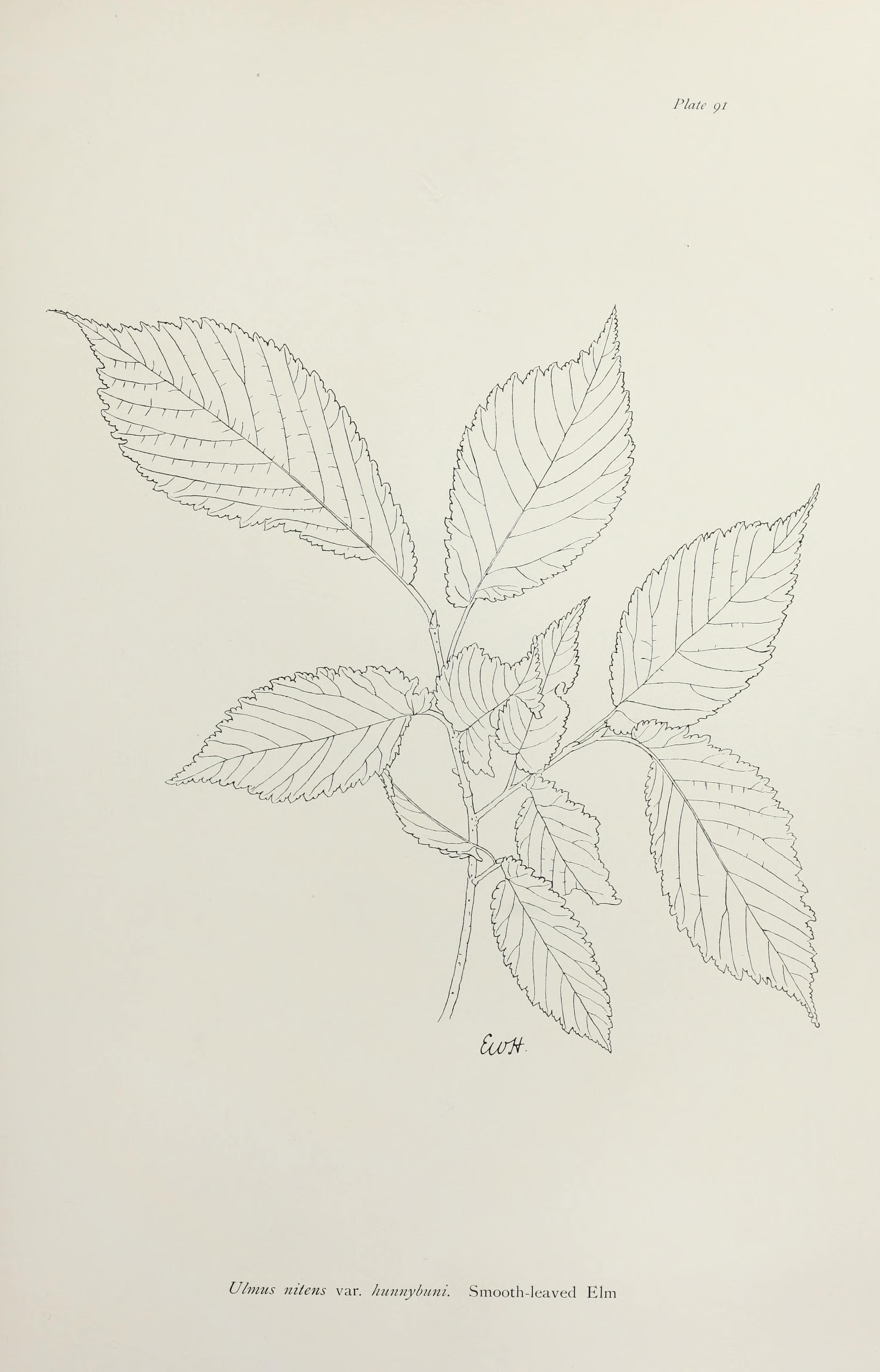
Ulmus nitens var. hunnybunii, by E. W. Hunnybun

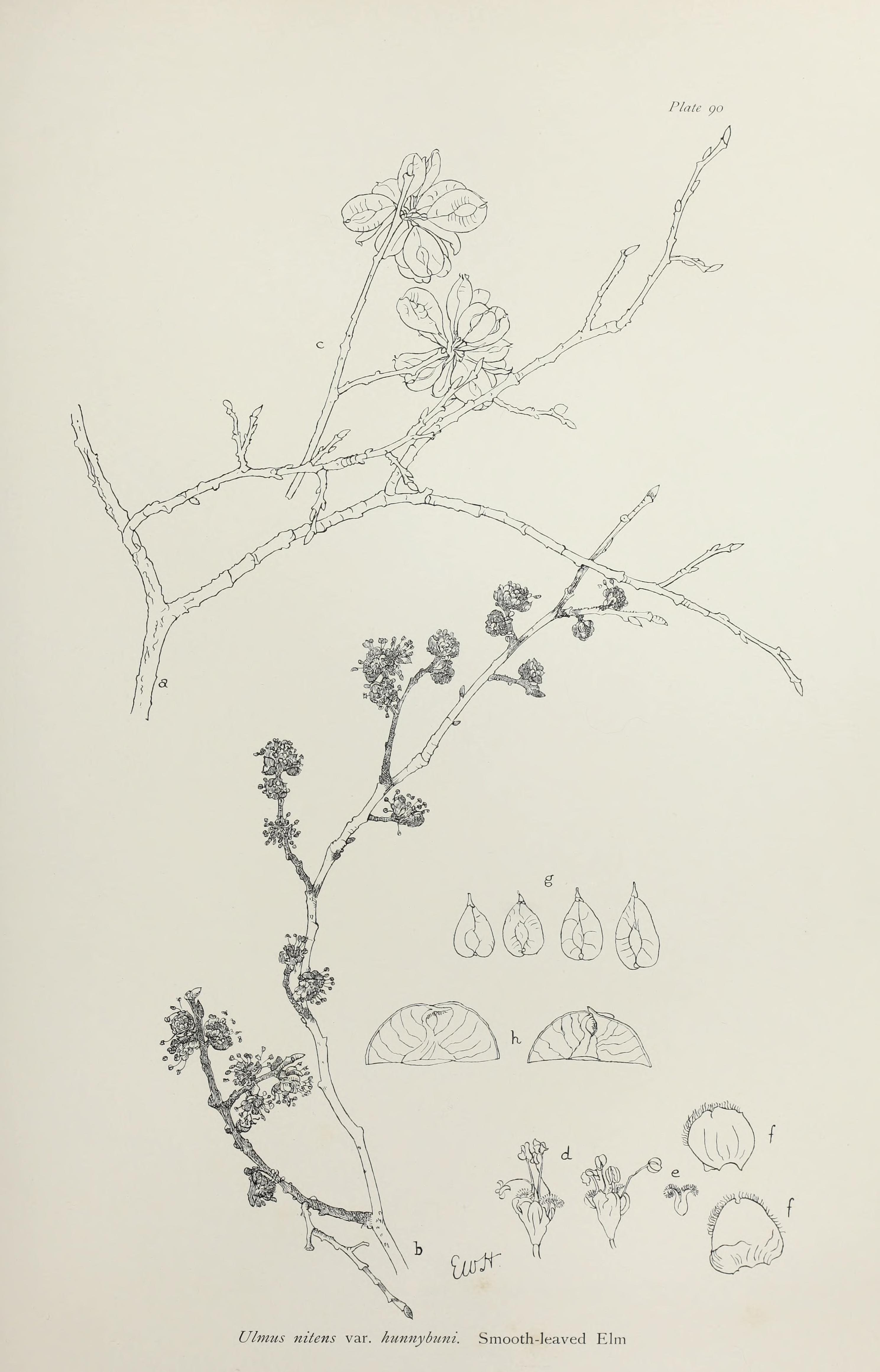
Flowers and fruit of 'Hunnybunii', by Hunnybun

== Volume II ==
In 1914 volume II (Salicaceae to Chenopodiaceae) was the first to be published. In the introduction Moss explained the nomenclature and classification he had used. Despite having turned to botany only six years earlier, Moss displayed a remarkable grasp of the literature of the period, particularly when taking into account that a considerable portion had been written in German. He ignored the 1905 recommendation of the Vienna International Botanical Congress by using lower case initial letters for all specific names (e.g. Hieracium leyi, not Hieracium Leyi) - Moss' way eventually becoming standard practice since it simplified a complex morass of conventions. The text was widely praised, whereas the drawings came in for a lot of criticism. The reproduction technique used had not been kind to the delicacy of Hunnybun's drawings while some of his small illustrations were sometimes lost on the generous page size of 36 by 26 centimetres (14 in × 10 in).

As a result of a meeting held on 12 January 1915, the Press, under financial strain due to World War I, was deliberately delaying the publication of further volumes of the Flora, which had originally been planned as annual issues. Moss was also being held partly accountable and was facing legal action for the costs incurred by having replacement plates made for those he had rejected as inadequate. To aggravate matters even further salaries of all teaching staff in the Botany School had been reduced by 10%. Moss wanted to contribute to the war effort, and did so by training recruits in the Officers' Training Corps and later working in a munitions factory.

== Emigration to South Africa ==
Moss' personal life reached a new low in 1916 with the dissolution of his marriage. The scandal of his wife's infidelity rocked Cambridge society. Mrs Wedgwood, a friend of the family, wrote "it is difficult for us to put ourselves into his [Moss'] position - Mrs Moss entirely deceived me, she had no marks of the seductress about her". Embittered and under immense stress, Moss and his young daughter Beatrice left on the Balmoral Castle for South Africa in 1917, where he took up the newly created post of Professor of Botany at the South African School of Mines and Technology in Johannesburg. Here he applied himself to a study of the Transvaal flora and laid the groundwork for the Witwatersrand University's herbarium, later named the Moss Herbarium in his honour.

== Volume III ==
Moss appointed one of his former students, A. J. Wilmott, to supervise volume III through its publication, and though now in South Africa, he still felt committed to the project and wrote a number of letters spelling out details to be observed. By 1918 his correspondence suggested that he was considering a return to Cambridge. A letter written by Seward expressed an aversion to this idea, because of Moss' having broken his contract. Seward also had doubts about the viability of the series. Volume III was published in 1920, Wilmott finding the task far greater than he had anticipated. Its cost of £6 lSs 0d was thrice that of volume II, while the sum budgeted for each volume had almost quadrupled. Included in the introduction was a caustic criticism of James Britten following a long-standing difference of opinion between them on nomenclature.

In 1921 Moss married a fellow Witwatersrand University staff member, later becoming head of the department, and underscoring his ties to his new life.

== Demise of project ==
By 1923 the Press had decided that the work "should not proceed under the current contract". Moss was indignant with this decision, but the Press remained adamant, insisting on tighter rules or abandoning the project. Moss was given the option of complying with more stringent requirements or accepting compensation. He eventually accepted the financial offer of "£150, plus a further sum of £80 in respect of out-of-pocket expenses, in full discharge of any claim against the Syndics in respect of the agreement for the publication of The Cambridge British Flora".

== Relationship to Frank Fraser Darling ==
Moss was possibly also related to the British ecologist and conservationist Frank Fraser Darling. Darling did not know his father, Frank Moss, and was brought up by his mother. Darling stated that he learned C. E. Moss was his father's brother in about 1964, and that "the interest to me is the persistence of the ecological slant of mind, in this case not influenced environmentally!".

In 1930, (the year of Charles's death), botanist Nicholas Edward Brown published Mossia, a monotypic genus of flowering plants from Southern Africa belonging to the family Aizoaceae and it was named in Moss's honour.
