= Westerdijk Institute =

Dutch mycology research institute

The Westerdijk Institute, or Westerdijk Fungal Biodiversity Institute, is part of the Royal Netherlands Academy of Arts and Sciences. The institute was renamed on 10 February 2017, after Johanna Westerdijk, the first female professor in the Netherlands and director of the institute from 1907 to 1958. The former name of the institute was CBS-KNAW Fungal Biodiversity Centre or Centraalbureau voor Schimmelcultures (Central Bureau of Fungal Cultures in English). Despite the name change, the collection maintained by the institute is still called the CBS collection and the use of CBS numbers for the strains continues.

The institute is located in Utrecht Science Park, a suburb of Utrecht. Previously it had been located between offices at the university in Delft and in Baarn. CBS was established in 1904 as a collection of living fungi and algae at the Eleventh International Botanical Congress in Vienna. Since 2002 Pedro Willem Crous has been director of CBS as the successor of Dirk van der Mei.

Since its inception, the institute has built one of the world's largest collections of fungi and bacteria. The collection serves as an International standard for microbiologists, ecologists and geneticists.

The institute is roughly divided into two parts: Collection Management and Research. Researchers carry out investigations in taxonomy (biology) and evolutionary biology of fungi; ecological and genomic issues are often involved. The institute also acts as a centre of expertise for questions related to fungi and bacteria from scientists, business, government and the public. The institute also organises courses in general mycology, medical mycology, mycology relating to food and to the built environment. The Institute carries out identifications of microorganisms for third parties and advises on problems caused by fungi and yeasts.

Presently there are eight research groups:

- Applied and Industrial Mycology (Jos Houbraken)
- CBS Culture Collection (Gerard Verkleij)
- Evolutionary Phytopathology (Pedro Crous)
- Fungal Natural Products (Jerome Collemare)
- Fungal Physiology (Ronald de Vries)
- Medical Mycology (Ferry Hagen)
- Software Developments, Algorithmics and Databasing (Vincent Robert)
- Yeast and Basidiomycete Research (Teun Boekhout)

The Westerdijk Institute hosts and manages the Mycobank fungal database, and is responsible for the mycological journals Studies in Mycology, and Fungal Systematics and Evolution (FUSE). In collaboration with the National Herbarium of the Netherlands the mycological journal Persoonia is produced. The institute holds the library of the Dutch Mycological Society and members can consult and borrow books.

CBS employees contribute to data in the Index Fungorum and the Dutch Species Register. CBS Fungal Biodiversity and NCB Naturalis (Dutch Centre for Biodiversity) are setting up joint facilities for DNA Barcoding of organisms in Leiden and Utrecht as part of the project Arise.
