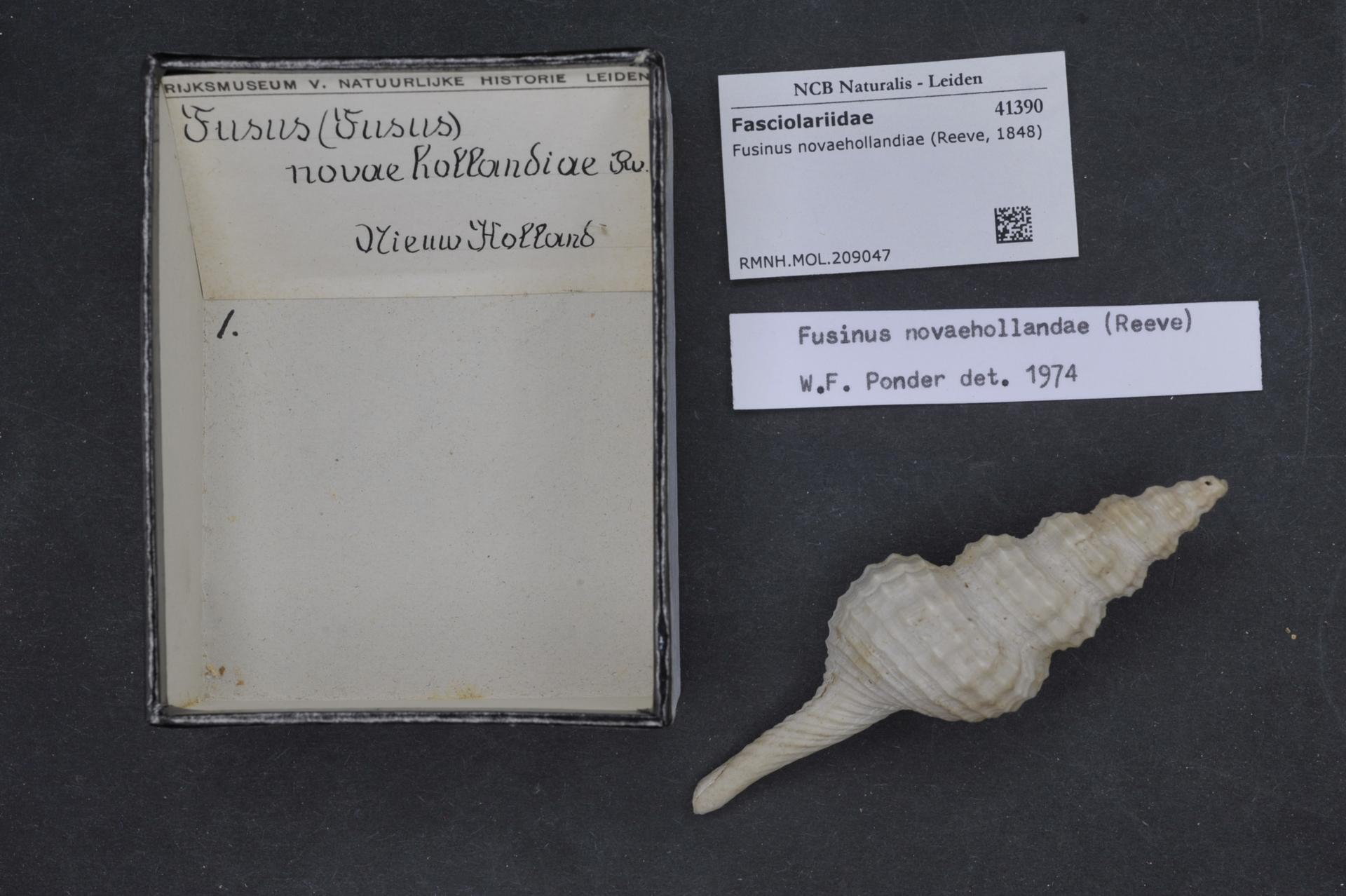
- Specimen of Propefusus novaehollandiae at the Naturalis Biodiversity Center

Scientific classification
- Kingdom: Animalia
- Phylum: Mollusca
- Class: Gastropoda
- Subclass: Caenogastropoda
- Order: Neogastropoda
- Family: Fasciolariidae
- Genus: Propefusus
- Species: P. novaehollandiae

Binomial name
- Propefusus novaehollandiae (Reeve, 1848)

Synonyms
- Fusus novaehollandiae Reeve, 1848

= Propefusus novaehollandiae =

Species of gastropod

Propefusus novaehollandiae is a species of large predatory sea snail, a marine gastropod mollusc in the family Fasciolariidae, the spindle snails and tulip snails.
