= Pedro Willem Crous =

South African mycologist and phytopathologist

- Born: 2 November 1963 (age 62)
- Education: Stellenbosch University; University of the Free State; University of Pretoria
- Scientific career
- Fields: Mycology plant pathology

Pedro Willem Crous (born 2 November 1963) is a South African mycologist and plant pathologist.

== Study ==
In 1985 he obtained a B.Sc. in forestry at the University of Stellenbosch. In 1988 he obtained his M.Sc.Agric. cum laude at the same university. In 1992 he was awarded a Ph.D. in agriculture at the University of the Orange Free State (now called the University of the Free State) in Bloemfontein. In 2009 he was awarded a D.Sc. in fungal systematics at the University of Pretoria (South Africa).

== University of Stellenbosch ==
He was appointed as lecturer at the department of Plant Pathology at Stellenbosch University in 1991, and became a professor in 1995. From 1999 he was the head of the department of Plant Pathology until 2002.

== Westerdijk Fungal Biodiversity Institute ==
In 2002 he accepted the directorship of the Westerdijk Fungal Biodiversity Institute, or in short Westerdijk Institute (then called Centraalbureau voor Schimmelcultures), an Institute of the Royal Netherlands Academy of Arts and Sciences (KNAW) in Utrecht, the Netherlands.

== Awards ==
Crous has received several awards during his career, namely the President's award from the SA Foundation of Research Development (1994), Alexopolous Award from the Mycological Society of America (1999), Havenga Award for Biological Sciences from the SA Academy for Arts and Science (2001), Christiaan Hendrik Persoon Gold Medal from the Southern African Society for Plant Pathology (2005), Founders' Award from the European Mycological Association (2011), Honorary membership of the Mycological Society of America (2012), Elected Fellow of the Southern African Society for Plant Pathology (2013), and Honorary Membership of the Mycological Society of India (2015). He presently has an A1-rating from the National Research Foundation in South Africa, where he supervises students at the University of Pretoria.

== Memberships of scientific organisations, editorships, cooperations and professorships ==
Crous is member of several scientific organisations, including the Mycological Society of America (MSA), The Royal Netherlands Society of Plant Pathology (KNPV), American Phytopathological Society (APS), Australasian Plant Pathology Society, Netherlands Microbiological Society (KNVM), Southern African Society for Plant Pathology, Linnean Society of London, World Federation for Culture Collections, and the International Mycological Association. He was President of the International Mycological Association (2006–2010), and is currently the secretary-general. In 2010 he was elected Corresponding Member of the Royal Academy for Overseas Sciences (Belgium). Together with Jozef Geml he is editor-in-chief of the mycological journal Persoonia, managing editor of Studies in Mycology and IMA Fungus, editor-in-chief of Fungal Systematics and Evolution (FUSE), and associate editor of Australasian Plant Pathology, Sydowia, Fungal Planet, CBS Biodiversity Series, and CBS Laboratory Manual Series. He is a collaborator on the 1000 genome project, and the Tree of Life web project. Crous is appointed as Professor at the University of Stellenbosch, the University of Pretoria and the University of the Free State (South Africa), the University of Utrecht and the University of Wageningen (Netherlands). He also holds professorships in Melbourne and Murdoch (Australia), and in Chiang Mai (Thailand).

In 2018 Crous was elected a member of the Royal Netherlands Academy of Arts and Sciences.

== MycoBank ==
In 2004 he launched MycoBank, a freely available online database to capture all fungal novelties described by the research community, which has since become mandatory in the International Code of Nomenclature for algae, fungi, and plants from 2013 onwards. Prof Crous has played an active role in teaching microbial biodiversity, and has added several thousand cultures to the CBS culture collection, and has described more than 3000 fungal taxa, the majority also supplemented with DNA barcodes. From the start, he has been a strong supporter to build the library of life for biodiversity on earth, and in this capacity, was the European representative in the International Barcode of Life project (Genome Canada), the chair of the European Consortium for the Barcode of Life, served on the Executive of the Consortium for the Barcode of Life, and participated in major projects such as the FES Plant Health, Tree of Life, and FP7- Quarantine Barcode of Life.

== Publications ==
He has published more than 600 papers, authored or edited more than 30 books, and monographed several genera of major economic importance to global food and fibre security.

Crous has supervised or co-supervised 26 master's theses and has been the promoter or co-promoter of 20 doctoral dissertations. Crous teaches courses in biosystematics and plant pathology. His research focuses on the systematics of plant pathogenic fungi causing disease of economically important crops, also relevant to quarantine and trade in food and fibre.
