= Geml =

Geml or GEML may refer to:

- Great Eastern Main Line, a major English rail line
- General Enterprise Modelling Language, a component of Generalised Enterprise Reference Architecture and Methodology
- Iosif Geml, mayor of Timișoara, Hungary from 1914 to 1919
- József Geml, Hungarian mycologist and editor of Persoonia
- Melilla Airport (ICAO: GEML), an airport in the namesake Spanish enclave in Africa
