= Kew Herbarium =

Herbarium in London

Coordinates: 51°29′06″N 0°17′28″W

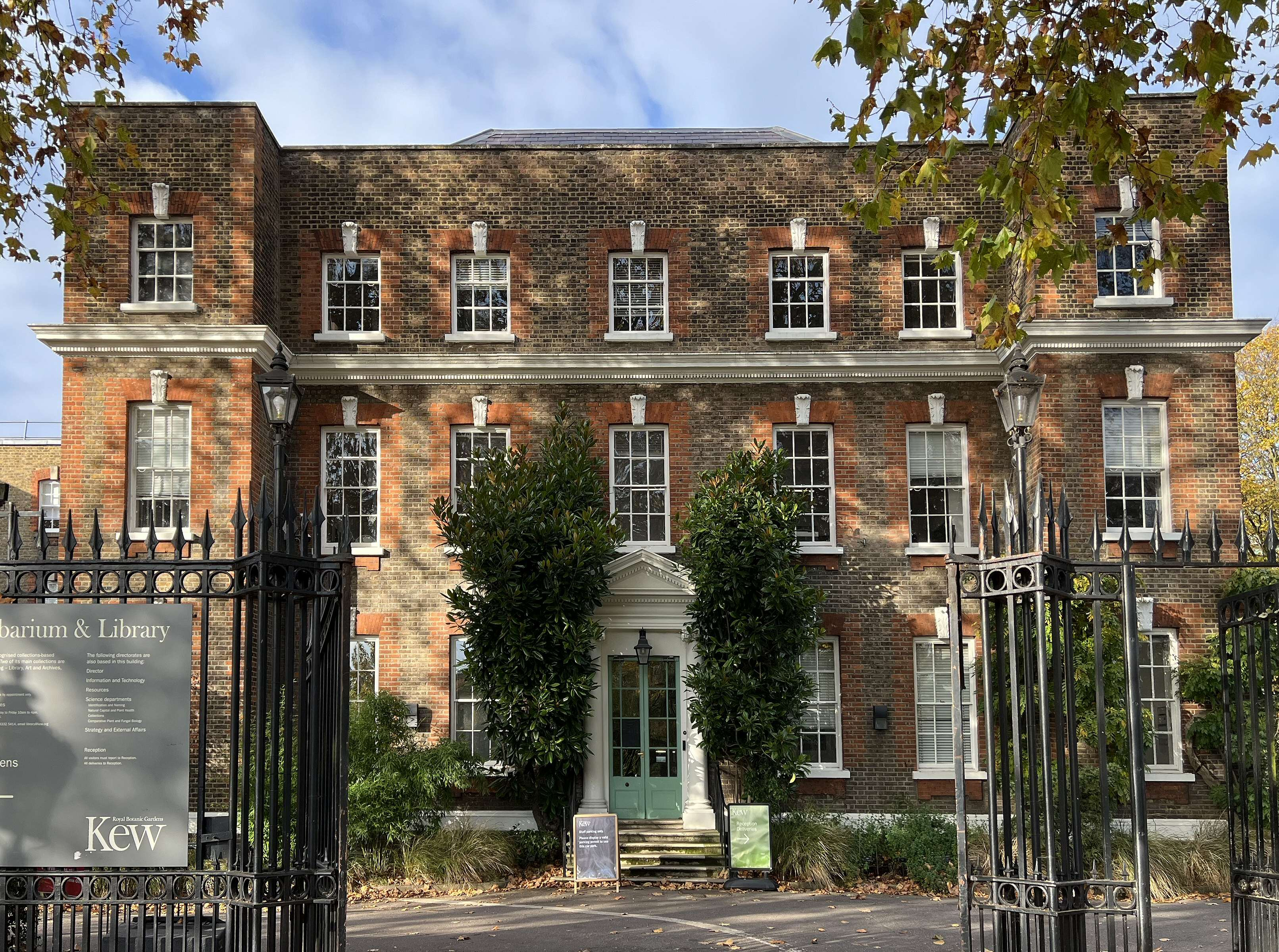
Kew Herbarium and Library

The Kew Herbarium (herbarium code: K) is one of the world's largest and most historically significant herbaria, housed at the Royal Botanic Gardens, Kew in London, England. Established in the 1850s on the ground floor of Hunter House, it has grown to maintain approximately seven million preserved plant specimens, including 330,000 type specimens. The herbarium's collections, which include specimens dating back to 1700, represent about 95% of known vascular plant genera and 60% of described fungi, with specimens collected over 260 years of botanical exploration. The herbarium processes around 5,000 specimen loans annually and hosts approximately 3,000 visitor-days of research visits each year, supporting a wide range of botanical research.

The herbarium's development has been closely tied to British botanical exploration and colonial expansion, with contributions from influential directors like Sir Joseph Dalton Hooker and major acquisitions including the Gay Herbarium. Research at the herbarium has contributed to botanical taxonomy, with publications such as the Index Kewensis, initiated with funding from Charles Darwin in 1882, and the Kew Record. The facility has undergone several major expansions since its first purpose-built wing was constructed in 1877, with Victorian architecture that includes spiral staircases, iron columns, and vast handcrafted wooden cupboards. In 2022, the herbarium initiated a £29 million digitisation project to produce high-resolution images of its collection, with a target completion date of 2026.

The herbarium is a resource for botanical research in taxonomy, conservation, ecology, and climate science. Its specimens offer data that aid in tracking environmental changes, studying plant diseases, and identifying new species, as demonstrated by the 2022 discovery of Victoria boliviana, the world's largest water lily species, which had remained unrecognised in the collection for almost two centuries. The herbarium's future is currently subject to debate, with controversial plans announced in 2023 to relocate the collection to Thames Valley Science Park, prompting discussion about the balance between preservation needs, research accessibility, and maintaining the historic connection between the herbarium and Kew's living collections.

== History and development ==
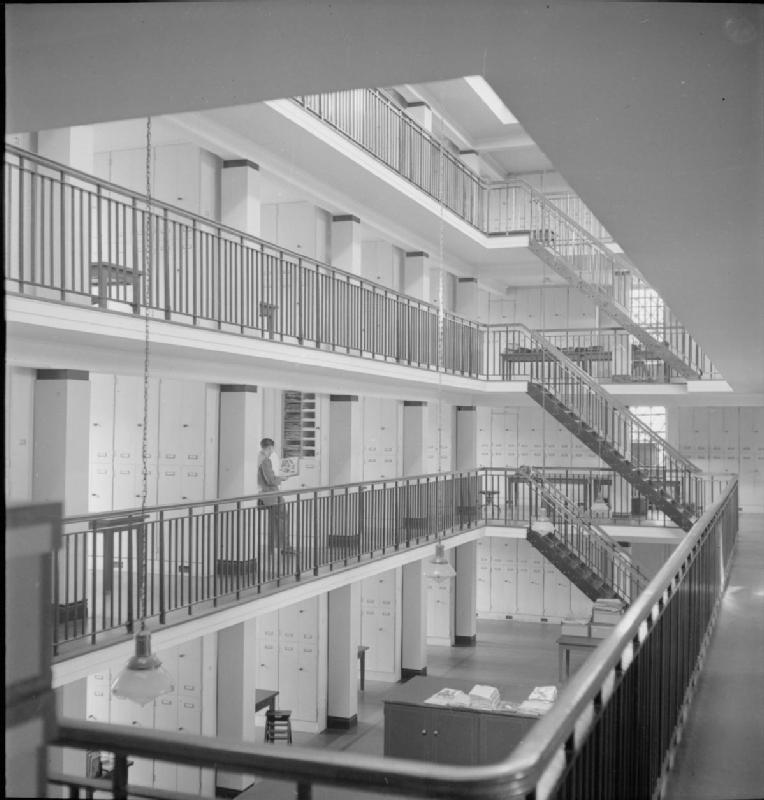
View of the interior of the Herbarium at Kew Gardens in 1943

Prior to the establishment of Kew's herbarium, botanical specimens in London were primarily studied at Sir Joseph Banks' collection in Soho Square. This changed after William Jackson Hooker became Kew's Director in 1841, when he began allowing researchers to access his substantial private collection at his residence near the gardens. The herbarium officially began in 1852 when the ground floor of Hunter House, an early 18th-century Queen Anne style building on Kew Green, was allocated to store both Hooker's collection and the herbarium and library of William Arnold Bromfield. Hunter House had previously been the residence of the Duke of Cumberland (later King of Hanover) until his death in 1851, and formed part of a larger complex with the adjacent Meyer's House (now Hanover House). In 1876, parts of Hunter House, including its drawing room, south room, kitchen and river frontage steps, were demolished to make way for the herbarium's first purpose-built wing. The following year saw the appointment of the first curator, Allan Black.

The herbarium's collection includes specimens from many notable historical figures, illustrating its connection to exploration and scientific discovery. Among its treasures is a specimen of Faroa nyasica collected by David Livingstone in the 1860s during his explorations of what is now Malawi. While the collection includes a 4,000-year-old olive tree branch from Tutankhamun's tomb, its oldest officially catalogued specimen is Indigofera astragalina, collected by Daniel du Bois at Fort St. George in India in 1700. Other early specimens are those collected by Samuel Browne, a surgeon working for the East India Company in the 1690s. Browne collected plants around Madras (now Chennai) and collaborated with Tamil and Telugu speakers to record local plant names and uses.

The early herbarium grew rapidly through both government grants and private donations. In 1853, the herbarium received William Bromfield's Flora Vectensis. An expansion took place in 1854 when George Bentham donated his herbarium and library to the nation, on condition they would be housed at Kew and remain accessible to botanists. After William Hooker's death in 1865, the government purchased his herbarium and library in 1866.

Many significant historical collections were incorporated during this early period, including Allan Cunningham's Australasian specimens, William John Burchell's collections from Saint Helena and South Africa, Robert Brown's British specimens, Hewett Watson's British collections, Amelia Griffiths's algae, William Wright and Johan Peter Rottler's Indian specimens, and several general herbaria. The extensive Indian collections of Hooker and Thomas Thomson that reached Kew in 1851 contained an estimated 8,000 species. Another valuable acquisition was the herbarium of Jacques Gay, which arrived at Kew in 1868. This collection included early specimens from Senegal collected in the 1820s by Claude Richard, the founder of the Richard Tol botanical gardens, and by Döllinger (who collected in Senegal during 1823, particularly around Richard Tol). Many of these specimens were originally sent to Gay by Baron Jacques François Roger, the governor of Senegal (1821–1826), who played an important role in furthering botanical research in the region.

The first purpose-built wing of the herbarium was constructed in 1877, prompted by the need for additional space to accommodate botanical specimens collected during exploration of the British Empire. Around 1878, a large hall was added – a quadrangular structure eighty-six feet by forty-three feet, with a ground floor and two galleries connected by two spiral staircases and lit by forty-eight windows. A second hall of the same dimensions was completed around 1903. The facility underwent several further expansions between 1902 and 1969, including basement extensions. The facility has expanded periodically to house its growing collections, with extensions added approximately every 40 years. This pattern of growth continued with a modern wing added in 2009.

In 1969, a major reorganisation of British botanical collections took place when Kew transferred its bryophytes, algae, and most of its lichens to the British Museum (Natural History) on permanent loan, receiving in exchange the British Museum's fungal collections. By this time, the herbarium's holdings had grown substantially – from over 2,000,000 specimens mounted on 1,500,000 sheets in 1903 to its current size of approximately seven million specimens.

=== Architecture and design ===
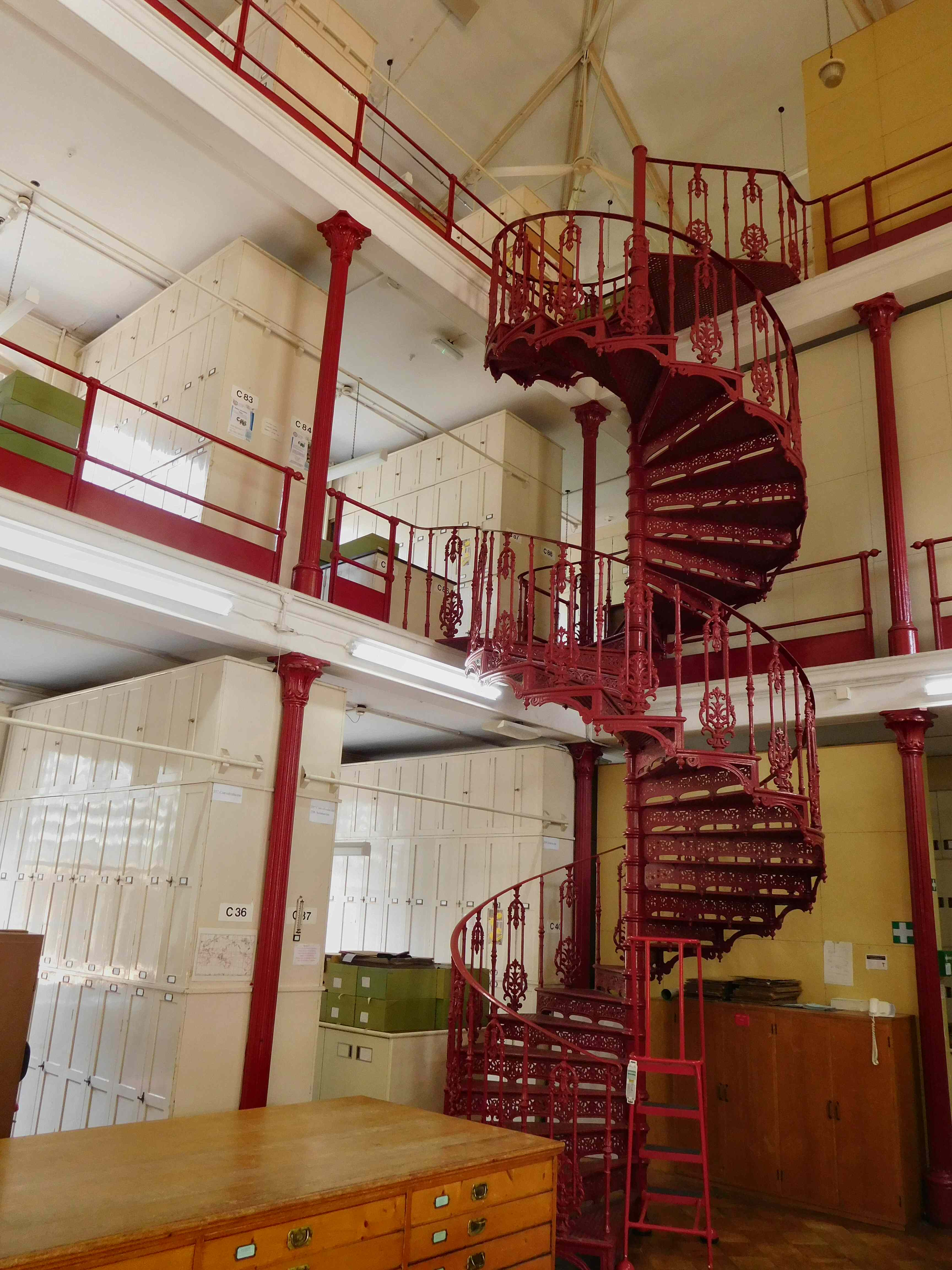
Three-story spiral staircases stand beside tall iron columns in the old wing of the herbarium.

The original 1877 Wing C exemplifies the grand Victorian architecture that characterises much of the herbarium. Its interior features a soaring rectangular warehouse design with three-story spiral staircases beside tall red iron columns, in what staff affectionately call a "jailhouse style." The space is flooded with natural light from enormous windows - a deliberate 19th-century design choice to minimize the use of gas lanterns around the paper specimens. Vast handcrafted wooden cupboards are arranged in rows, creating what staff call small "cells" between the stacks that point toward the centre of the room. The historic wing has a unique atmosphere, marked by the scent of old paper and preserved specimens.

Subsequent wings retained similar architectural features to the original design through the early 20th century, with Wing B (1902) matching the galleried interior and woodwork of Wing C. The newer wings show the evolution of herbarium design – Wing E (2009) replaced the traditional wooden cupboards with wheel-operated compactor shelves and substituted windows for modern climate control systems maintaining a constant 18°C. The facility includes two cavernous basements housing specialised collections. These storage areas feature custom-made boxes designed for preserving particular specimen types, with shelving extending deep into climate-controlled storage areas.

== Notable directors and staff ==
=== Joseph Dalton Hooker ===
Sir Joseph Dalton Hooker (1817–1911) served as Assistant Director (1855–1865) and then Director (1865–1885) of Kew Gardens. During his tenure, he substantially expanded the herbarium's collections through his own extensive botanical expeditions and by establishing a wide network of scientific exchanges. Hooker conducted several major collecting expeditions, including voyages to Antarctica and the South Pacific (1839–1843), India and the Himalayas (1847–1851), and the western United States (1877). His Indian expedition alone yielded over 150,000 specimens representing around 7,000 species. During his travels in Sikkim, he collected specimens of 25 previously unknown species of rhododendron. His botanical artwork and field sketches from these expeditions are preserved in Kew's art collection.

A prolific author, Hooker formally described over 12,000 new plant species during his career. His major publications included the multi-volume Flora of British India and Genera Plantarum, the latter written with George Bentham establishing a systematic structure for plant classification that remained in use at Kew for over 130 years.

=== Peter Shaw Green ===
Peter Shaw Green (1920–2009) served as Keeper of the Herbarium and Deputy Director of Kew Gardens from 1975 to 1982. He was particularly known for his expertise in the taxonomy of Oleaceae and the flora of the south-western Pacific. During his tenure, he reorganised the herbarium's sectional structure to be based on systematic rather than geographical responsibilities. Green also played a crucial role in establishing the management of the Herbarium and Library as a single unit, which later evolved into the Herbarium, Library, Art & Archives department.

Green joined Kew in 1966 in the Australian Section of the Herbarium, later becoming Deputy Keeper and editor of the Kew Bulletin. In this role, he cleared the mounting backlog of manuscripts and restored the publication to a regular schedule. After retirement in 1982, he continued his research as an Honorary Research Fellow, contributing accounts of the Oleaceae to various floras including the Flora of China and Flora of Thailand.

=== Bernard Verdcourt ===
Bernard Verdcourt (1925–2011) was a prolific taxonomist who worked at Kew from 1964 to 2008, first as Principal Scientific Officer and later as an Honorary Research Fellow. He made substantial contributions to the Flora of Tropical East Africa, authoring over one-fifth of this major work which covered 12,500 species. Verdcourt published extensively on the taxonomy of various plant families, including Rubiaceae, Leguminosae, Convolvulaceae and Annonaceae.

During his career, he contributed more than 1,220 scientific papers and books, focusing not only on botany but also on malacology and entomology. He was particularly known for his meticulous attention to detail in plant taxonomy and his willingness to assist younger botanists. His taxonomic work was recognised with several honours, including the Kew Medal in 1986 and the Linnean Society's Gold Medal in 2000.

== Collections and access ==
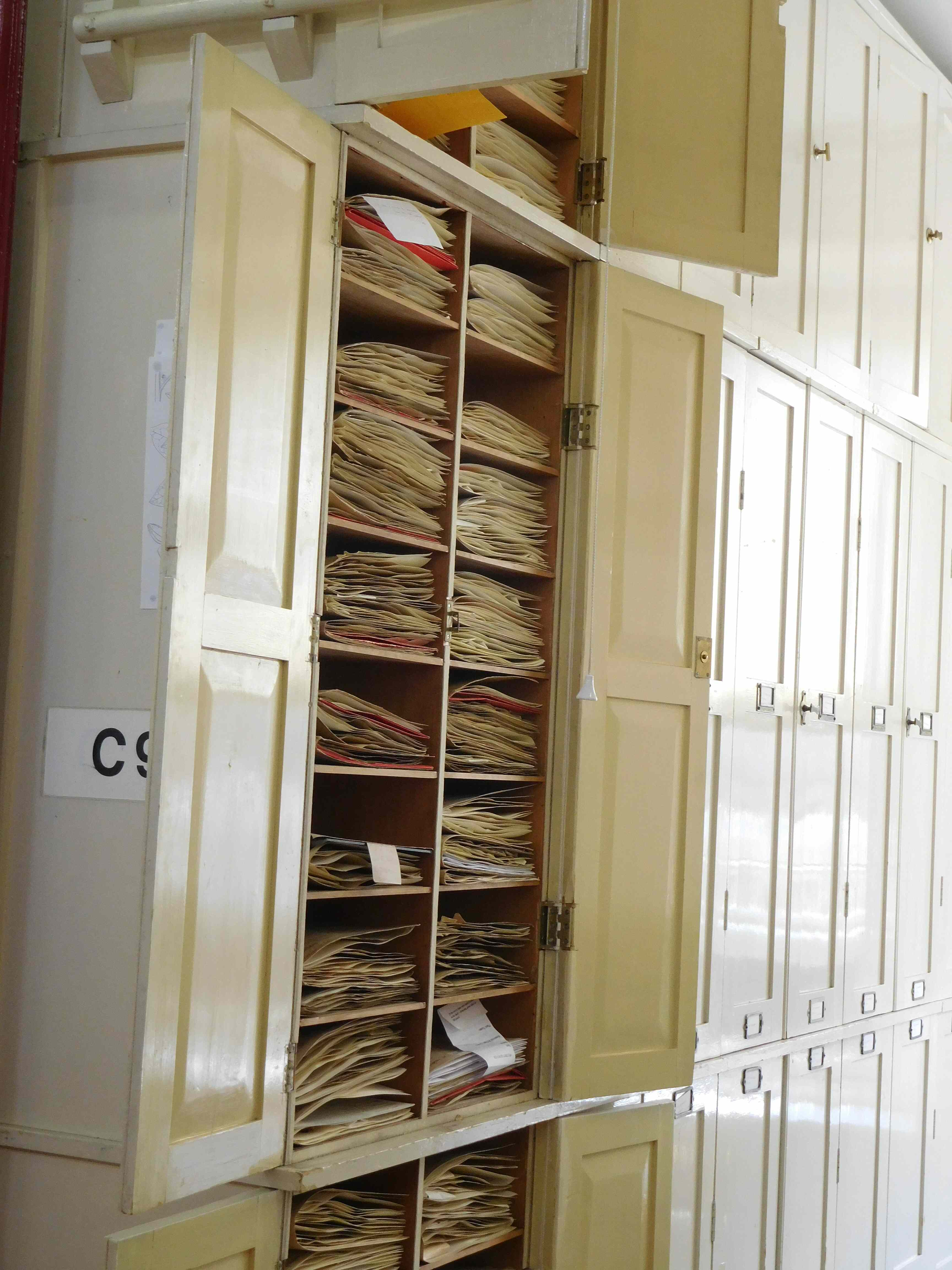
Specimen storage in the wooden cabinets, showing the traditional vertical filing system for preserved plant sheets. These handcrafted cupboards, characteristic of the older wings, store thousands of mounted specimens in organised compartments.

The size of the collection has been a subject of historical interest. In 1953, for the herbarium's centenary, it was estimated to contain approximately 6 million specimens. However, a detailed statistical analysis conducted in 1970 revealed that these earlier estimates had been inflated. The study, which sampled 279 pigeonholes from a total of 64,199, established that the herbarium contained approximately 4,188,000 specimens, including about 275,000 type specimens. By 2024, the collection had grown to approximately seven million specimens.

The Kew Herbarium houses approximately seven million preserved vascular plant specimens, making it one of the largest herbaria in the world. The institution's internationally recognised herbarium code is K, and it is used when citing housed specimens. The collections are highly representative of global plant diversity, containing about 95% of known vascular plant genera. Of particular scientific importance are the 330,000 type specimens, which serve as nomenclatural standards for plant identification and taxonomy. Approximately 30,000 to 50,000 new specimens are added to the herbarium's collections each year. About a quarter of these new accessions come from Kew staff working with international partners, while the remainder arrive through exchanges with other herbaria worldwide.

Specimens are typically collected when plants are in flower or fruit to aid identification. Field collection methods have remained largely unchanged since the herbarium's founding - plants are pressed and dried between sheets in traditional flower presses before being shipped to Kew. Specimens typically arrive wrapped in newspaper from their country of origin, which was used to dry them in the field. Each specimen includes a collector's label with provisional identification and contextual information, often accompanied by field notes, maps, and notebooks that provide valuable details about the time and place of collection. Once received, specimens require specialised preservation methods depending on their type, with facilities like custom storage boxes for delicate specimens such as cacti.

The herbarium regularly supports international research through specimen loans and visiting researchers. Around 10,000 specimens are sent out annually as loans or exchanges to scientists worldwide. The facility hosts hundreds of visiting researchers each year, who use the collections not only for taxonomic studies but also for research in conservation planning, agricultural development, environmental science, and climate studies.

== Conservation and preservation ==
The herbarium processes approximately 5,000 specimen loans annually and facilitates around 3,000 researcher visits each year, supporting botanical research worldwide.

The preservation of specimens is a central aspect of the herbarium's work. Historically, various methods have been used to mount and preserve specimens. In the 19th century, specimens were typically mounted on high-quality rag paper using traditional materials like wheat starch paste and animal glue. By the mid-20th century, newer materials such as polyvinyl acetate adhesives and plastic mountants were introduced, though some of these later proved problematic for long-term preservation.

The basic preservation process has remained largely unchanged since the herbarium's founding, though methods have evolved over time. New acquisitions follow a specific protocol: specimens are collected and dried between sheets of paper in presses, then undergo deep-freezing to eradicate pests before awaiting examination by specialist taxonomists. After verification of plant identification, specimens are mounted on acid-free papers using appropriate adhesives that allow for future examination, then imaged, digitised, and finally incorporated into the collections. While various chemical treatments have historically been used to prevent insect attack, the institution now primarily relies on deep-freezing for pest control. Documentation has similarly evolved from handwritten labels to computer-generated ones including GPS data, though historical specimens preserve important contextual details from collectors like A.F.G. Kerr's detailed Thai specimens from the 1920s and 1930s.

== Publications and research ==
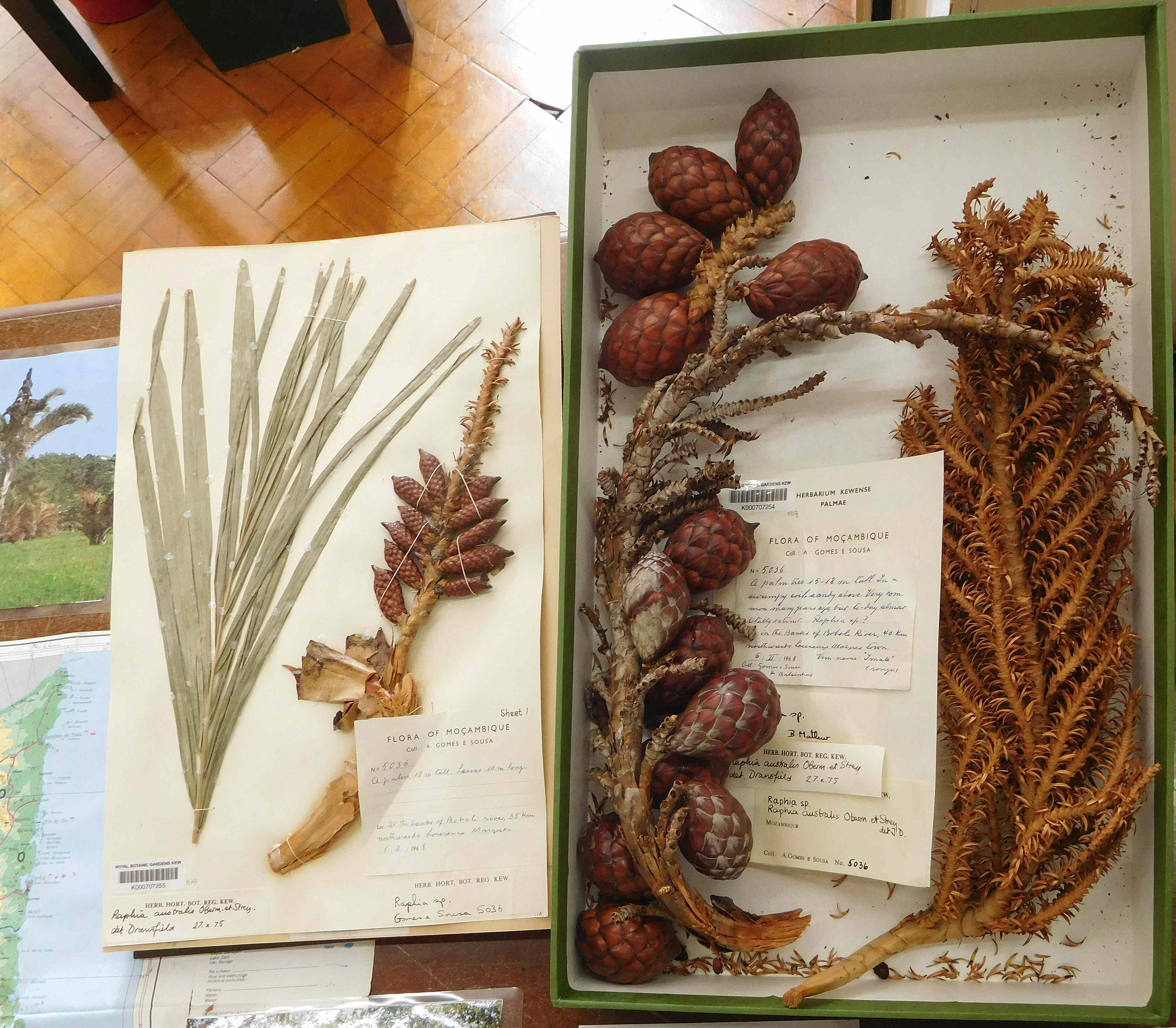
The distinctive fan palm leaves and fruit clusters of Raphia australis mounted as herbarium specimens, showing how different parts of the plant are preserved and stored. Large specimens like these palms often require specialised storage solutions, including custom boxes to accommodate their size.

The Kew Herbarium has contributed to a wide range of botanical research. Beyond its traditional importance in taxonomic studies, the collections underpin research in conservation, ecology, sustainable development, and climate science. The specimens offer information on plant morphology, distribution, environmental niches, phenology (flowering and fruiting times), and even genetic material that can be extracted for DNA studies.

=== Index Kewensis ===
The creation of the Index Kewensis, initiated in 1882 through funding from Charles Darwin, marked an important development in botanical taxonomy. The project was conceived to create a comprehensive index of all published names of seed-bearing plants, as Darwin had found Steudel's Nomenclator (the only existing work of this type) useful but outdated. The first volumes, published between 1893 and 1895, were compiled by Benjamin Daydon Jackson under the direction of Joseph Hooker. The original work contained approximately 375,000 species names.

The Index has been regularly updated through supplements since its initial publication, with the herbarium staff at Kew scanning the scientific literature to document new plant names and taxonomic changes. The work evolved from providing taxonomic judgments in its early volumes to becoming a straightforward index of published names. It now forms part of the International Plant Names Index (IPNI).

=== Kew Record ===
In 1974, Kew Herbarium launched the Kew Record of Taxonomic Literature, an annual bibliography aimed at providing comprehensive coverage of taxonomic literature on vascular plants worldwide. The publication catalogued all new plant names (except cultivars) and relevant taxonomic papers, organising them systematically rather than alphabetically. This addressed limitations of existing resources such as the Index Kewensis, which only covered generic and specific names and was published quinquennially.

The Kew Record organised its content into systematic groups, with entries placed under relevant plant families and genera where possible. The publication also included sections on floristics, organised by geographical regions corresponding to the herbarium's own specimen organisation system. Additional sections covered topics such as nomenclature, chromosome surveys, chemotaxonomy, anatomy and morphology, palynology, embryology, and reproductive biology.

=== Taxonomic studies ===
The herbarium's collections have supported landmark taxonomic revisions and continue to enable researchers to resolve taxonomic problems. For example, mycological studies using Kew's specimens have helped clarify species concepts in various fungal groups. In his examination of Berkeley and Broome's Psathyrella specimens at Kew, the Dutch mycologist Emile Kits van Waveren was able to study 28 historical type specimens, allowing him to determine that some specimens actually belonged to different genera (Lacrymaria, Conocybe, Panaeolus) and establish that some historic names were synonyms of already-known species. Similarly, Meinhard Moser's studies of Cortinarius collections at Kew helped resolve the taxonomy of this notoriously difficult genus of mushrooms.

The collections have been particularly important for studying plant groups from former British colonies and protectorates. Aberdeen used the Australian Lepiota specimens at Kew to revise this genus of mushroom-forming fungi in Australia, clarifying species boundaries and establishing new combinations. For aquatic plants, Horn af Rantzien examined tropical African Najas specimens at Kew to describe new species and better understand species relationships in this challenging genus.

The herbarium also enables research on plant-insect interactions through preserved evidence on specimens. Welch examined the Kew Herbarium's cultivated Quercus collection to document historical occurrences of gall wasps (Cynipinae) on non-British oak species, finding evidence of galls on specimens dating back to the 19th century.

=== Research applications ===
The herbarium's specimens support diverse scientific investigations beyond traditional taxonomy. The collection provides plant information useful for multiple research purposes. DNA analysis has become a crucial modern application of the collections. DNA can be extracted from specimens hundreds of years old, helping construct plant family trees and rearrange taxonomic classifications. According to David Mabberley, former keeper of the Herbarium, this has led to significant reorganization of collections, with an estimated 10–12% of plants being reassigned to different families based on genetic evidence rather than physical appearances.

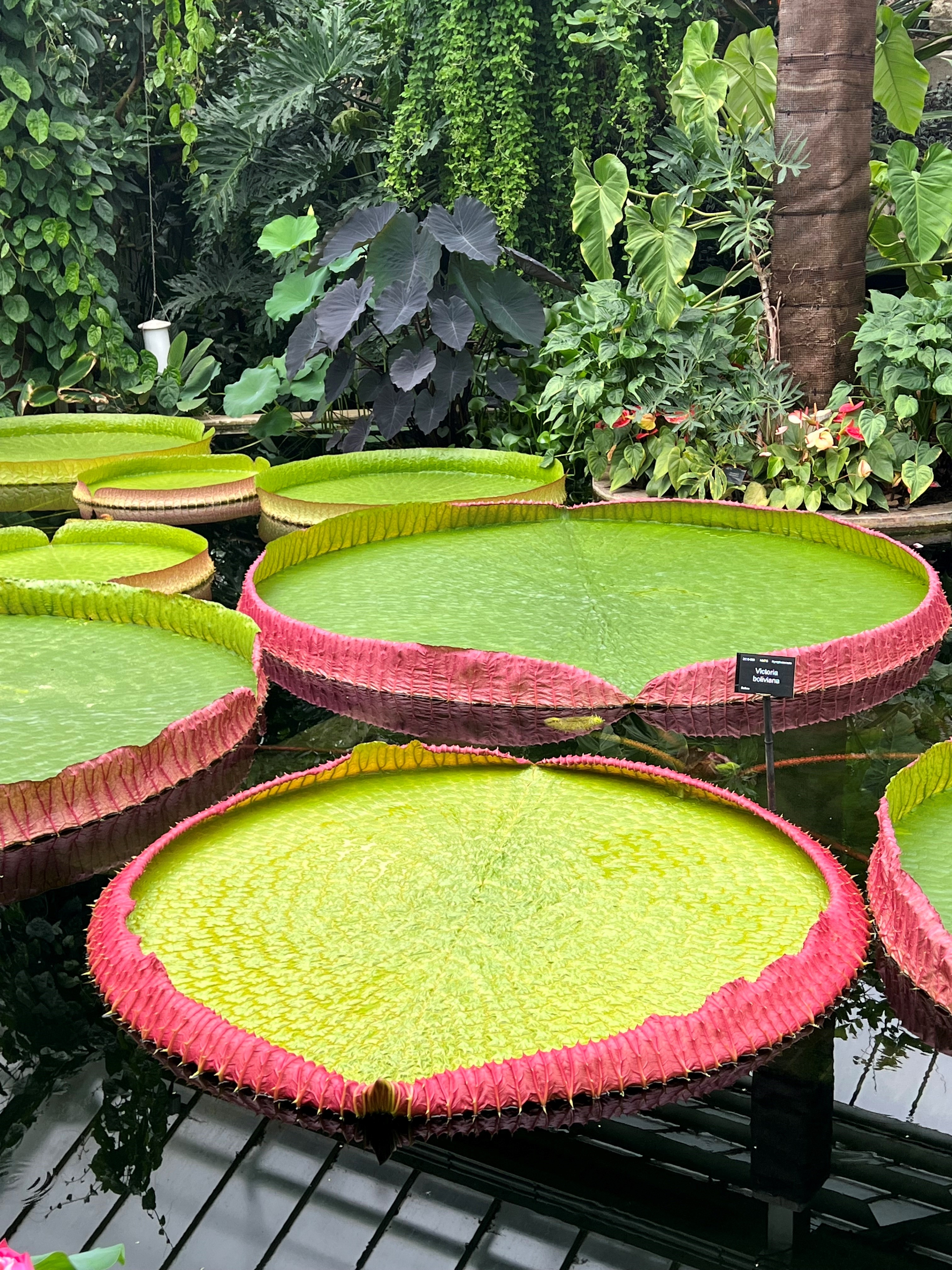
Victoria boliviana water lily pads at Kew Gardens, showing the distinctive large circular leaves with raised rims characteristic of the genus. This species, identified in 2022 using Kew's herbarium specimens, can grow leaves up to 3.2 metres in diameter.

The herbarium's role in modern species discovery was demonstrated in 2022 when specimens in its collection helped identify Victoria boliviana, the world's largest water lily species. Despite samples being in Kew's collection for almost two centuries, the species went unrecognised until Carlos Magdalena, one of Kew's water lily experts, collaborated with Bolivian institutions to study seeds from specimens suspected to be of novel species. The subsequent research combined traditional botanical examination with genetic testing to confirm the new species, which can produce leaves up to 3.2 meters in diameter – larger than any other water lily species.

Despite modern technological advances like GPS devices and digital cameras, many fundamental research practices at the herbarium remain unchanged from Victorian times. As herbarium researcher André Schuiteman noted in 2013, "We still look at plants stuck to a piece of paper... We still go to faraway places and collect samples. We keep up with our times, but we also still keep to the 19th century in some ways". The use of traditional methods alongside new technologies allows researchers to study current field guides and specimens from regions like Oman and Thailand in conjunction with historical collections from these areas.

The specimens offer data for historical environmental research. They provide evidence for tracking chemical changes in soil and air through analysis of heavy metals absorbed by plants. Historical carbon dioxide levels can be studied by examining leaf structures, as plants take up carbon dioxide through holes in their leaves. The specimens also enable researchers to compare historical and current flowering times, track the spread of invasive species, and study changes in biodiversity in specific locations over time.

In agricultural applications, the collections support plant breeding programs by helping identify genetic traits controlling characteristics like height and colour. They also aid in understanding plant diseases – for example, historical specimens helped trace the progression of the 1840s potato blight.

The collections continue to be used by researchers to identify threatened species, study biodiversity patterns, and inform conservation planning. Historical specimens provide baseline data for studying environmental and climate change. The collections are also valuable for fields beyond botany – historians use them as records of discovery, exploration, and scientific collaborations over the past 250 years.

== Digital access ==
In 2022, Kew began an ambitious four-year digitisation project to create a complete digital catalogue of its herbarium and fungarium collections, which together comprise approximately 8.5 million specimens. Estimated to cost £29 million, it is the largest project in Kew's history, with the goal of completion by 2026. The project aims to make high-resolution images and specimen data freely available through the Kew Data Portal. By July 2024, 3.4 million specimens had been digitised. Prior to this project, all 330,000 type specimens had already been digitised and made available through platforms such as the Global Biodiversity Information Facility (GBIF) and JSTOR Global Plants.

The digitisation project involves specialist teams including imaging experts, data managers, quality assurance specialists, and curator-botanists. The process has revealed various conservation challenges within the collection, including detached plant parts and labels, deteriorated sheets, evidence of pest and mould damage, and wear from repeated handling over centuries. In response, the herbarium appointed its first dedicated Project Conservator in 2024. The collections being digitised are especially valuable as they include over 95% of known vascular plant genera and 60% of described fungi, representing more than 260 years of botanical exploration.

== Future developments ==
In 2023, Kew announced controversial plans to relocate the herbarium approximately 60 kilometres away to Thames Valley Science Park, owned by the University of Reading. The proposed move, estimated to cost £200 million and take a decade to complete, aims to address space constraints (the herbarium receives about 20,000 to 25,000 new specimens annually) and concerns about fire and flood risks in the current historic building. The new purpose-built facility would include labs for DNA extraction and digital imaging, with space for over 150 researchers.

Some members of the botanical community have strongly opposed the plan. Over 15,000 people, including plant scientists worldwide and former Kew director Sir Ghillean Prance, signed a petition opposing the move. Critics argue that separating the herbarium from Kew's gardens would disrupt crucial interactions between the collection and the living plants, and impede research collaboration. They maintain that the current building could be retrofitted to safely accommodate the growing collection.

Kew management asserts that expansion at the current site is limited due to Kew's World Heritage Site status, and cites risks from flooding from the nearby River Thames and potential fire hazards. They propose redeveloping the current herbarium building, which is not open to the public, as a science quarter to display historically important specimens, including those donated by Charles Darwin. The controversy raises broader questions about herbarium access and equity in botanical science, highlighting the importance of maintaining accessibility for researchers. This is particularly relevant given that only 30% of the world's estimated 400 million herbarium specimens have been described online, and just 10% have been digitised.

== See also ==
- Conservation and restoration of herbaria
- Exsiccata
- List of herbaria
- List of herbaria in Europe
