= Studies in Mycology =

- Discipline: Mycology
- Language: English
- Edited by: Robert A. Samson

Publication details
- History: 1972–present
- Publisher: Elsevier on behalf of CBS-KNAW Fungal Biodiversity Centre (Netherlands)
- Frequency: Triannual
- Open access: Yes
- Impact factor: 25.731 (2021)

Standard abbreviations
- ISO 4: Stud. Mycol.

Indexing
- CODEN: SMYCA2
- ISSN: 0166-0616 (print); 1872-9797 (web)
- OCLC no.: 2604492

Links
- Journal homepage; Online access

Studies in Mycology is a peer-reviewed open access scientific journal of mycology published by Elsevier on behalf of the Royal Netherlands Academy of Arts and Sciences' CBS Fungal Biodiversity Centre. The journal was established in 1972, and is edited by Robert A. Samson. It is published three times per year.

== Indexing and abstracting ==
According to the Journal Citation Reports, Studies in Mycology has a 2014 impact factor of 13.250. It is abstracted and indexed in the following bibliographic databases:

- BIOSIS Previews
- Science Citation Index
- Scopus
