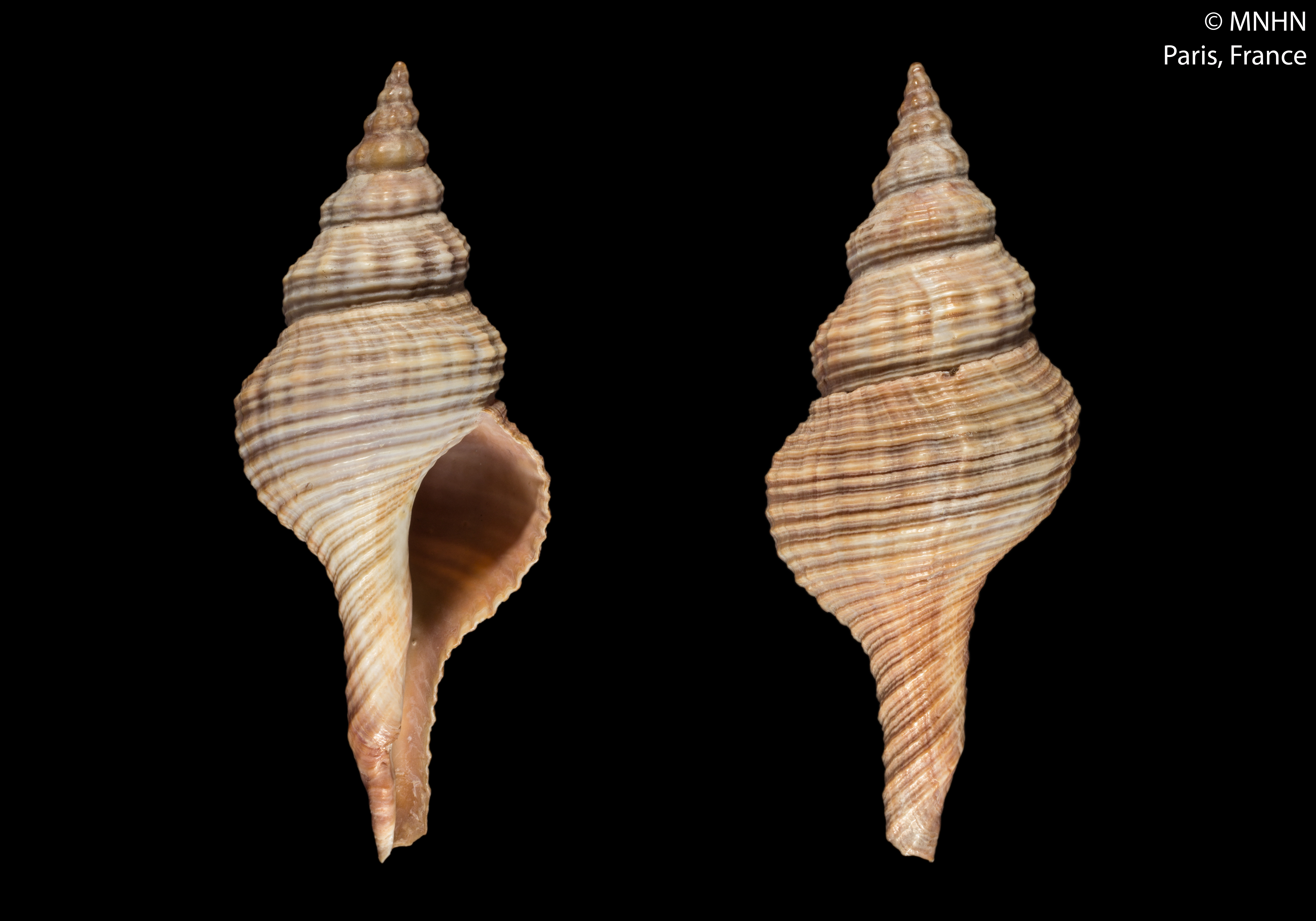
- Shell of Propefusus australis (syntype at MNHN, Paris)

Scientific classification
- Kingdom: Animalia
- Phylum: Mollusca
- Class: Gastropoda
- Subclass: Caenogastropoda
- Order: Neogastropoda
- Superfamily: Buccinoidea
- Family: Fasciolariidae
- Genus: Propefusus; Iredale, 1924

Type species
- Fusus pyrulatus Reeve, 1847

= Propefusus =

Genus of gastropods

Propefusus is a genus of sea snails, marine gastropod mollusks in the subfamily Fusininae of the family Fasciolariidae, the spindle snails, the tulip snails and their allies.

== Species ==
Species within the genus Propefusus include:

- Propefusus australis (Quoy & Gaimard, 1833)
- Propefusus novaehollandiae (Reeve, 1848)
- Propefusus undulatus (Perry, 1811)
