= Arise (research project) =

Dutch biodiversity monitoring project

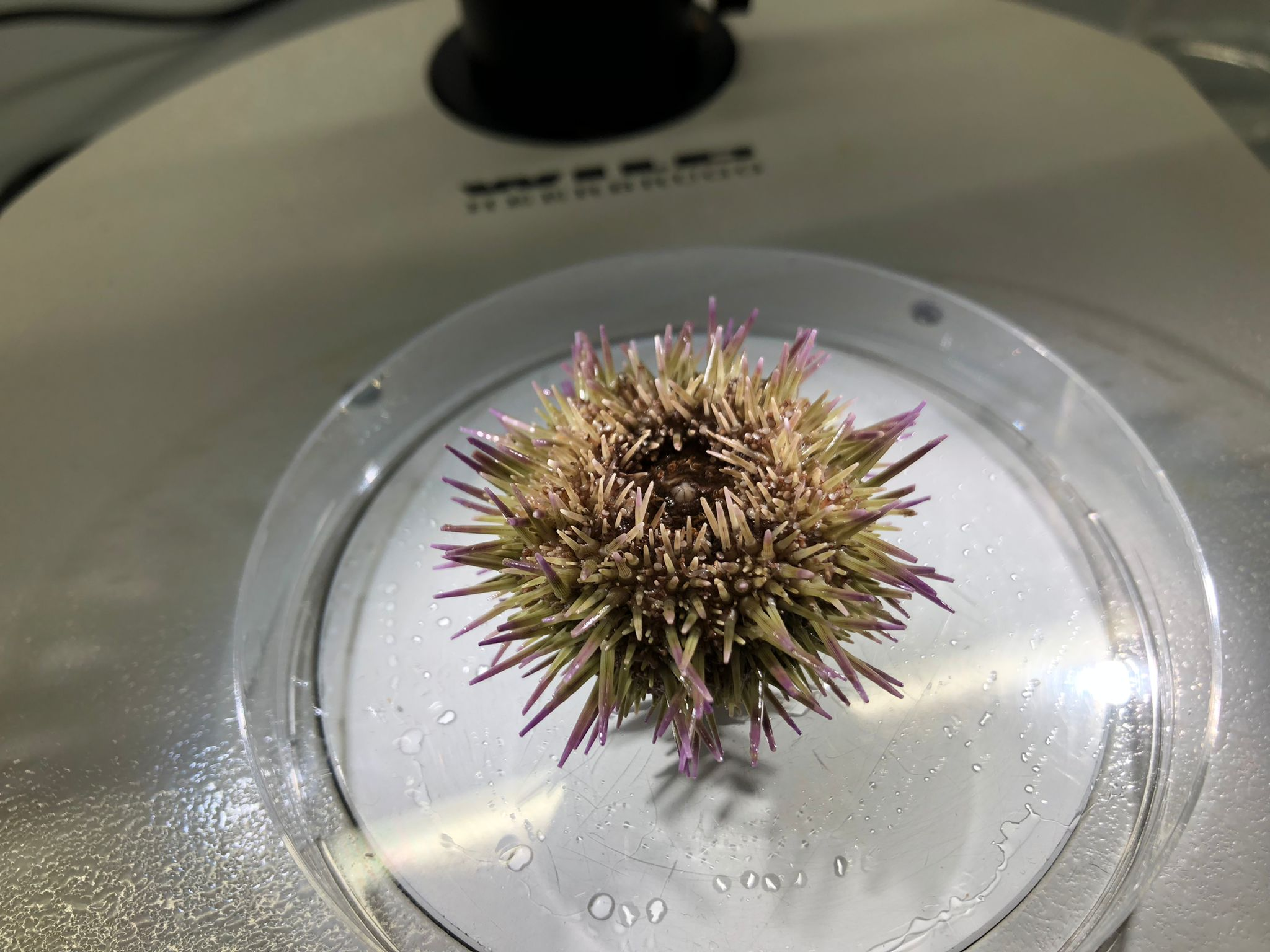
DNA sampling of a Green Sea Urchin at Naturalis Biodiversity Center for the ARISE project, 2021.

ARISE is a Dutch scientific research program that aims to completely map biodiversity in the European territory of the Netherlands. In addition, the goal is to set up semi-automatic infrastructure that can identify species using image and sound recognition technology, radar data, and environmental DNA (eDNA).

The project was started in 2020 and is set to complete within five to ten years. At that point all extant multicellular species, regardless of size, should be incorporated into the system. The project's name stands for Authoritative and Rapid Identification System for Essential biodiversity information. The project is a collaboration between Naturalis Biodiversity Center in Leiden (coordinator), the University of Amsterdam, the Westerdijk Fungal Biodiversity Institute and the University of Twente. ARISE is being subsidized with 18 million euros by the Dutch Research Council (Dutch: NWO) as part of the "National Roadmap Large-Scale Scientific Infrastructure" (Dutch: Nationale Roadmap Grootschalige Wetenschappelijke Infrastructuur).

== Monitoring locations ==
At various locations in the Netherlands, monitoring locations have been set up to record biodiversity using various technologies. For example, in April 2021 a bird radar was put into place at the Artis Zoo in Amsterdam to observe bird migrations. In November 2021, autonomous Diopsis-cameras were installed at the Amsterdamse Waterleidingduinen to monitor insect populations.
