= Emile Kits van Waveren =

Dutch mycologist (1906–1995)

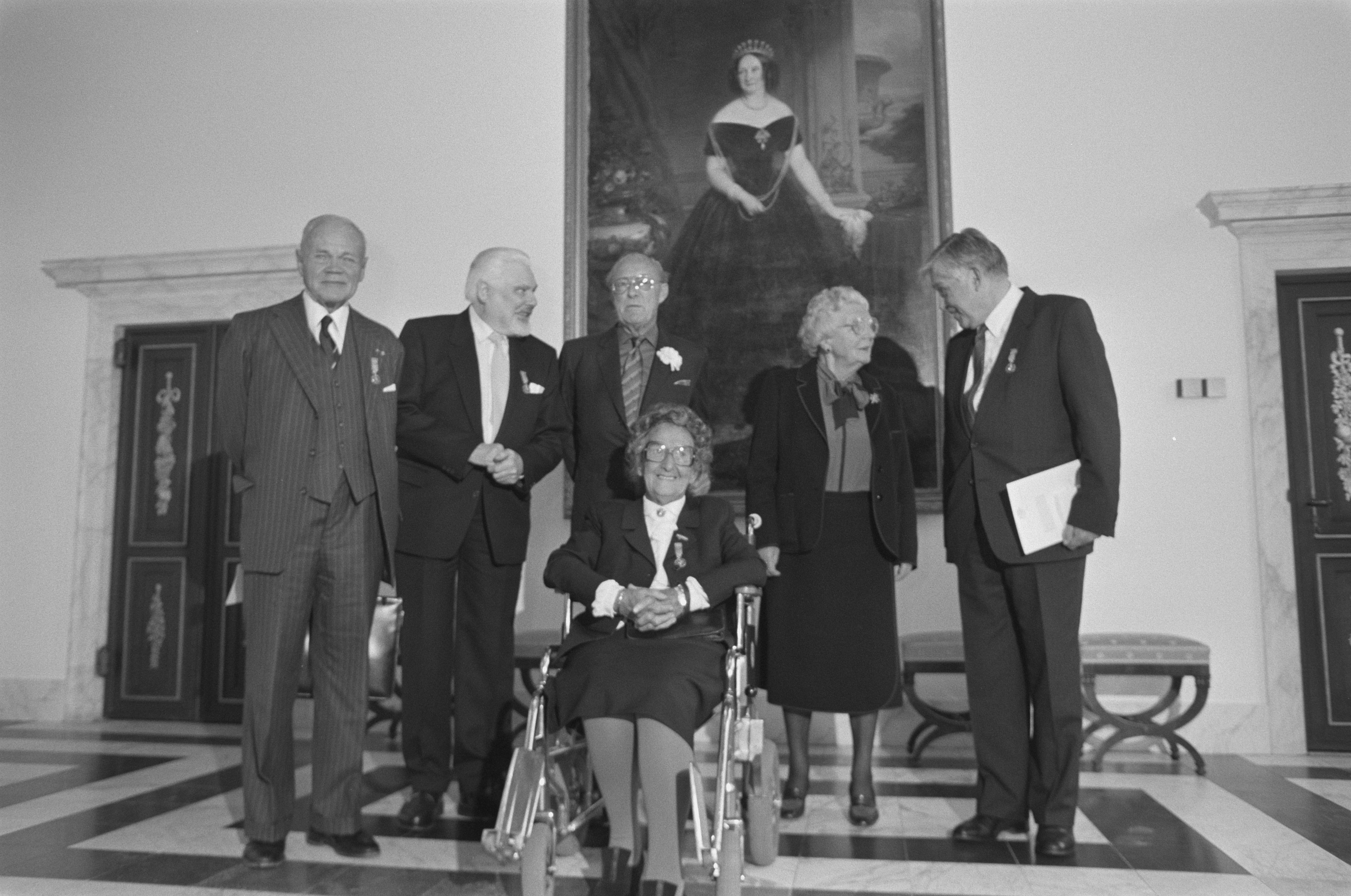
- Presentation of Silver Carnations 1988, with E. Kits van Waveren on the far left
- Born: 10 March 1906; Haarlem, Netherlands
- Died: 3 August 1995 (aged 89)
- Education: University of Amsterdam
- Scientific career
- Fields: Mycology
- Workplaces: Rijksherbarium
- Author abbrev. (botany): Kits van Wav.

Emile Kits van Waveren (10 March 1906–3 September 1995) was a Dutch mycologist known for his contributions to the taxonomy of fungi, particularly the genus Psathyrella.

== Biography ==
Kits van Waveren was born on 10 March 1906 in Haarlem, Netherlands. He studied medicine at the University of Amsterdam, from which he graduated in 1932. His mycological career began with a publication on earth stars (Geastrum, Astraeus and Myriostoma) in 1926, though his most prolific period of mycological research began in 1968.

Van Waveren was particularly noted for his monograph "The Dutch, French and British species of Psathyrella" (1985), which described and illustrated approximately 100 species, including 10 new to science. Throughout his career, he discovered and described 31 new fungal species. Four species were named in his honour: Psathyrella waverenii, Entoloma kitsii, Psathyrella kitsiana, and Psathyrella waveriana.

Despite maintaining a medical career through the 1960s and 1970s, van Waveren followed a strict mycological schedule, collecting specimens on Saturdays, examining them on Sundays, and verifying his findings at the Rijksherbarium on Mondays. His research was primarily conducted in select locations across the Netherlands, Scotland, Wales, and England. His herbarium, containing over 5,000 specimens, was donated to the Rijksherbarium in Leiden.

In 1981, he established the Rijksherbarium Foundation Dr. E. Kits van Waveren to promote research on the fungal order Agaricales. Through his legacy, the foundation continues to finance fellowships at the Rijksherbarium.

Van Waveren was recognised for both his scientific and wartime contributions. He received the Verzetskruis (Dutch Cross of Resistance) for his role in the Dutch resistance during World War II, and the Zilveren Anjer from the Prince Bernhard Foundation for his scientific achievements as an amateur mycologist. He served as an honorary staff member of the Rijksherbarium from 1970 and was made an honorary member of the Netherlands Mycological Society in 1983.

His approach to mycology was characterised by meticulous observation and detailed record-keeping, with his collections accompanied by extensive descriptive notes and drawings of spores and cystidia. His work advanced the study of fungi in Europe, particularly through his contributions to the taxonomy of Psathyrella.
