= Propefusus undulatus =

Scientific classification
- Kingdom: Animalia
- Phylum: Mollusca
- Class: Gastropoda
- Subclass: Caenogastropoda
- Order: Neogastropoda
- Family: Fasciolariidae
- Genus: Propefusus
- Species: P. undulatus

Binomial name
- Propefusus undulatus (Reeve, 1847)

Synonyms
- Fusinus pyrulatus (Reeve, 1847); Fusinus undulatus (Perry, 1811); Fusus pyrulatus Reeve, 1847; Propefusus undulatus (Perry, 1811); Pyrula undulata Perry, 1811

Species of gastropod

Propefusus undulatus is a species of sea snail, a marine gastropod mollusk in the family Fasciolariidae, the spindle snails, the tulip snails and their allies.
