= Zoological Museum Amsterdam =

- Zoölogisch Museum Amsterdam
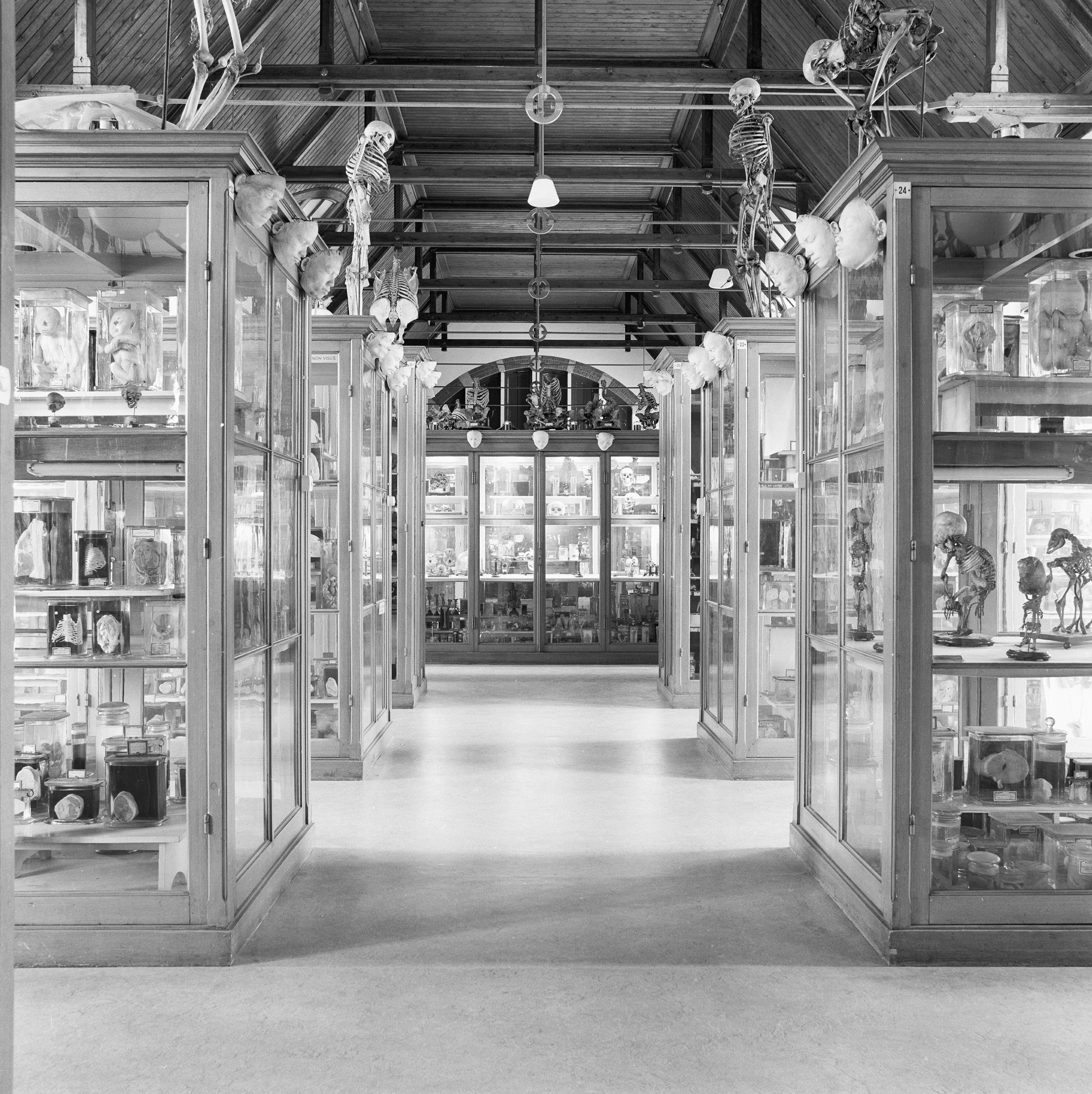
- Zoological Museum in 1987
- Dissolved: 2011; 15 years ago
- Location: Mauritskade 61; Amsterdam, Netherlands
- Type: Natural history museum

The Zoological Museum Amsterdam (ZMA) was a natural history museum located close to Oosterpark in Amsterdam, Netherlands. It was part of the Faculty of Science, Mathematics and Computer Science (Science) of the University of Amsterdam.

It was one of the two major natural history museums in the Netherlands. The total collection included approximately 13 million objects and was used mainly for scientific purposes. In addition to the museum function of the management and conservation of collections and exhibition, it was also a major scientific and (university) education function. At the Aquarium Building Artis Department organized exhibitions around the theme of human nature. The museum was divided into three sections – Vertebrates, Invertebrates and Entomology – and two departments, Exhibitions and Biodiversity Informatics.

In 2011, the collection of the Zoological Museum was merged into that of Naturalis and the National Herbarium of the Netherlands in NCB Naturalis (Dutch Centre for Biodiversity), launched on 26 January 2010. To highlight the move, the Naturalis museum has an exhibition on "Naturalia, circus animals to scientific object", in which objects from the collection of the ZMA are displayed, between 14 October 2011 and 19 August 2012.
