= Christiaan Hendrik Persoon =

German mycologist (1761–1836)

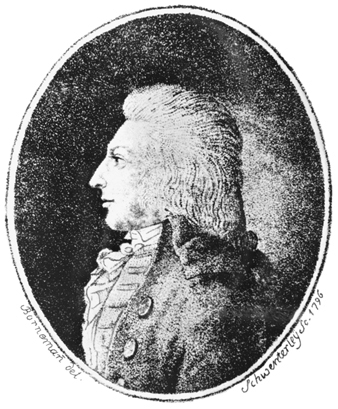
- Born: 31 December 1761; Cape of Good Hope, South Africa
- Died: 16 November 1836 (aged 75); Paris, France
- Known for: Establishing starting points for fungal taxonomy
- Scientific career
- Fields: Mycology, taxonomy
- Author abbrev. (botany): Pers.

Christiaan Hendrik Persoon (31 December 1761 – 16 November 1836) was a Cape Colony mycologist who is recognized as one of the founders of mycological taxonomy.

== Early life ==
Persoon was born in Cape Colony at the Cape of Good Hope, the third child of an immigrant Pomeranian father, Christiaan Daniel Persoon, and Dutch mother, Wilhelmina Elizabeth Groenwald. His mother died soon after he was born. In 1775, at the age of thirteen, he was sent to Europe for his education. His father died a year later in 1776.

== Education ==
Initially a student of theology at Halle, Persoon switched his studies to medicine, which he pursued in Leiden and then Göttingen. He received a doctorate from the Deutsche Akademie der Naturforscher in Erlangen 1799.

== Later years ==
He moved to Paris by 1803, where he spent the rest of his life, renting the upper floor of a house in a poor part of town. He was apparently unemployed, unmarried, poverty-stricken and a recluse, although he corresponded with botanists throughout Europe. Because of his financial difficulties, Persoon agreed to donate his herbarium to the House of Orange, in return for an adequate pension for life.

== Academic career ==
The origin of Persoon's botanical interest is unknown. The earliest of his works was Abbildungen der Schwämme (Illustrations of the fungi), published in three parts, in 1790, 1791, and 1793. In 1794, Persoon introduced the term lirella for the furrowed ascomata of the lichen genus Graphis. From 1805 to 1807, he published two volumes of his Synopsis plantarum, a popular work describing 20,000 species of all types of plants. But his pioneering work was in the fungi, for which he published several works, beginning with the Synopsis methodica fungorum (1801); it is the starting point for nomenclature of the Uredinales, Ustilaginales, and the Gasteromycetes. Persoon described many polypore species; most were from his own collections in central Europe, while several other tropical species were sent to him from collections made by French botanist Charles Gaudichaud-Beaupré during his circumglobal expedition. These latter fungi are among the first tropical polypores ever described. In 1815, Persoon was elected a corresponding member of the Royal Swedish Academy of Sciences.

Persoon was a prolific author of new fungal species, having formally described 2269 in his career.

== Recognition ==
The genus Persoonia, a variety of small Australian trees and shrubs, was named after him. The title Persoonia is also given to a biannual scientific journal of molecular phylogeny and evolution of fungi, published jointly by the National Herbarium of the Netherlands and the CBS Fungal Biodiversity Centre.

== See also ==
- Category:Taxa named by Christiaan Hendrik Persoon
