= Persoonia (journal) =

- Discipline: Mycology; Taxonomy; Evolutionary biology
- Language: English
- Edited by: József Geml; Pedro W. Crous

Publication details
- History: 1959–present
- Publisher: National Herbarium of the Netherlands; Centraalbureau voor Schimmelcultures (CBS) (The Netherlands)
- Frequency: Irregular
- Open access: Yes
- Impact factor: 11.658 (2021)

Standard abbreviations
- ISO 4: Persoonia

Indexing
- ISSN: 0031-5850
- OCLC no.: 1762127

Links
- Journal homepage; Online tables of contents

Persoonia is an English-language peer-reviewed scientific journal that publishes research within the disciplines of taxonomy, molecular systematics, and evolution of fungi. The journal, established in 1959, is edited by József Geml and Pedro W. Crous, and is published jointly by the National Herbarium of the Netherlands and the Centraalbureau voor Schimmelcultures (CBS) Fungal Biodiversity Centre.

== See also ==
- Christiaan Hendrik Persoon – the journal's namesake
- Mycotaxon – a journal with similar scope
