= Netherlands Mycological Society =

The Netherlands Mycological Society (Dutch: Nederlandse Mycologische Vereniging (NMV)) is the national society for the Netherlands promoting the study of fungi. It was founded in 1908 and currently has around 800 members. It publishes the journal Coolia as well as various other ad hoc publications, and organises national meetings, courses and mycological excursions.

The society is part of the Pan-European Species directories Infrastructure (PESI).
