= Naturalis Biodiversity Center =

Dutch natural history museum and research center

- Nederlands Centrum voor Biodiversiteit Naturalis
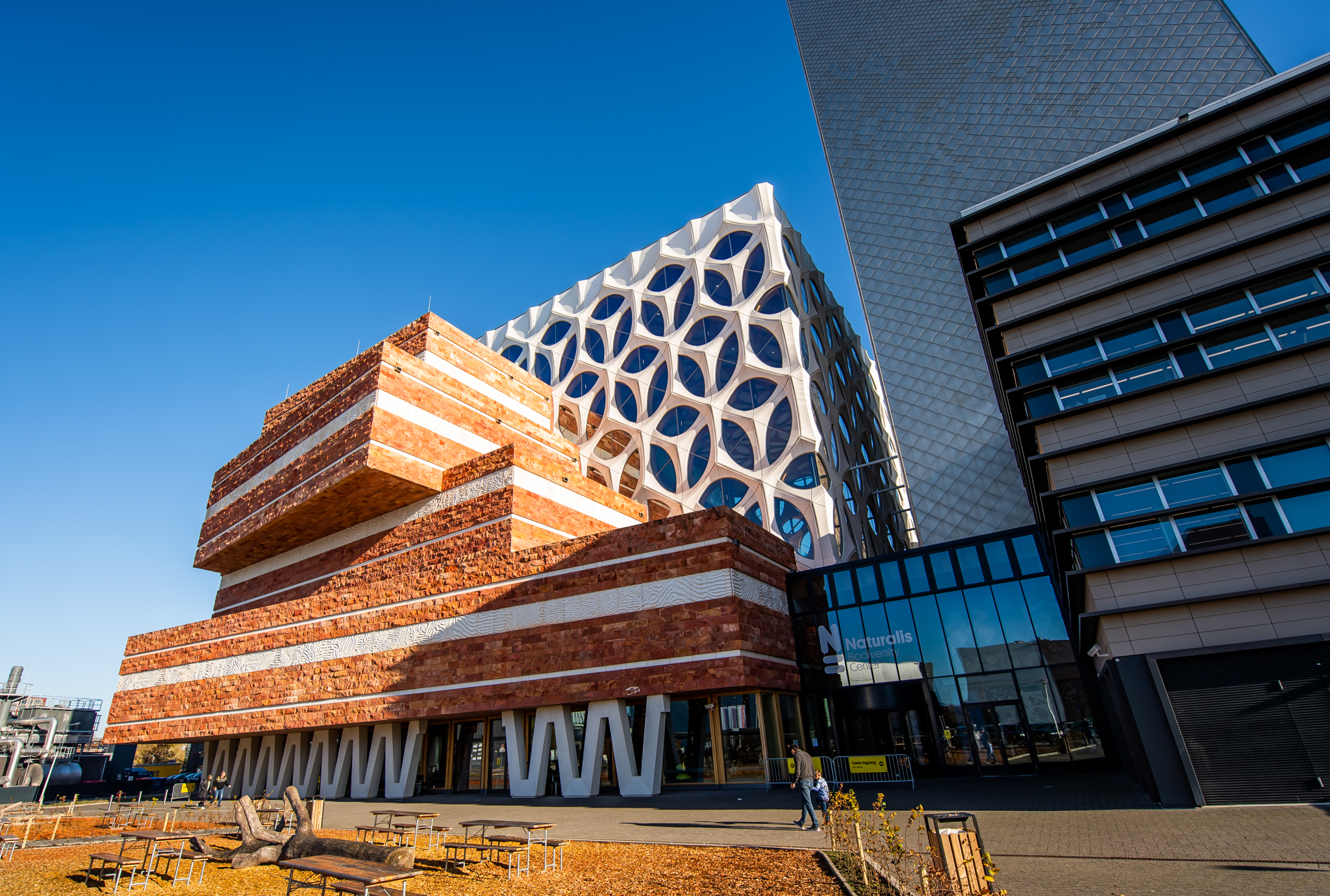

- Location within South Holland Location within Netherlands
- Established: 9 August 1820; 206 years ago
- Location: Darwinweg 2 Leiden, Netherlands
- Coordinates: 52°09′53″N 4°28′24″E
- Type: National museum Natural history museum Research center
- Collections: Zoology, botany, geology
- Collection size: 43 million objects
- Visitors: 440 thousand (2022)
- Director: Marcel Beukeboom
- Public transit access: Leiden Centraal/LUMC
- Parking: On site (paid)
- Website: www.naturalis.nl

Naturalis Biodiversity Center (Dutch: Nederlands Centrum voor Biodiversiteit Naturalis, Naturalis for short) is a national museum of natural history and a research center on biodiversity in Leiden, Netherlands. It was named the European Museum of the Year 2021. Although its current name and organization are relatively recent, the history of Naturalis can be traced back to the early 1800s. Its collection includes approximately 42 million specimens, making it one of the largest natural history collections in the world.

The stuffing of animals for private and scientific purposes (1978)

== History ==
The beginnings of Naturalis go back to the creation of the Rijksmuseum van Natuurlijke Historie (abbr. RMNH, 'National Museum of Natural History') by royal decree on 9 August 1820. In 1878, the geological and mineralogical collections of the museum were split off into a separate museum, remaining distinct until the merger of the Rijksmuseum van Natuurlijke Historie with the Rijksmuseum van Geologie en Mineralogie (abbr. RGM) in 1984, to form the Nationaal Natuurhistorisch Museum (NNM) or National Museum of Natural History.

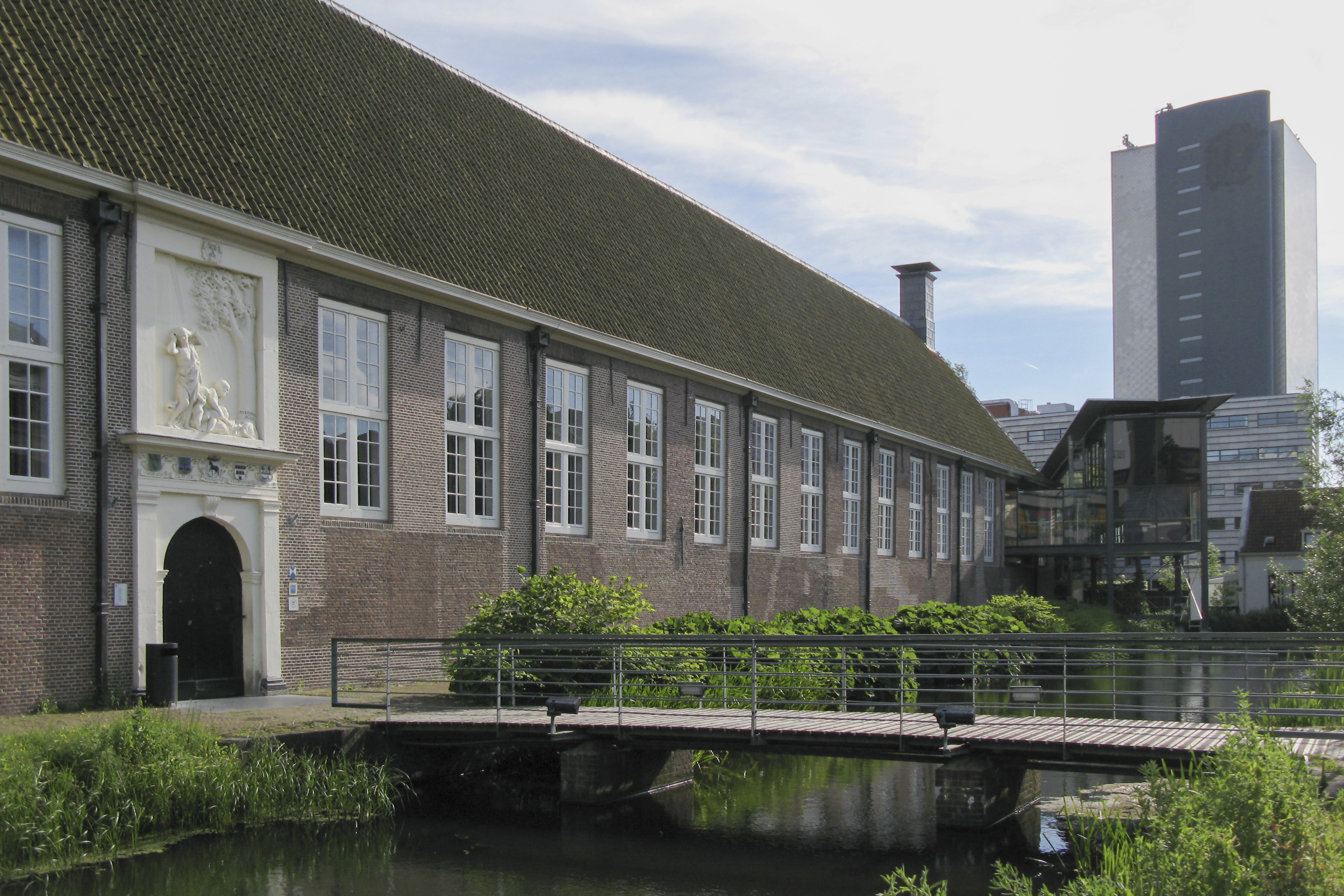
Former entry through the Pesthuis

In 1986, it was decided that the institution should become a public museum. A new building was designed by the Dutch architect Fons Verheijen. The building's reception area incorporated the 1657–1661 Pesthuis (historical plague hospital), designed by Huybert Corneliszoon van Duyvenvlucht. Completed in 1998, it was opened on 7 April 1998, by Queen Beatrix of the Netherlands. The new building costs were about €60 million, making it the second most expensive museum building in the Netherlands.

In 2010 the National Museum of Natural History (Naturalis) further combined with the Zoological Museum Amsterdam (ZMA) of the University of Amsterdam, and the National Herbaria at the universities of Leiden, Amsterdam, and Wageningen, to form the Nederlands Centrum voor Biodiversiteit (NCB Naturalis). The combined institute was formally opened as part of the 'International Year of Biodiversity 2010' by Education Minister Ronald Plasterk and Agriculture Minister Gerda Verburg.

In 2012 the name became the Naturalis Biodiversity Center. Naturalis has partnered with ETI Bioinformatics in support of the Catalog of Life (CoL), and is working with the Global Biodiversity Information Facility. Funding is in place to support digitization of the massed collections.

In 2015, further renovation and expansion was planned, with a proposed design from Neutelings Riedijk Architecten. The Pesthuis will no longer be part of the complex. However, a lawsuit by the previous architect postponed these plans. The museum, except the research facilities, was closed from September 2018 to mid 2019 due to renovations. Temporary exhibitions were held in the Pesthuis, the former entrance building, during the renovations. The new building was finished in the summer of 2019 with the museum opening again on 31 August of that year.

Within a year of the opening the museum had to close again in March 2020 due to the COVID-19 pandemic until June 2020. The museum reopened on 8 June with free entrance for essential workers. On 1 July the museum was reopened for the public charging full prices again. It closed again in the winters of 2020 and 2021 due to further national COVID-19 measures.

Naturalis was named the European Museum of the Year 2021 in the annual awards of the European Museum Forum. The jury cited Naturalis as "a very inventive museum with beautiful exhibitions", and also the museum's "agile ability" to move on and transform itself.

== Collection ==
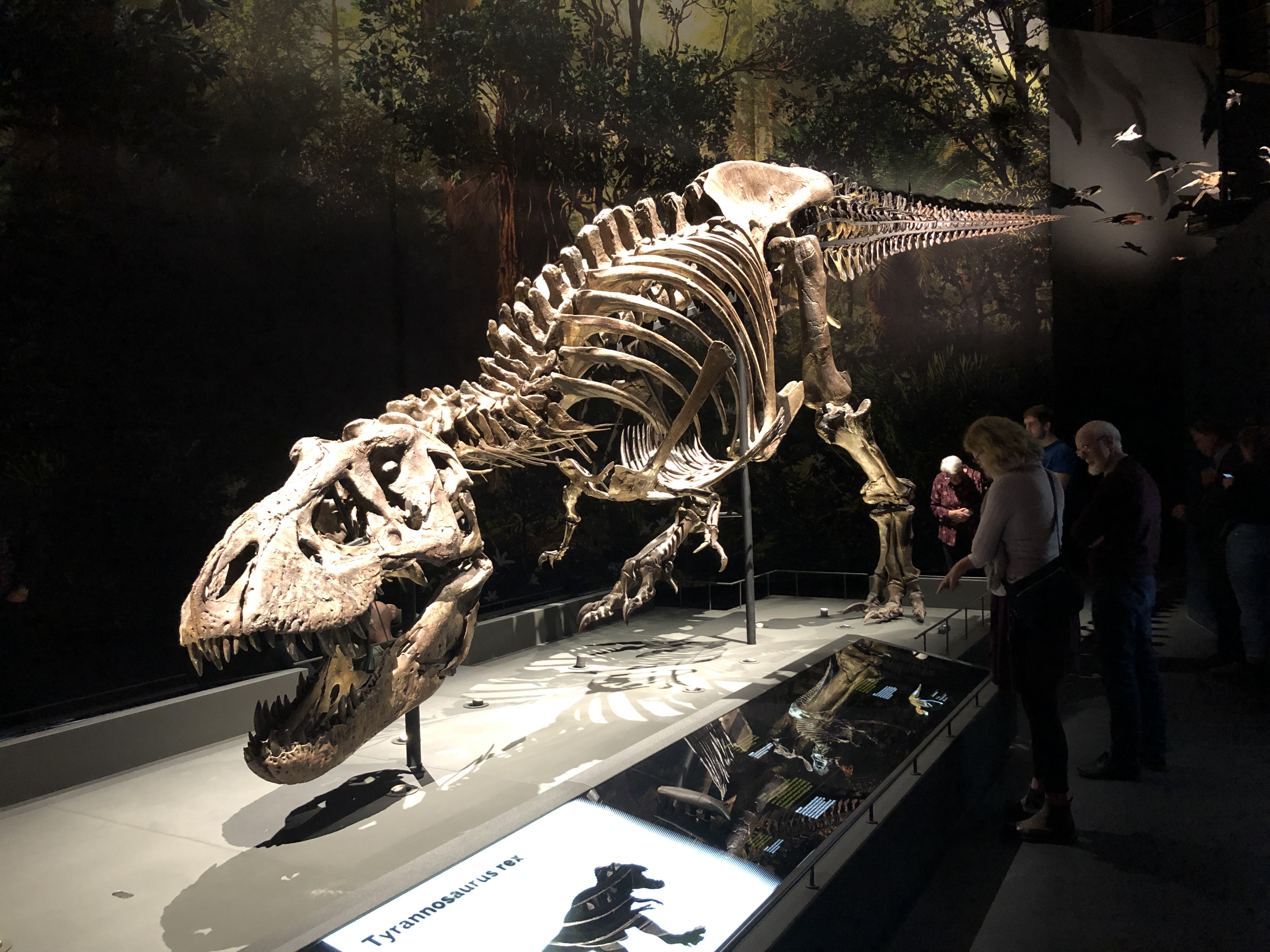
Trix, the Tyrannosaurus skeleton, has been part of the permanent collection since the reopening

The current museum is known for the numerous objects in its collections. Prior to the merger with the Zoölogisch Museum Amsterdam and National Herbarium of the Netherlands, there were approximately 10 million zoological and geological specimens in the Naturalis collection. Following the merger with the collections of the Zoölogisch Museum Amsterdam and National Herbarium of the Netherlands in 2010–12, there are now approximately 42 million specimens:

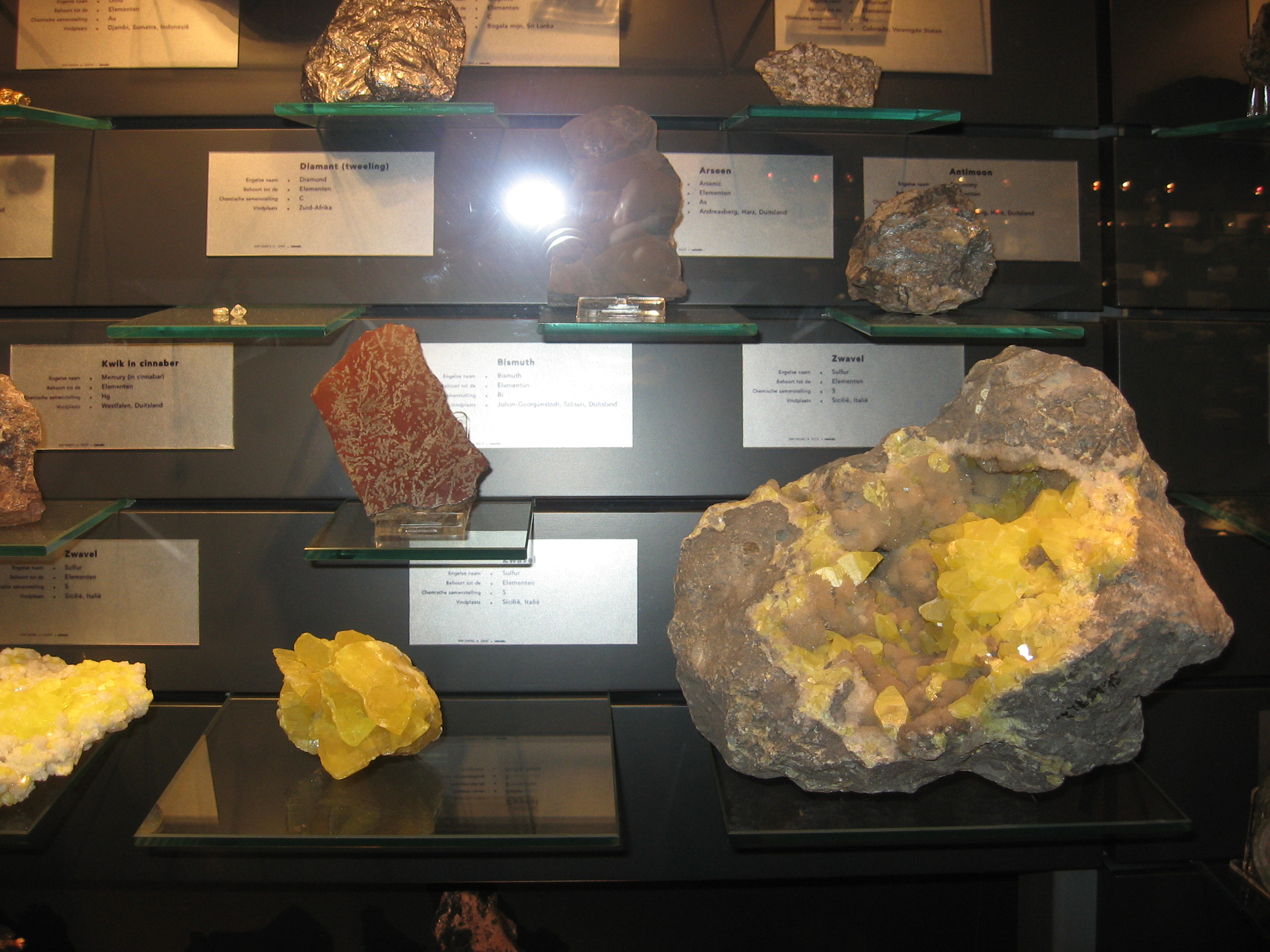
Former display of rocks and minerals

- 14,600,000 insects
- 8,000,000 mollusca
- 1,600,000 other invertebrates
- 615,000 vertebrates
  - 380,000 birds
  - 125,000 fish
  - 60,000 reptiles and amphibians
  - 50,000 mammals
- 9,100,000 fossils
- 500,000 rocks and minerals
- 4,900,000 vascular plants
- 705,000 mosses
- 282,000 lichens
- 135,000 ferns
- 350,000 fungi
- 250,000 algae
- 12,000 galls
- 6,000 slime molds
- 121,000 wood samples
- 140,000 books
- 14,000 scientific journal titles
- 57,000 prints and drawings
- 13,000 maps
- 91,500 microfiche
- 310.000 photographs, slides and glass negatives

The largest part of the collections are stored in a 60-meter-high tower, a landmark in Leiden, opened in April 1998. Some parts of the collections are stored in a depot in the former museum building at the Raamsteeg in the city center of Leiden.

The Index Herbariorum code assigned to Naturalis is L and it is used when citing housed herbarium specimens.

=== Explorers ===
Among the collections at Naturalis are the papers and field notes of a number of early travelers and naturalists, including the following:

- Heinrich Boie (1794‐1827)
- Pierre-Médard Diard (1794‐1863)
- Eltio Alegondas Forsten (1811‐1843)
- Johan Coenraad van Hasselt (1797‐1823)
- Ludwig Horner (1811‐1838)
- Franz Wilhelm Junghuhn (1809‐1864)
- Pieter Willem Korthals (1807‐1892)
- Heinrich Kuhl (1797‐1821)
- Heinrich Christian Macklot (1799‐1832)
- Salomon Müller (1804‐1863)
- Pieter van Oort (1804‐1834)
- Carl Schwaner (1817‐1851)
- Alexander Zippelius (1797‐1828)

== Exhibitions ==
=== Permanent exhibitions ===
The museum has several permanent exhibitions:

- Live Science (a highly interactive gallery dedicated to displaying the institute's function as science center and collection depot to the public)
- Life (provides a tour along multiple biotopes, from the deep sea to the sky, showing mounted specimens and replica's of the highlights of the Earth's present fauna)
- Earth (exhibits the way human culture is entangled with system earth. Artefacts and minerals from four regions with high geological activity, Hawaii, Japan, Brazil, and Iceland, are displayed surrounded by a panorama that combines the environment of these regions)
- Dinosaur Era (Exhibits a selection of fossils from the Palaeozoic and mainly the Mesozoic period with a focus on dinosaurs. The highlight of the gallery is Trix which is one of the most complete and best preserved Tyrannosaurus skeletons found so far. On top of that, Trix is one of the two only authentic tyrannosaurs that are permanently kept in Europe. The other one is Tristan, which belongs to a Danish proprietor albeit being currently on exhibit at the Natural History Museum, Berlin, in Germany.)
- Rexperience (an immersive experience where visitors travel back to the time T. rex Trix roamed the Earth)
- Ice Age (dedicated to the Netherlands during the last ice age, a large scale model showcases the Dutch landscape and its fauna of that time, a large collection of Dutch Pleistocene fossils is exhibited as well as full skeletons of mammals from that time, including a woolly mammoth)
- Early Humans (a homage to Dutch scientist Eugène Dubois and his discovery of the Java Man (Homo erectus) which are kept at Naturalis. The holotype Trinil 2 is on display here.)
- Evolution (a gallery dedicated to evolution: the process by which species emerge and adapt)
- Seduction (showcases procreation in Nature, it illustrates the rituals of courting, coupling, and raising offspring in a playful way)
- Death (a gallery dedicated to circle of life)

=== Temporary exhibitions ===
During the renovation of the main building the former entrance building, the historic Pesthuis, was used for three temporary exhibits from 2016 to 2018.

- T-rex in Town (before Trix entered permanent exhibition at the Museum, the skeleton was exhibited at the Pesthuis from 10 September 2016 to 5 June 2017).
- Op Expeditie met Naturalis (English: Expedition with Naturalis, a summer holiday program aimed to involve children with science and nature from 24 June to 10 September 2017)
- GIF! (English: VENOM!, an exhibit with live animals, centred around the popular Dutch biologist and Naturalis researcher Freek Vonk, showing the different kinds of venom and poison in nature from 14 October 2017 to 2 September 2018)
- Treasure Trove (In 2020, Naturalis celebrated its 200th anniversary. There were 25 masterpieces from the collection in this anniversary exhibition.)
- Triceratops: The Herd (an exhibition on Triceratops, featuring an entire herd) 18 October 2024 – 31 August 2025

=== Virtual museum ===
During the COVID-19 pandemic the museum was made virtually accessible. The visitor can move freely through the exhibitions with information and short videos available in Dutch or English to add context to some of the museum's highlights.

== Visitors ==
Year	Visitors	Year	Visitors
2008	245,275	2012	251,500
2009	266,000	2013	307,500 (est.)
2010	270,000	2014	300,000 (est.)
2011	273,000	2015	339,550

Naturalis had an estimated 285,000 visitors and was the 15th most visited museum of the Netherlands in 2013. The museum had a record number of 440,000 visitors in 2022

== Research institute ==
Besides its role as a museum, Naturalis is also a scientific research institute collaborating with most Dutch universities. In 2012, around 200 researchers and some 200 guest researchers worked on topics such as biodiversity, botany, marine biology, or geology. Naturalis is a (co-) initiator of several citizen science projects. The staff also provide university education and develop complementary curricula and guest lectures.

In 2012–2016, in addition to the usual systematic work, the institute investigates the following themes: character evolution, interactions between species and dynamic biodiversity.

In ARISE, Naturalis is working on the largest research project in its history: an infrastructure to know and recognize all Dutch species.

== Buildings ==
New building

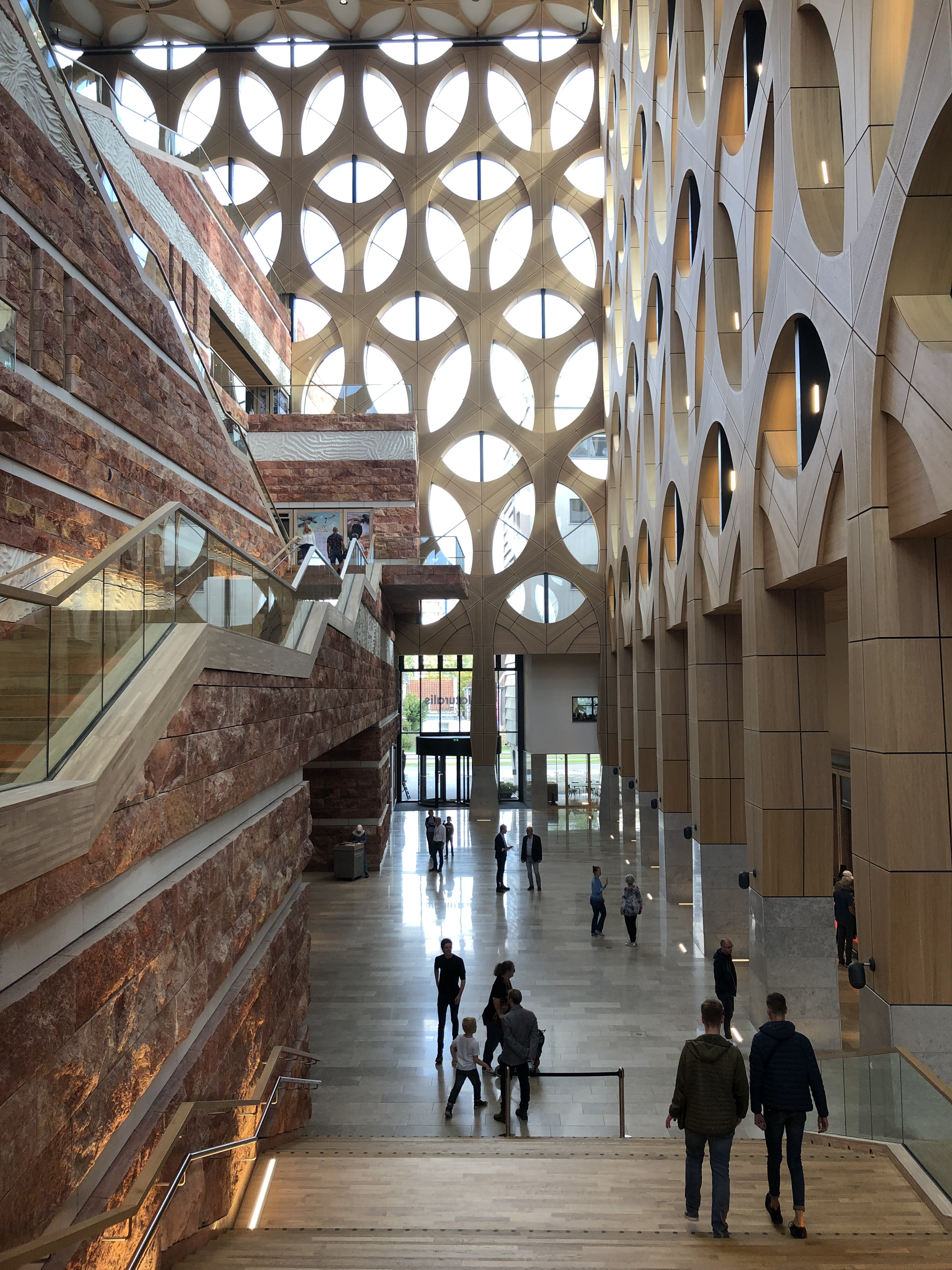
Atrium of the new building

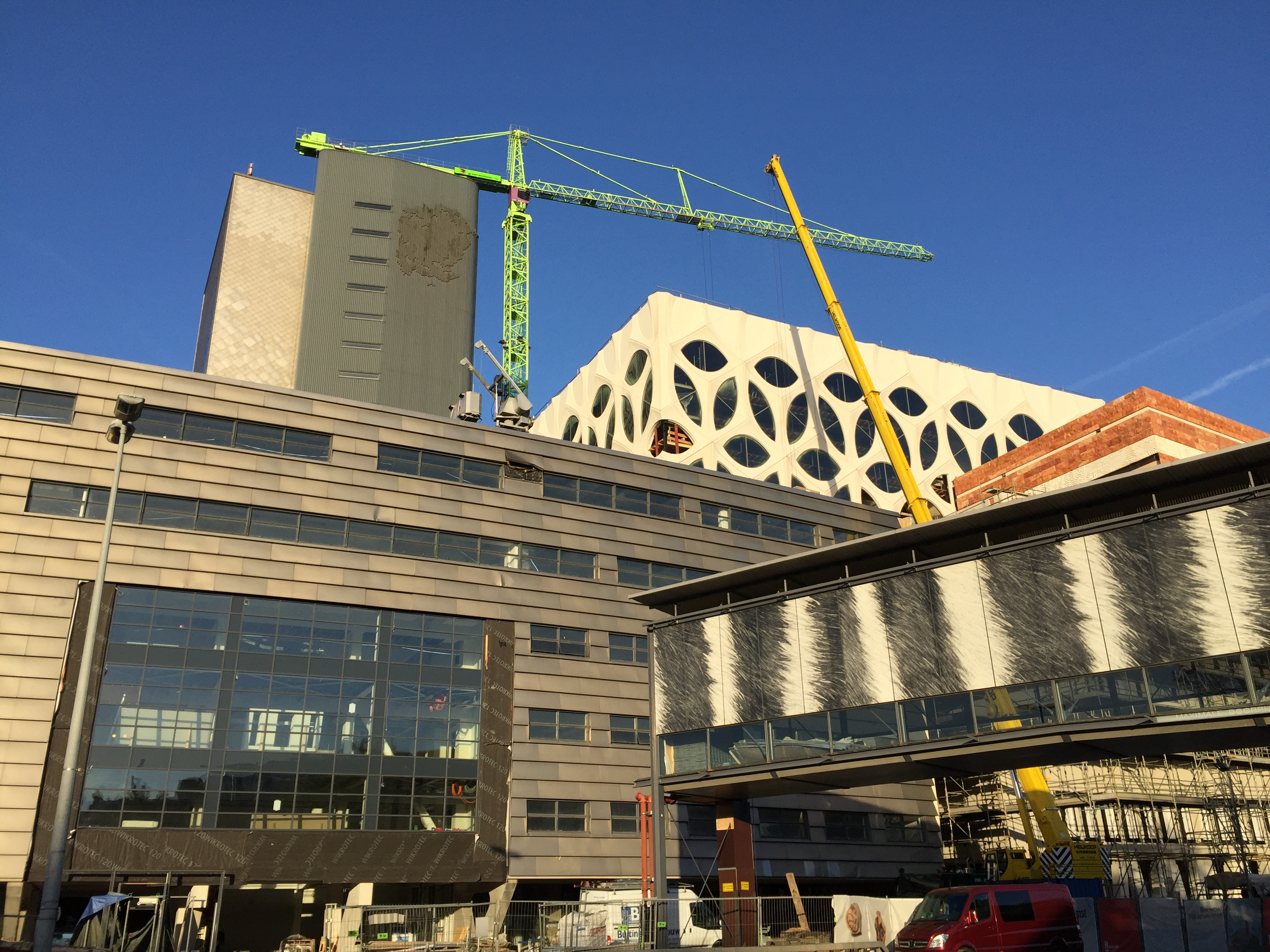
Construction of the new building

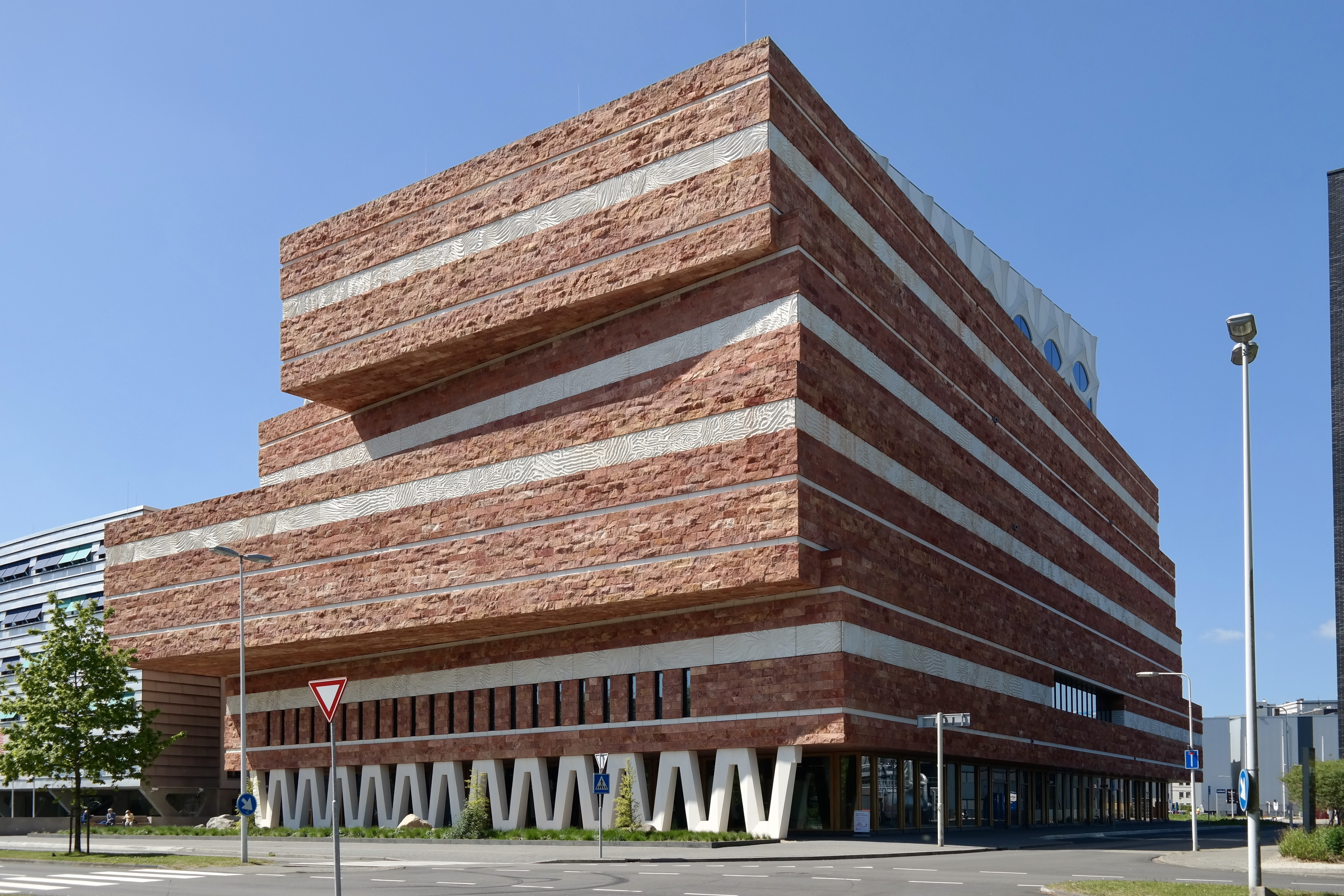
The new building in 2022
Former buildings

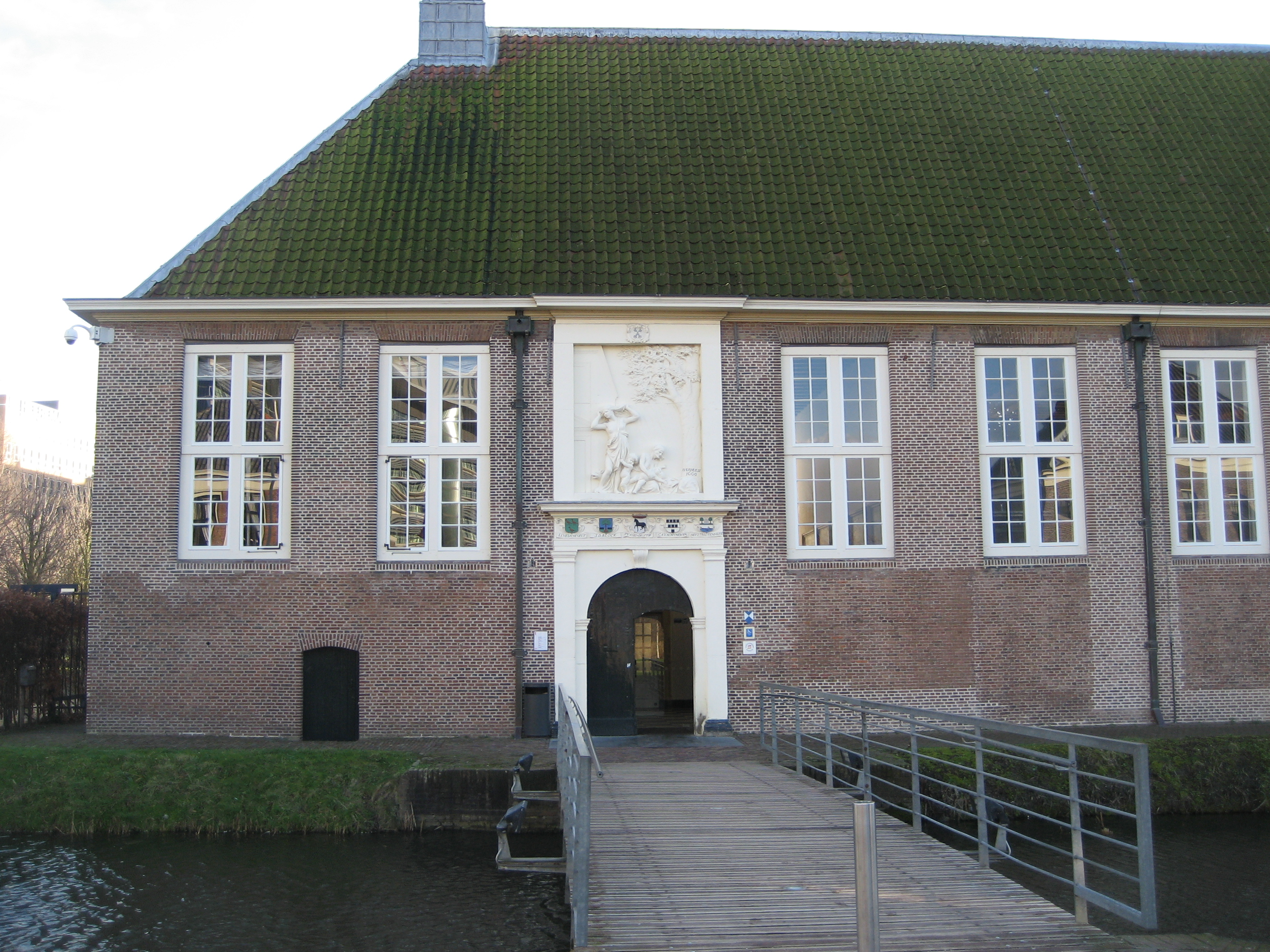
Entrance Naturalis (Pesthuis/plague house)

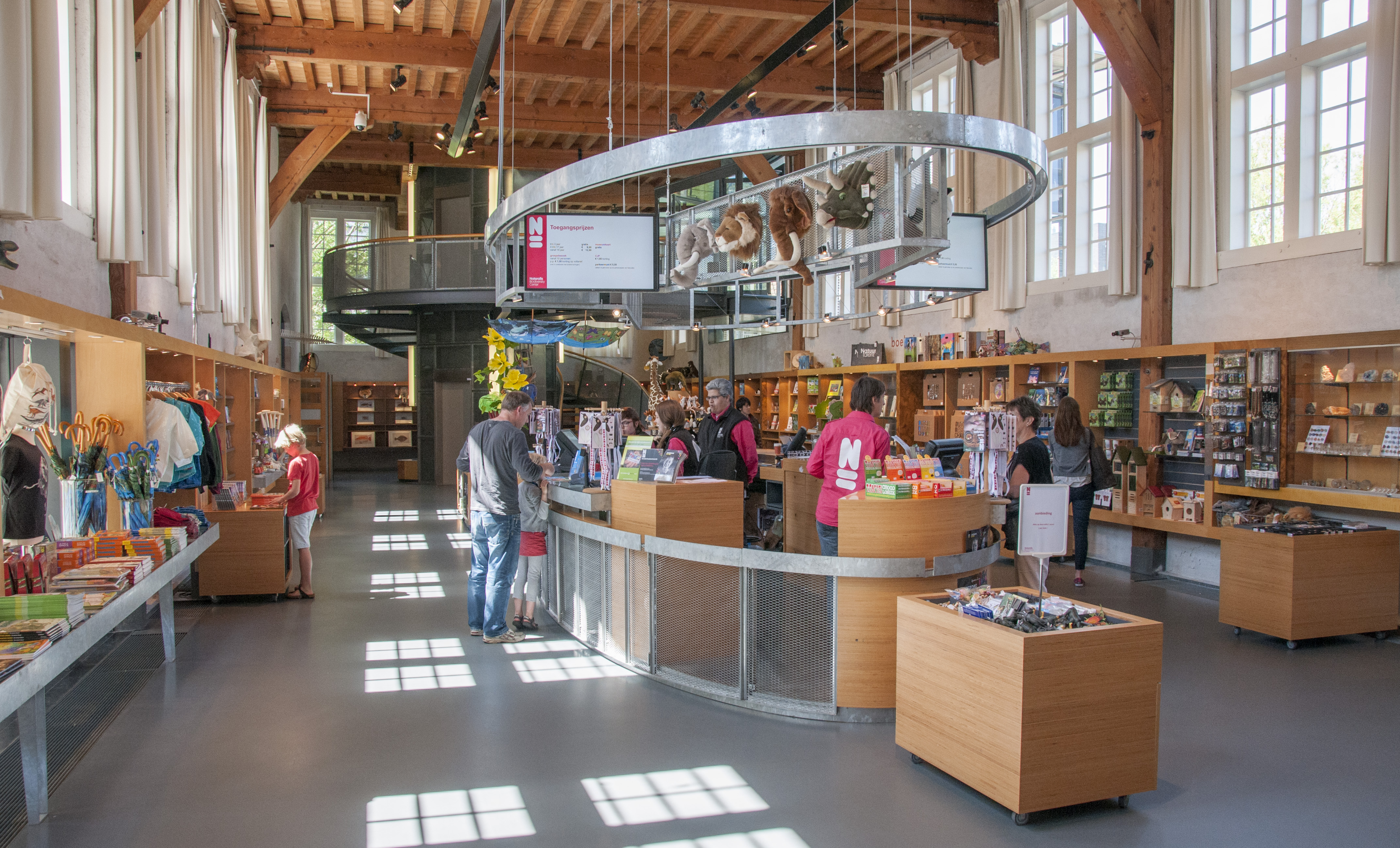
Cash register Naturalis (Pesthuis)

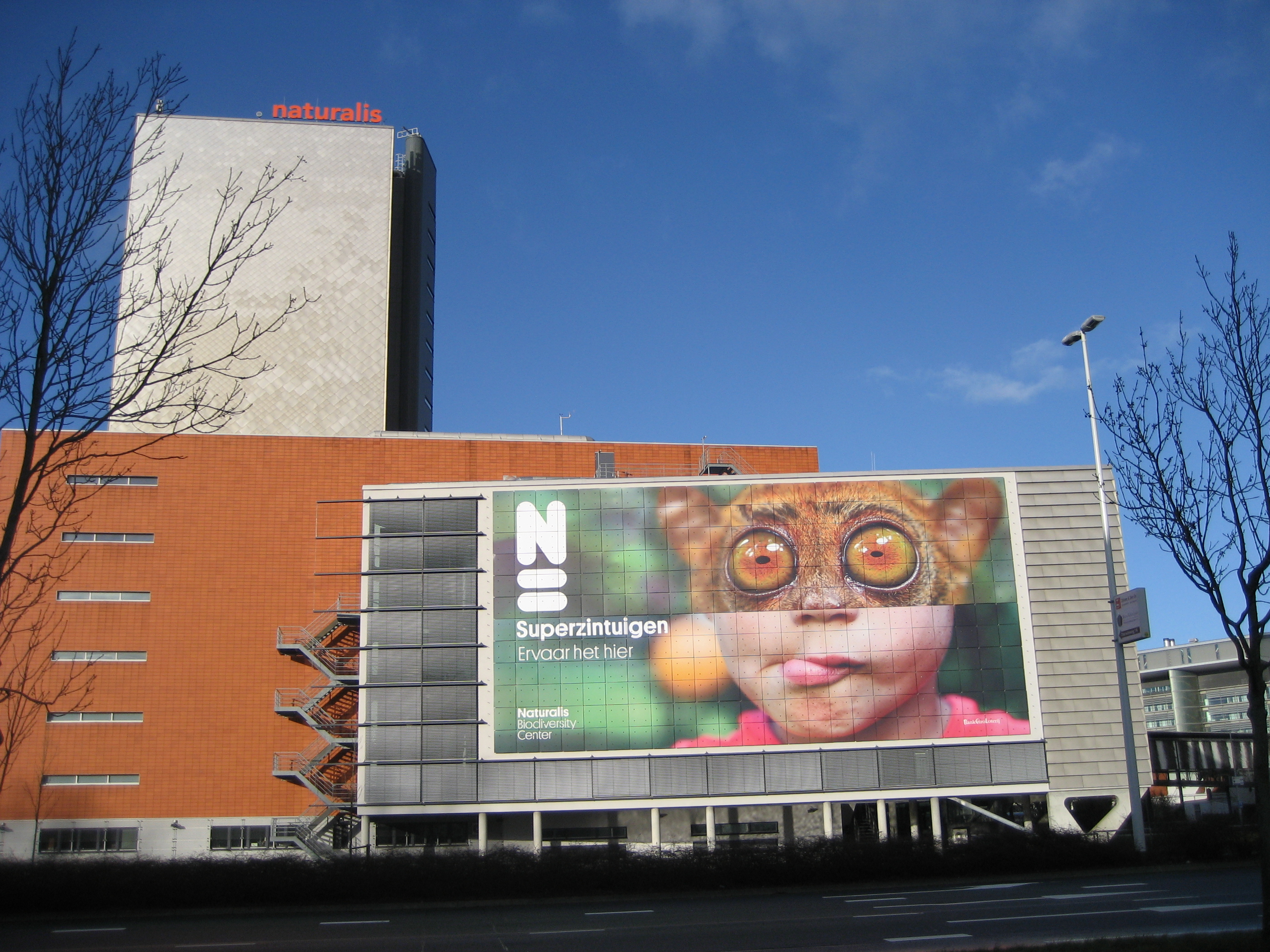
Naturalis (Museum and Collections) [2013]

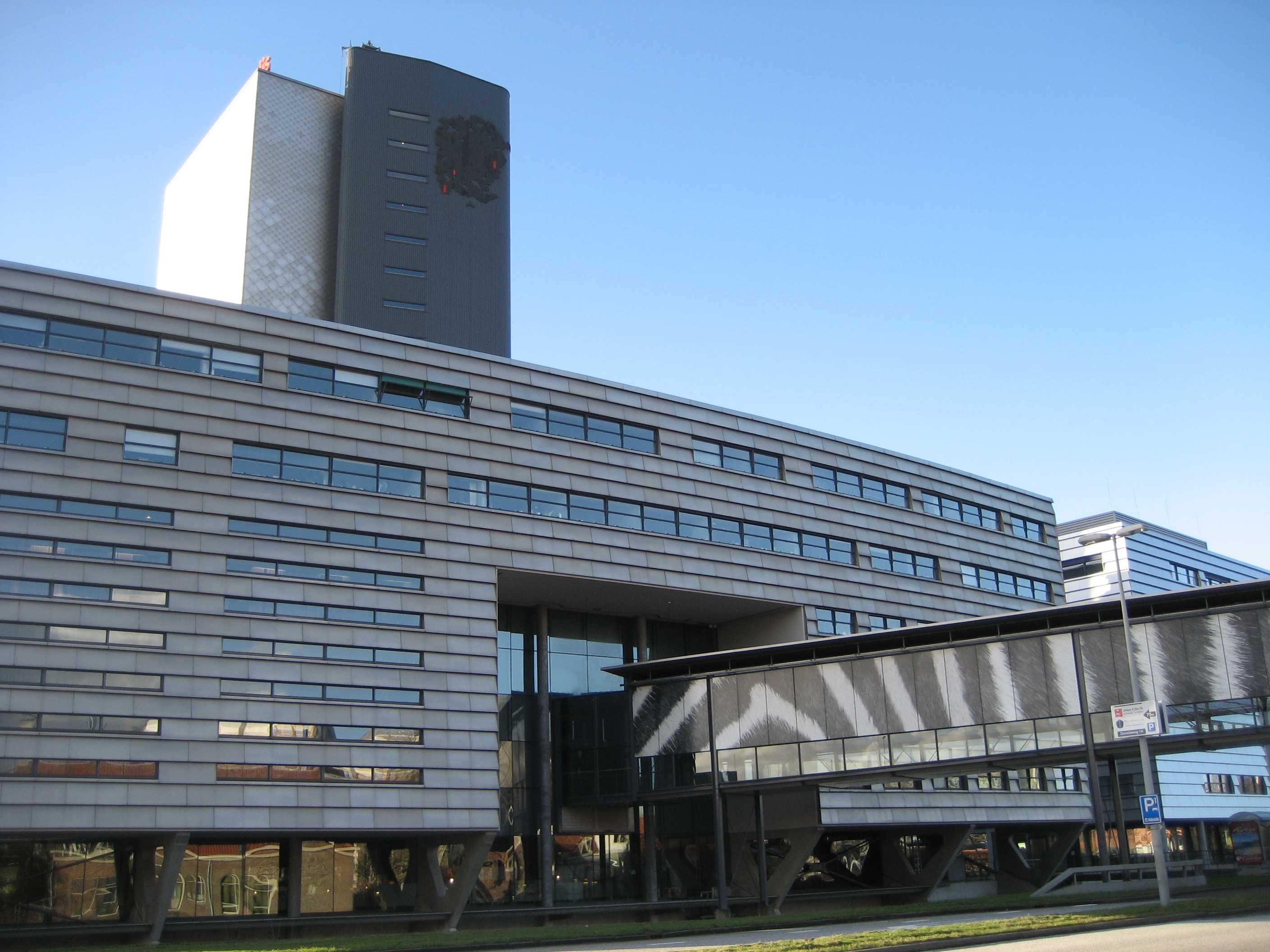
Naturalis (bridge with zebra pattern at right)

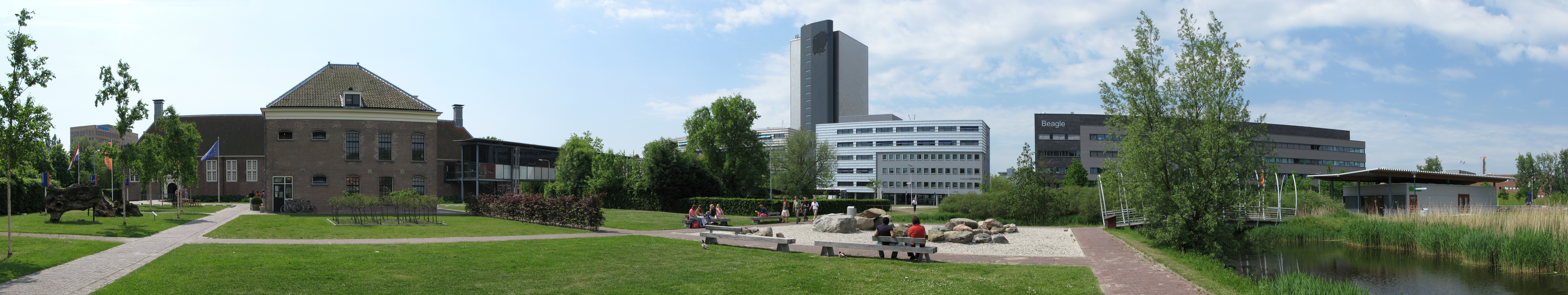
Panorama with Pesthuis, main museum building and Darwin House

== Exhibits ==
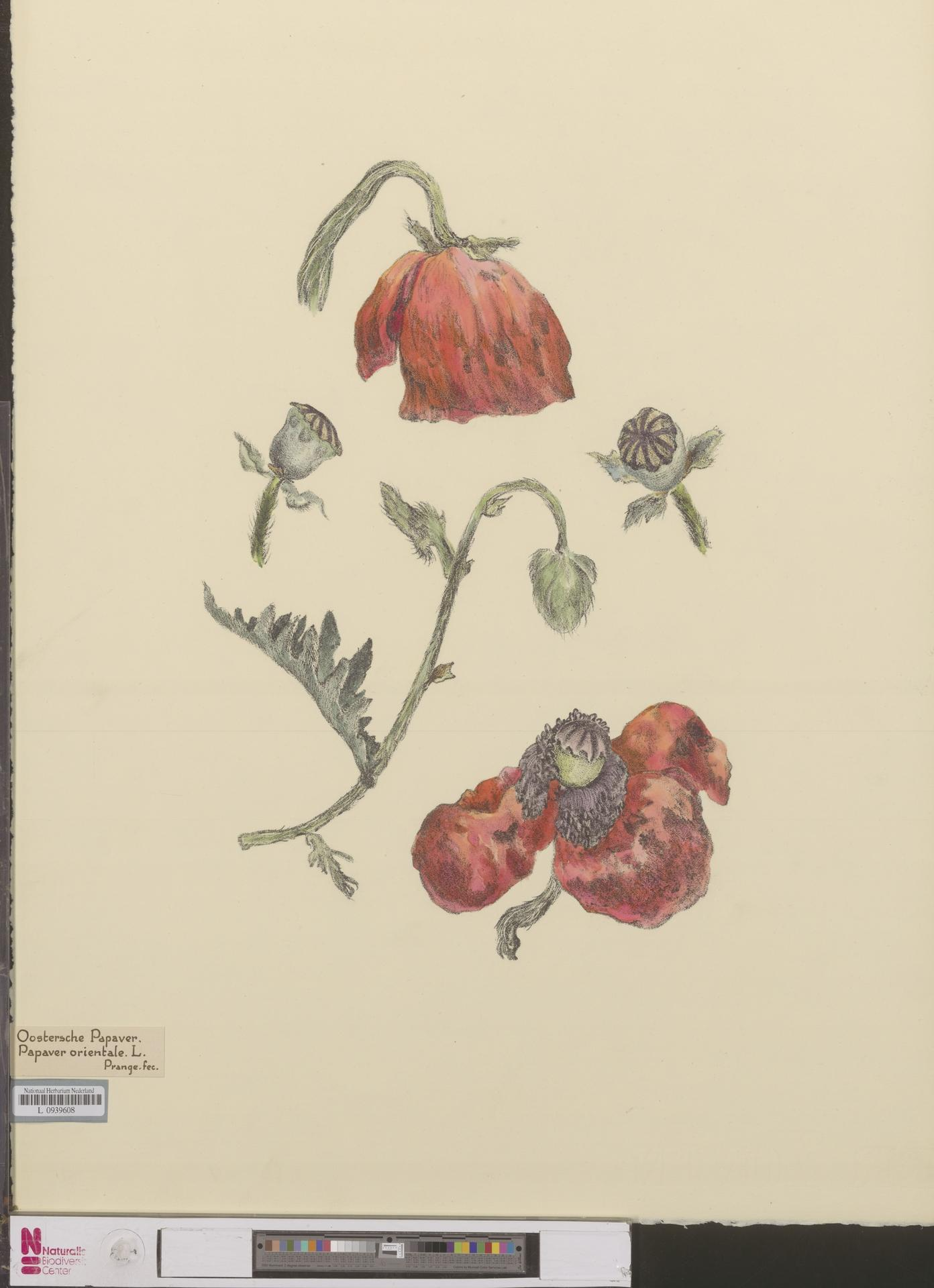
Papaver orientale, J. M. Prange

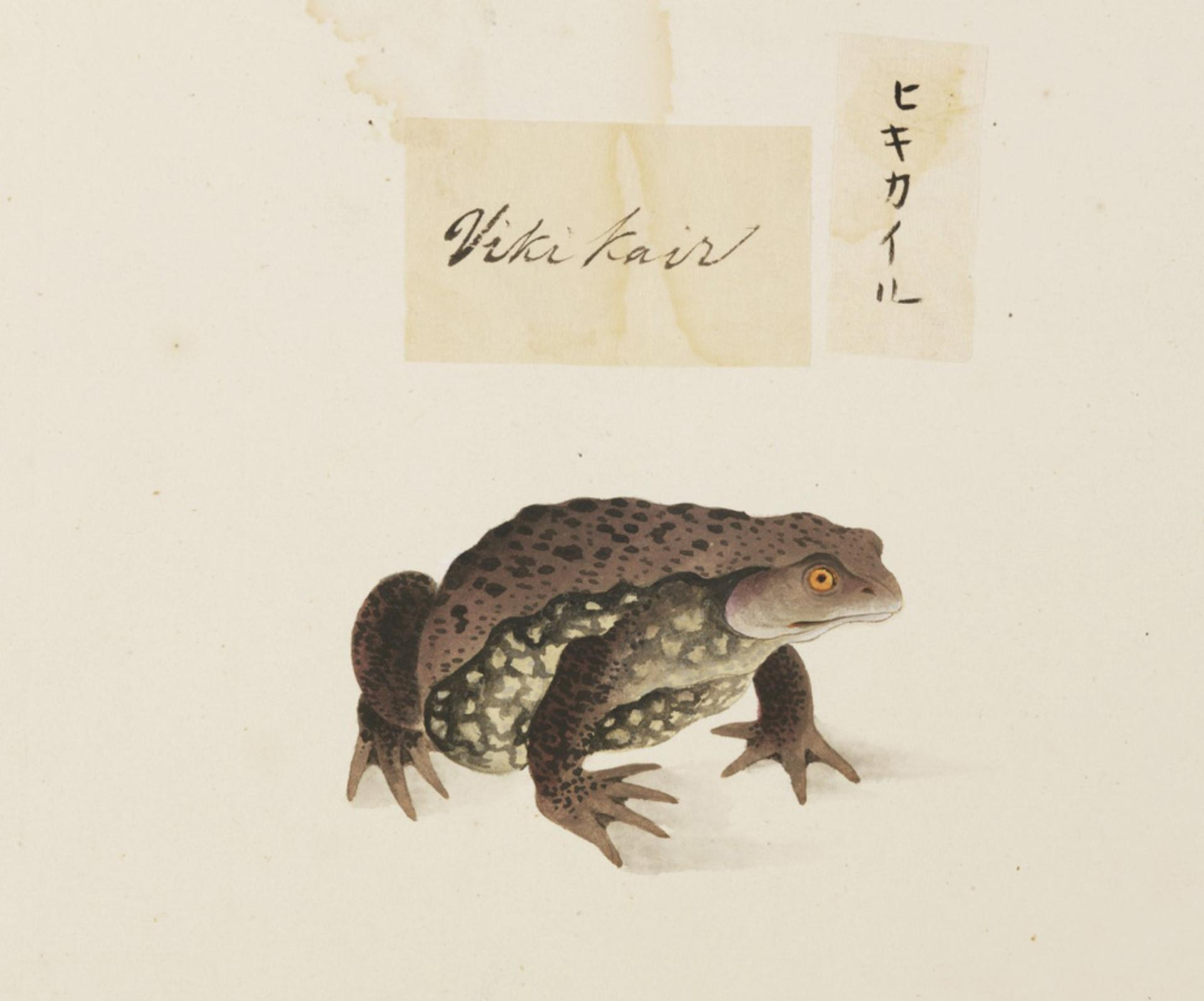
Bufo japonicus, Yūshi Ishizaki

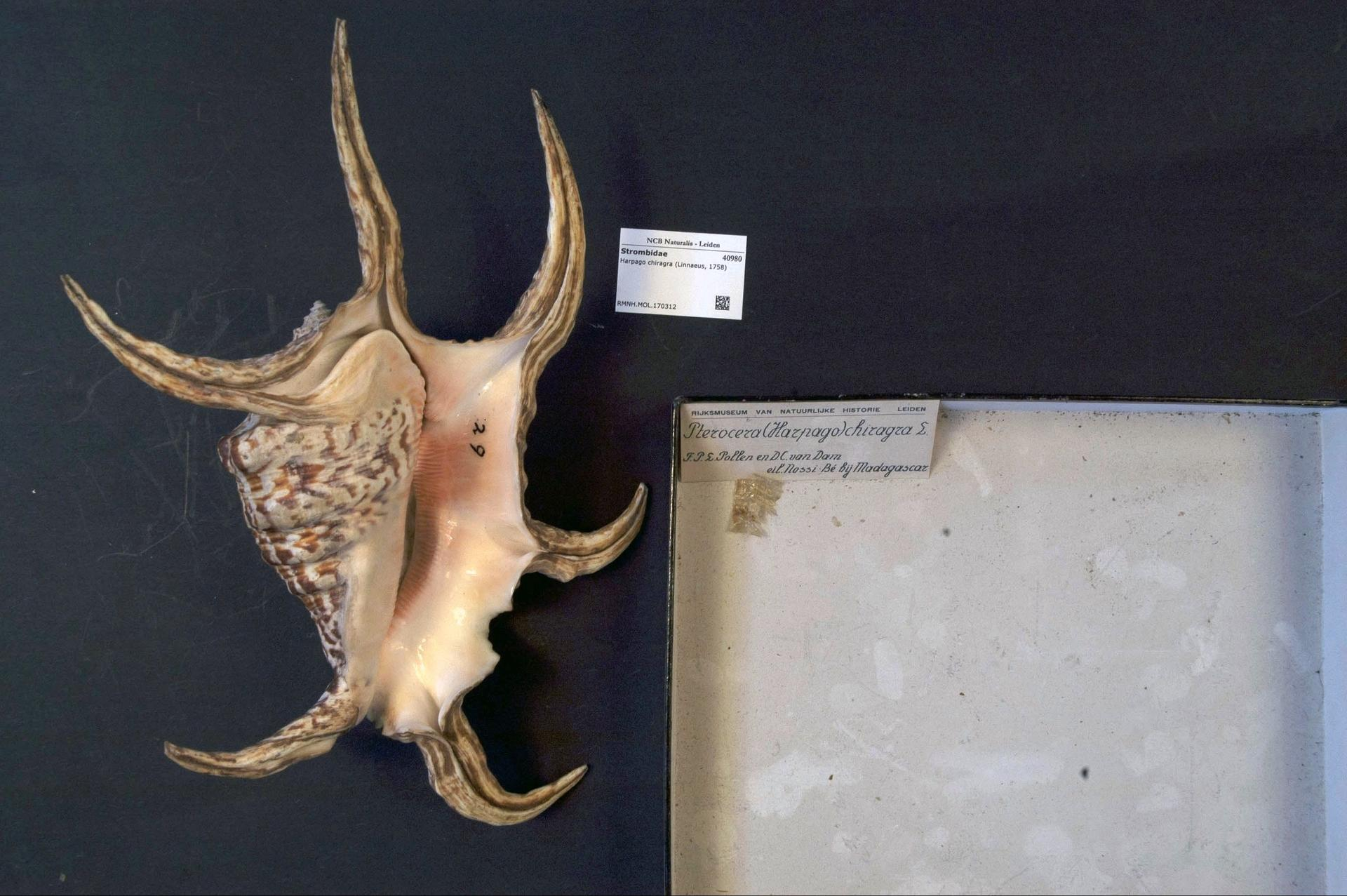
Harpago chiragra, marine gastropod

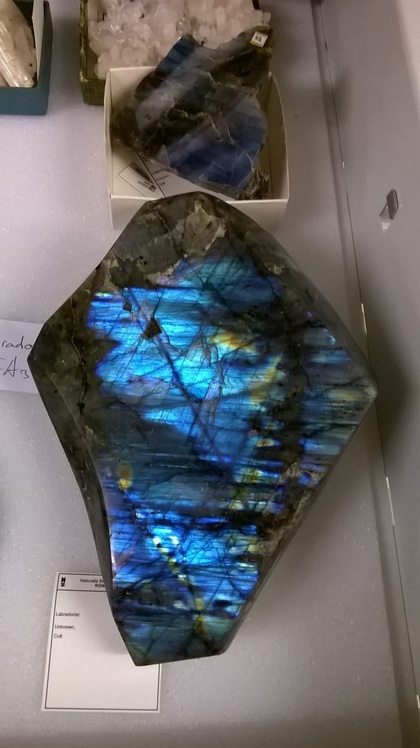
Labradorite

Hispaniolan or Cuban Macaw (extinct)

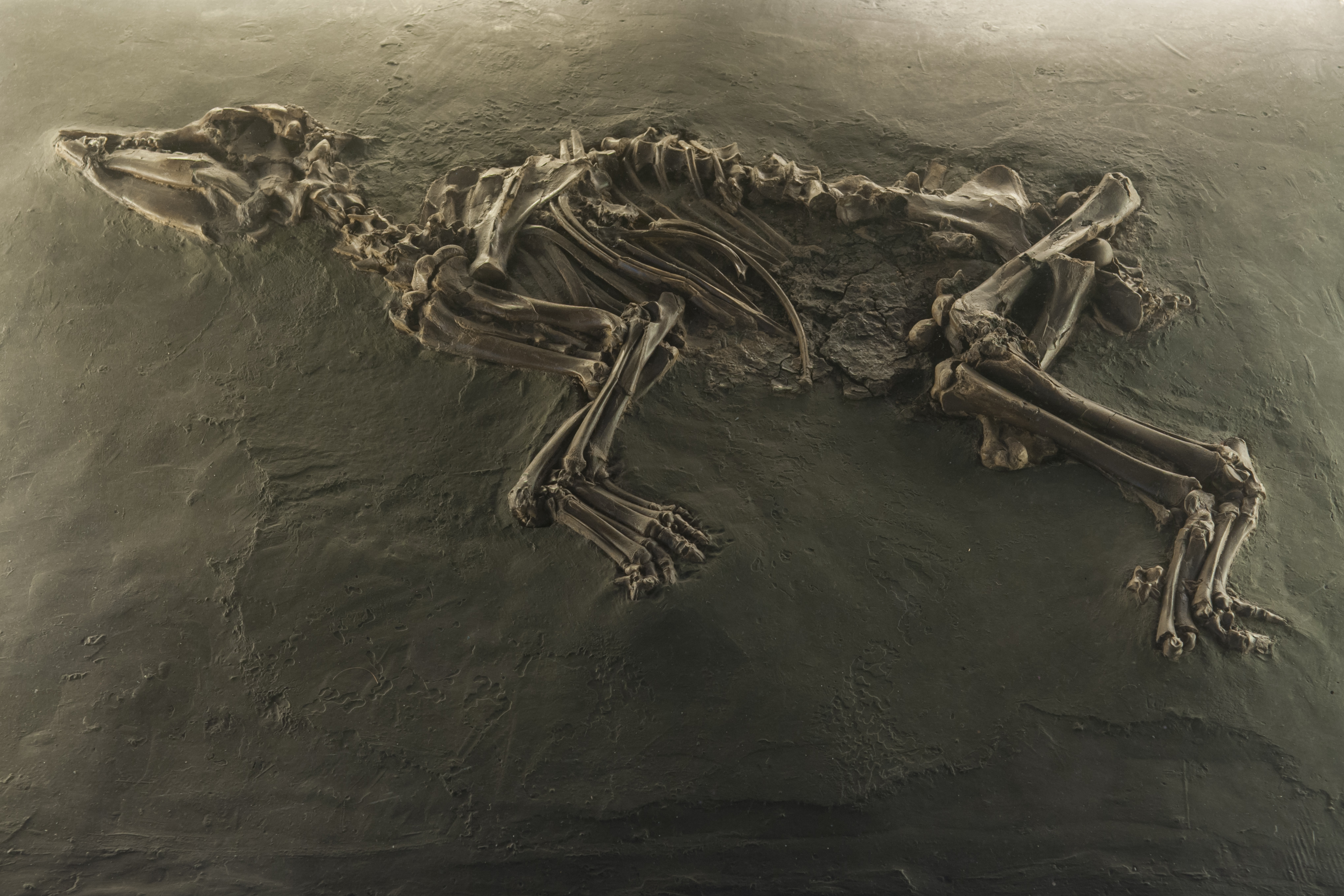
Propalaeotherium fossil

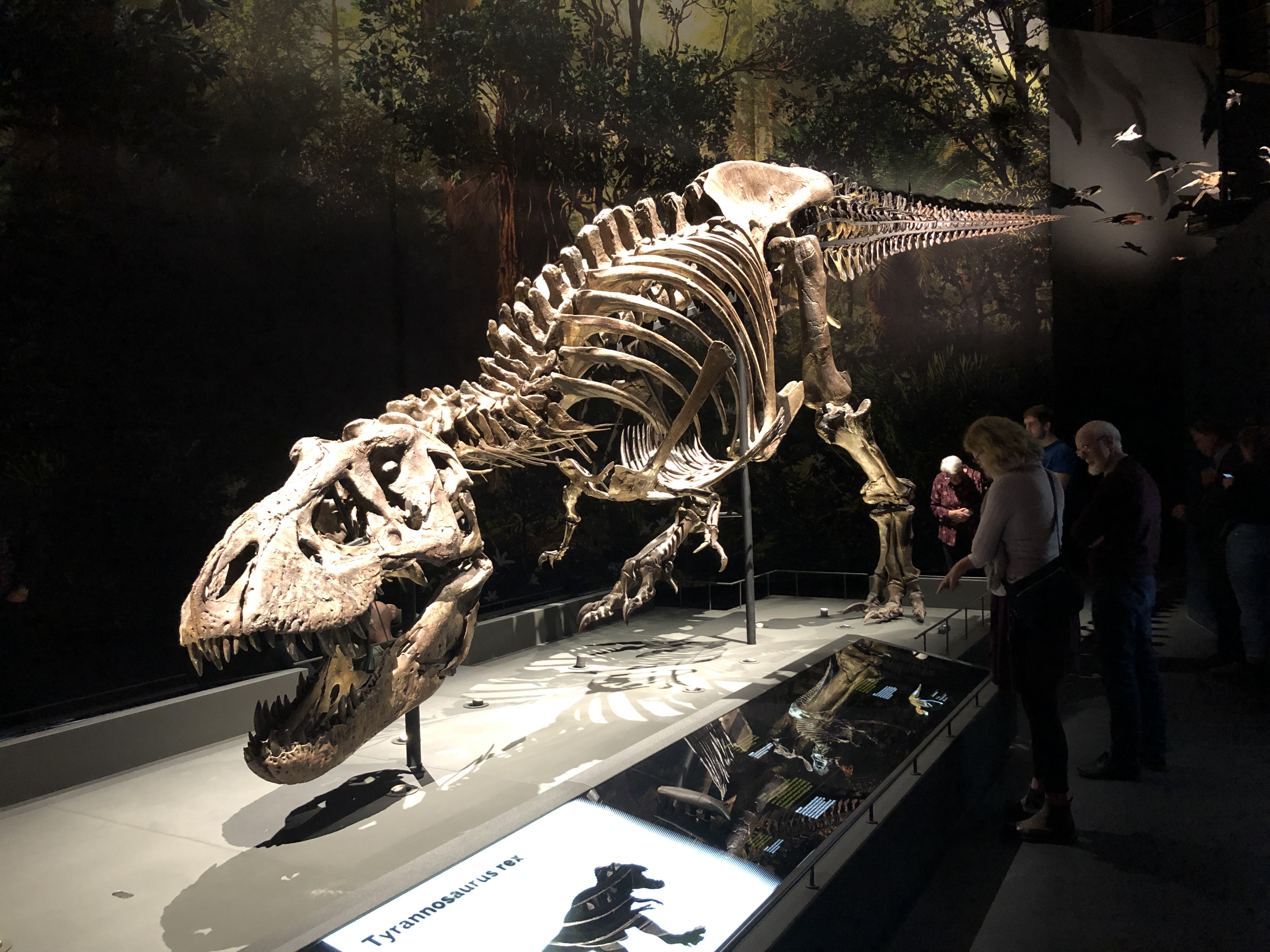
Tyrannosaurus rex Trix fossil in its permanent exhibition room
