= Victoria mattogrossensis =

Scientific classification
- Kingdom: Plantae
- Clade: Tracheophytes
- Clade: Angiosperms
- Order: Nymphaeales
- Family: Nymphaeaceae
- Genus: Victoria
- Species: V. mattogrossensis

Binomial name
- Victoria mattogrossensis (Malme) Magdalena & C.Martel

Synonyms
- Victoria cruziana f. mattogrossensis Malme

Species of plant

Victoria mattogrossensis is a species of plant in the family Nymphaeaceae endemic to the Pantanal. It is vulnerable to extinction.

== Description ==
=== Vegetative characteristics ===
The maroon to red rim of mature leaves is strongly recurved over the adaxial leaf surface, and is curling inwards or flared at the apex.

=== Generative characteristics ===
The flower bud has a convex apex. The entire surface of the green or maroon abaxial side of the outer tepals is covered in 300–1000 evenly spaced, 1–4 mm long prickles, which abruptly taper to a point. While still within the bud and within the first night, the innermost tepals display a white colouration. The ovary bears 2–15 mm long prickles, which are abruptly tapering to a point. The upper part of the carpellary appendages is smaller than the lower part, which is straight and partly free at the base. The fruit bears globose, 6–10 mm long, and 10 mm wide seeds with a prominent raphe.

== Taxonomy ==
It was fist described as Victoria cruziana f. mattogrossensis Malme by Gustaf Oskar Andersson Malme in 1907. It was elevated to a species as Victoria mattogrossensis (Malme) Magdalena & C.Martel by Carlos Magdalena and Carlos Martel in 2026. The lectotype, which was designated in 2022, was collected near Corumba, Matto Grosso do Sul, Brazil in July 1894. It is largely regarded as a synonym of Victoria cruziana, but is genetically distinct from it, despite sharing morphological similarities. There is also a large geographical separation between Victoria mattogrossensis and Victoria cruziana.

=== Etymology ===
The specific epithet mattogrossensis refers to Mato Grosso, Brazil.

== Distribution and habitat ==
Victoria mattogrossensis is endemic to the Pantanal.

== Conservation ==
Victoria mattogrossensis is vulnerable to extinction, as it has a small native range, which has also experienced extreme drought during the last decade.

== Uses ==
The seeds of Victoria mattogrossensis are ground with a pestle into a starch in the Pantanal region of Brazil.
