= Rio de Janeiro Botanical Garden =

Botanical garden

- Portuguese: Instituto de Pesquisas Jardim Botânico do Rio de Janeiro

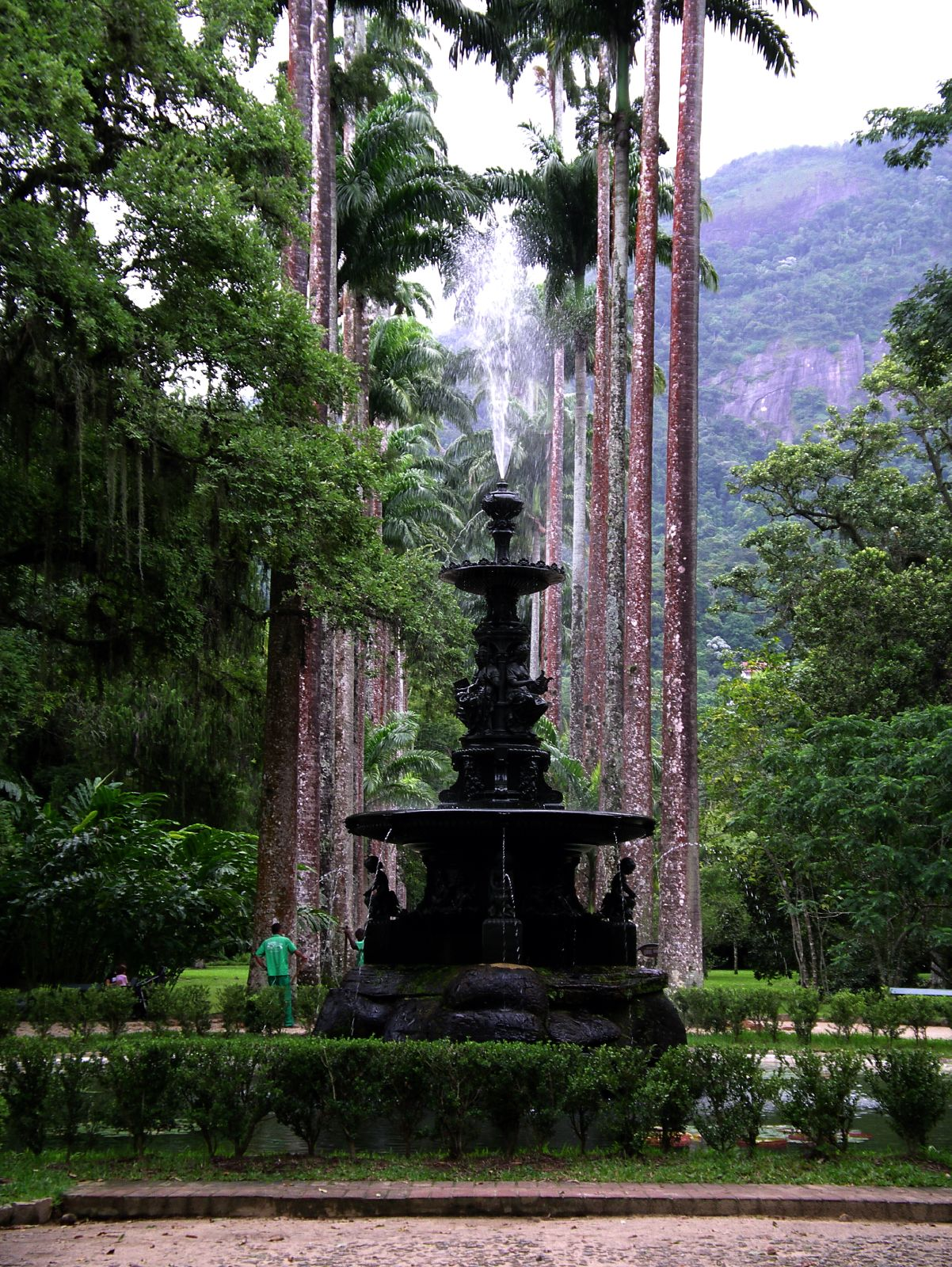

Agency overview
- Formed: June 13, 1808
- Headquarters: Rio de Janeiro, Brazil; 22°58′03″S 43°13′26″W
- Parent agency: Ministry of the Environment
- Website: www.jbrj.gov.br

The Rio de Janeiro Botanical Garden or Jardim Botânico is located at the Jardim Botânico district in the South Zone of Rio de Janeiro.

The Botanical Garden shows the diversity of Brazilian and foreign flora. There are around 6,500 species (some endangered) distributed throughout an area of 54 hectares (130 acres) as well as numerous greenhouses. The garden also houses monuments of historical, artistic, and archaeological significance. There is an important research center, which includes the most complete library in the country specializing in botany with over 32,000 volumes.

It was founded in 1808 by King John VI of Portugal. Originally intended for the acclimatization of spices like nutmeg, pepper and cinnamon imported from the West Indies, the garden was opened to the public in 1822, and is now open during daylight hours every day except 25 December and 1 January.

The 140 hectares (350 acres) park lies at the foot of the Corcovado Mountain, far below the right arm of the statue of Christ the Redeemer and contains more than 6,000 different species of tropical and subtropical plants and trees, including 900 varieties of palm trees. A 750 metres (2,460 ft) line of 134 palms forms the Avenue of Royal Palms leading from the entrance into the gardens. These palms all descended from a single tree, the Palma Mater, long since destroyed by lightning. Only about 40% of the park is cultivated, the remainder being Atlantic Forest rising up the slopes of Corcovado. The park is protected by the Patrimônio Histórico e Artístico Nacional and was designated as a biosphere reserve by UNESCO in 1992.

The Botanical Garden has an important research institute, which develops a wide range of botanical studies in Brazil. The institute has taxonomists who specialize in the identification and conservation of the neotropical flora.

The gardens house collections that include bromeliads, orchids, carnivorous plants, and cacti. These include Brazil’s largest botanical library and collections of dried fruits, rare Brazilian plants, and many photographs. The painted cast-iron Fountain of the Muses was made in Derby, UK, and until 1895 was sited at Henrique Lage's villa at Largo da Lapa, as part of the landscaping by the English painter John Tydall.

The park contains 140 species of birds, many of which have become accustomed to humans and are consequently much easier to observe than in the wild. These include the channel-billed toucan, rusty-margined guan, slaty-breasted wood rail and the endangered endemic white-necked hawk. Capuchin monkeys and tufted-eared marmosets are also frequently seen in the Botanical Gardens.

Features of interest include an old gunpowder factory, the Victoria lilies in the Lago Frei Leandro pond, the Japanese Garden, and many sculptures and fountains.

== Gallery ==
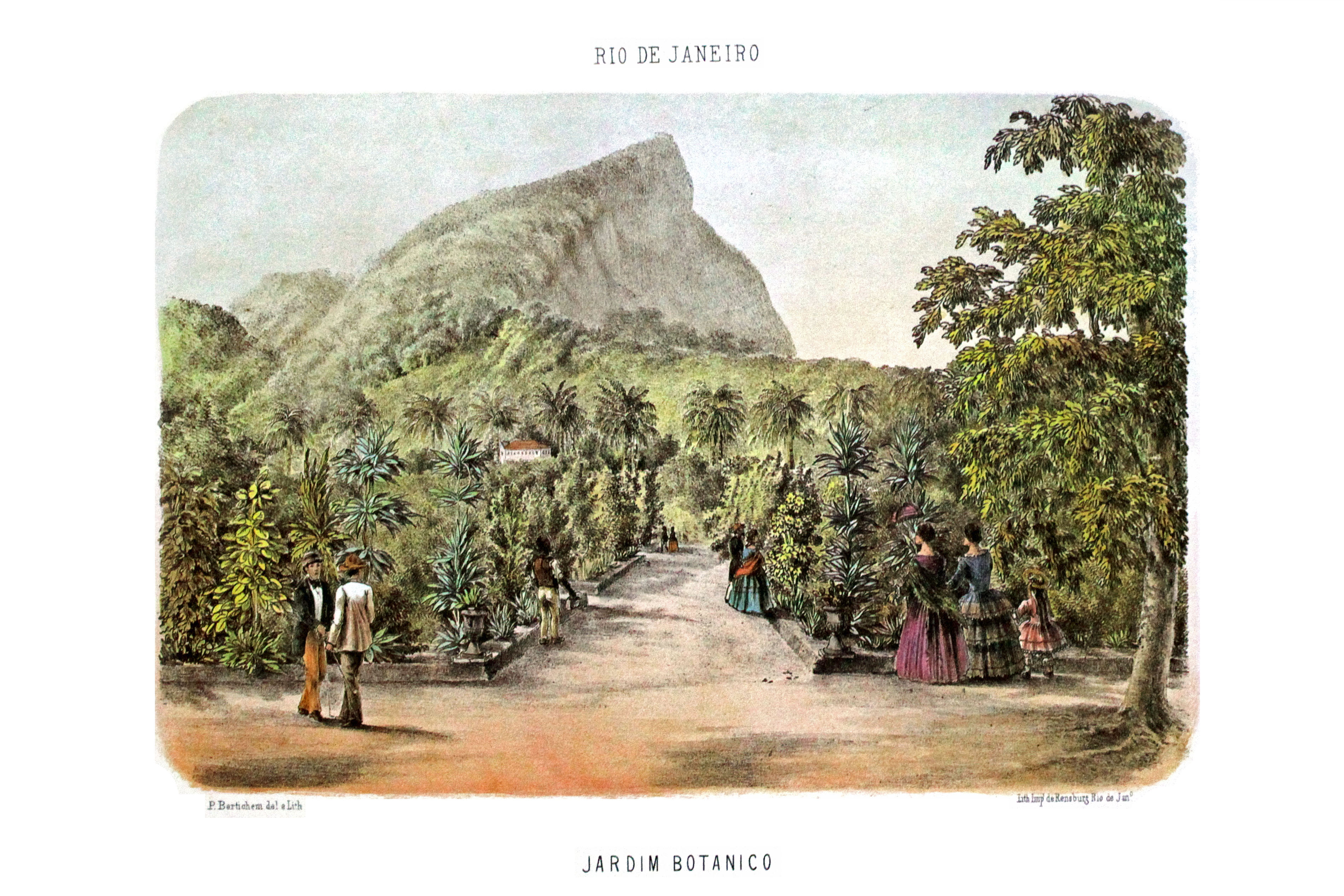
The Imperial Botanical Garden in 1856

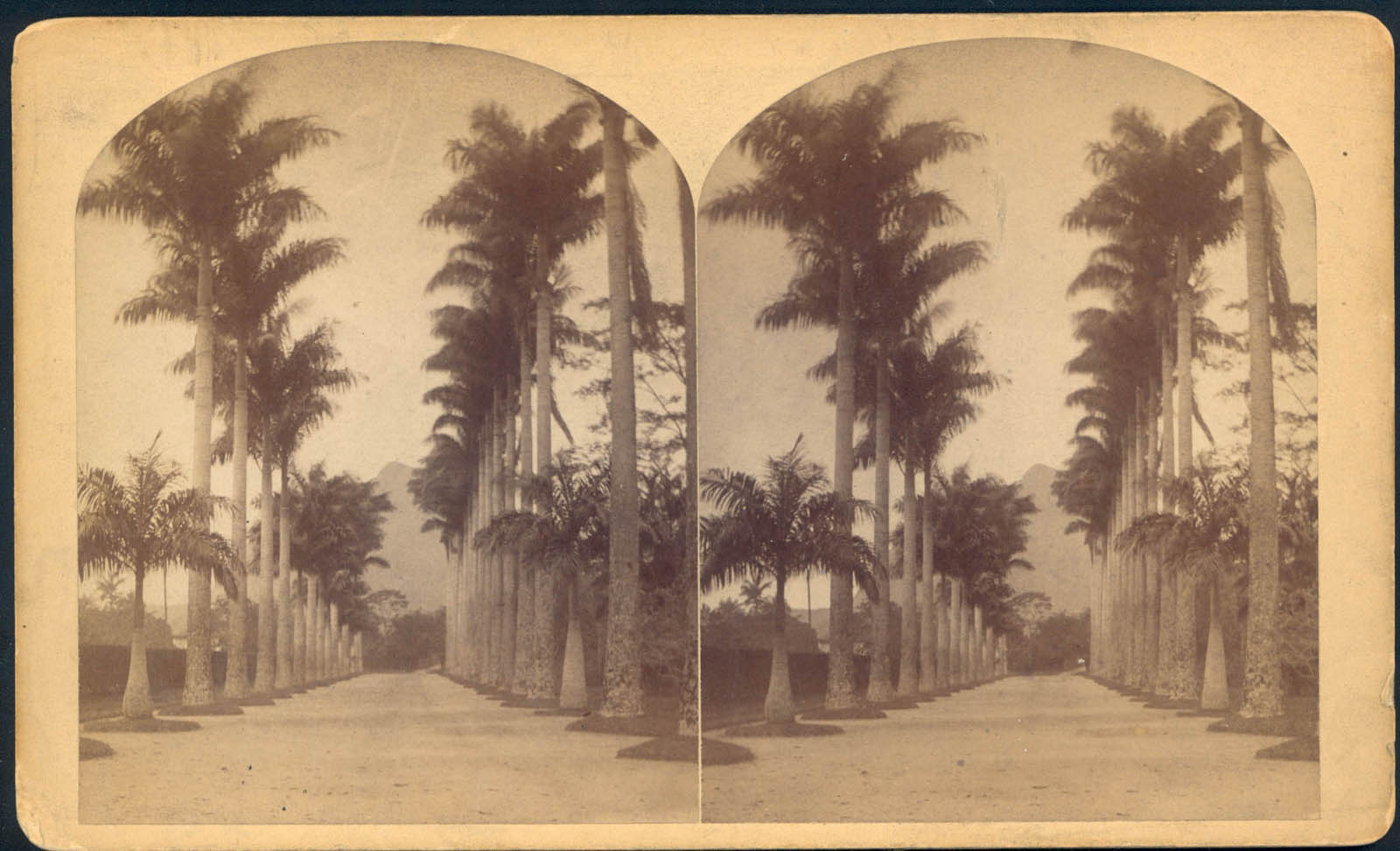
William Bell's stereograph taken on the 1882 transit of Venus expedition.

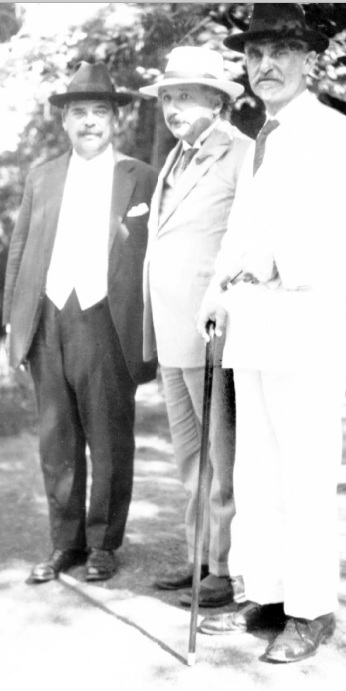
Albert Einstein (center) visiting the Botanical Garden in May 1925.

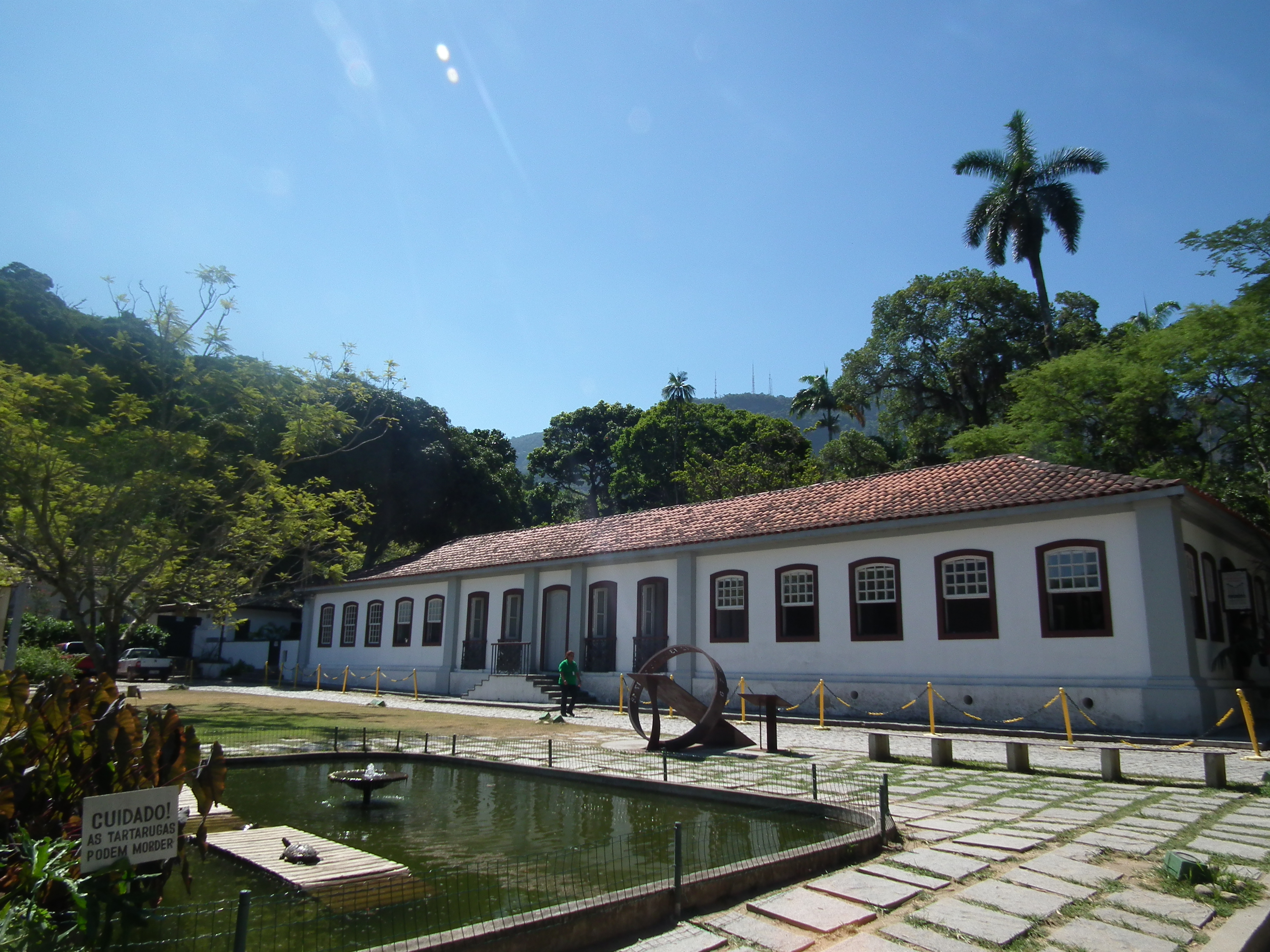
Visitor centre

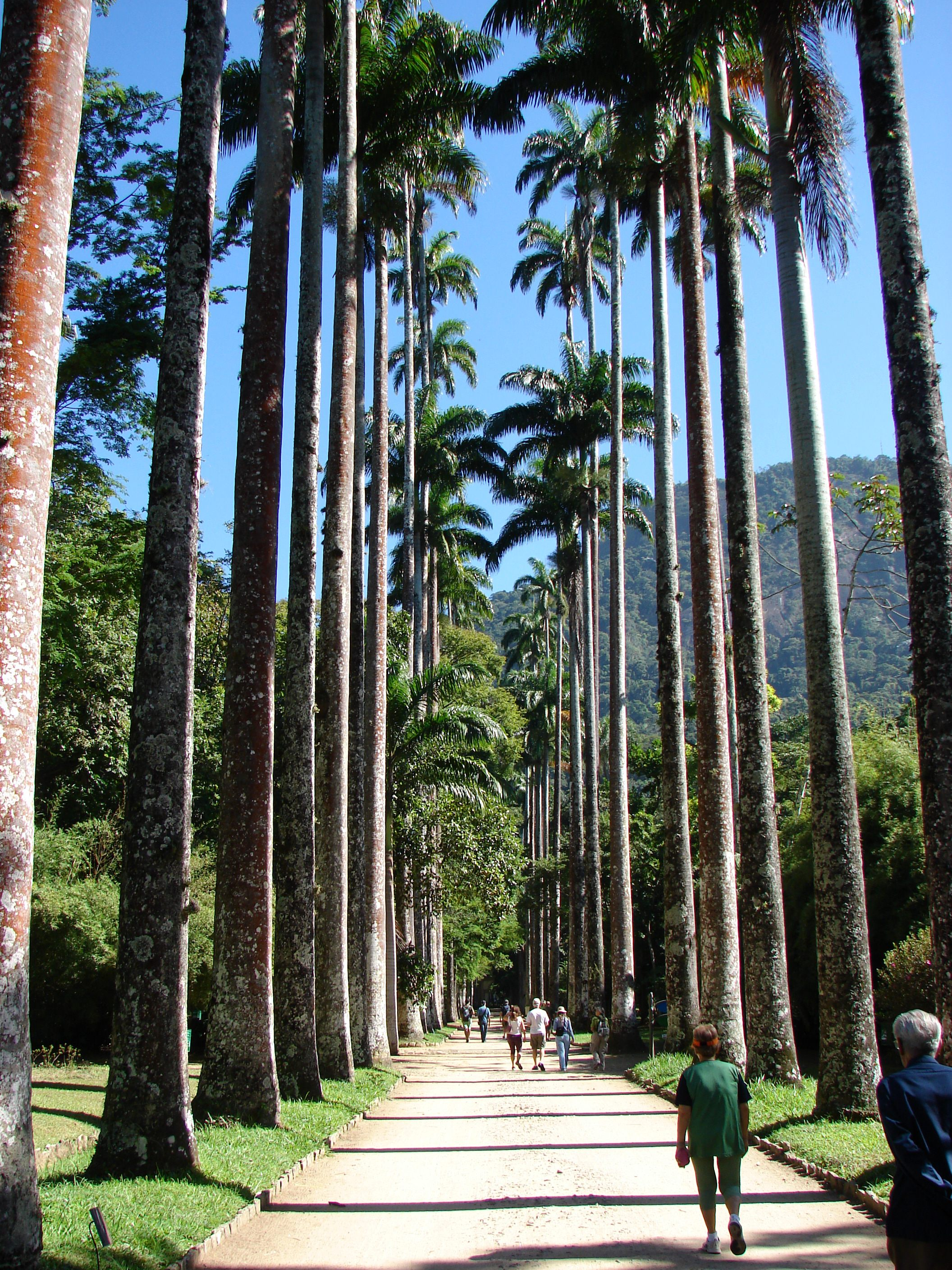
A palm tree avenue (landscape allée) of Roystonea oleracea palms.

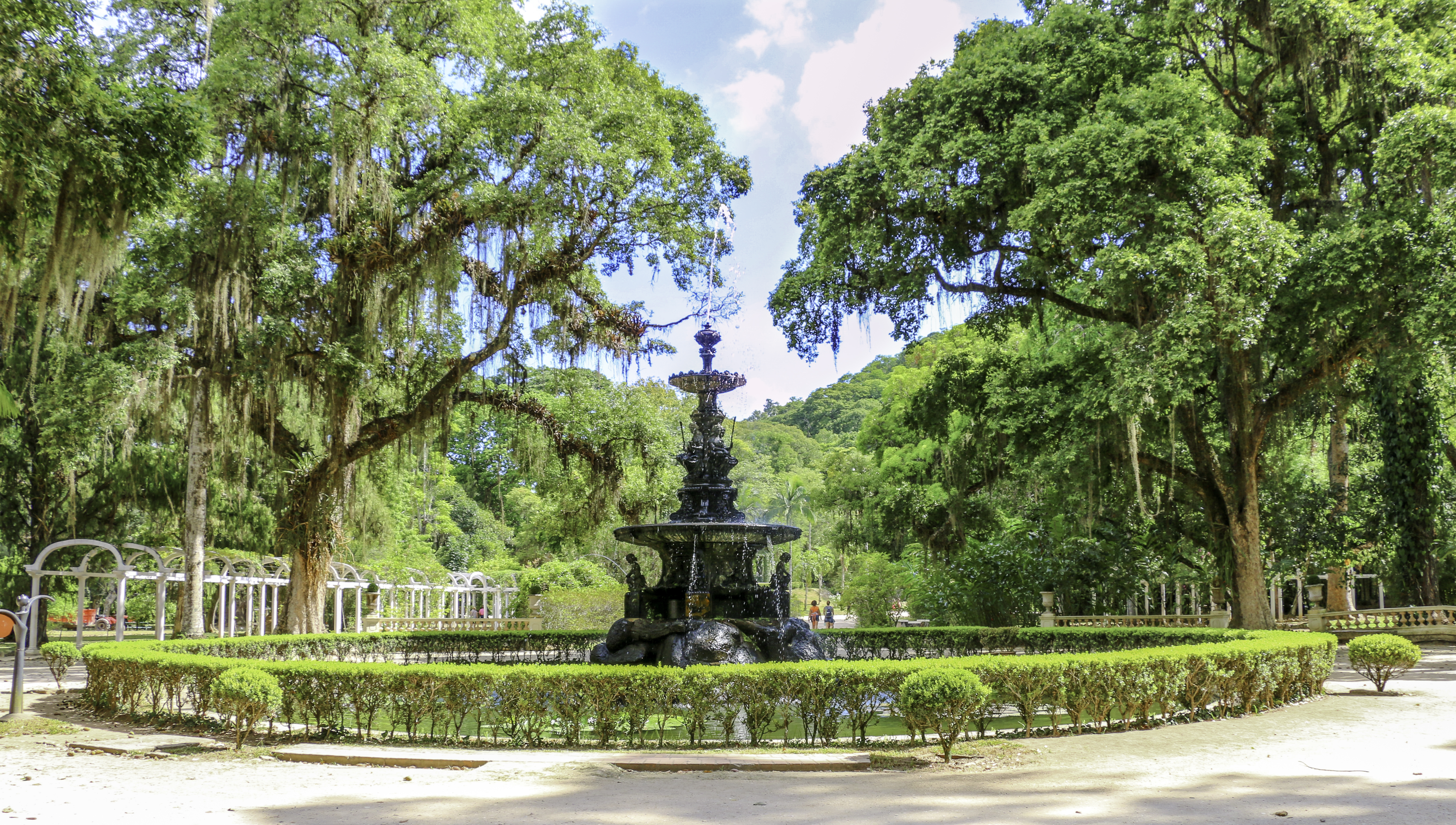
Fountain of the Muses

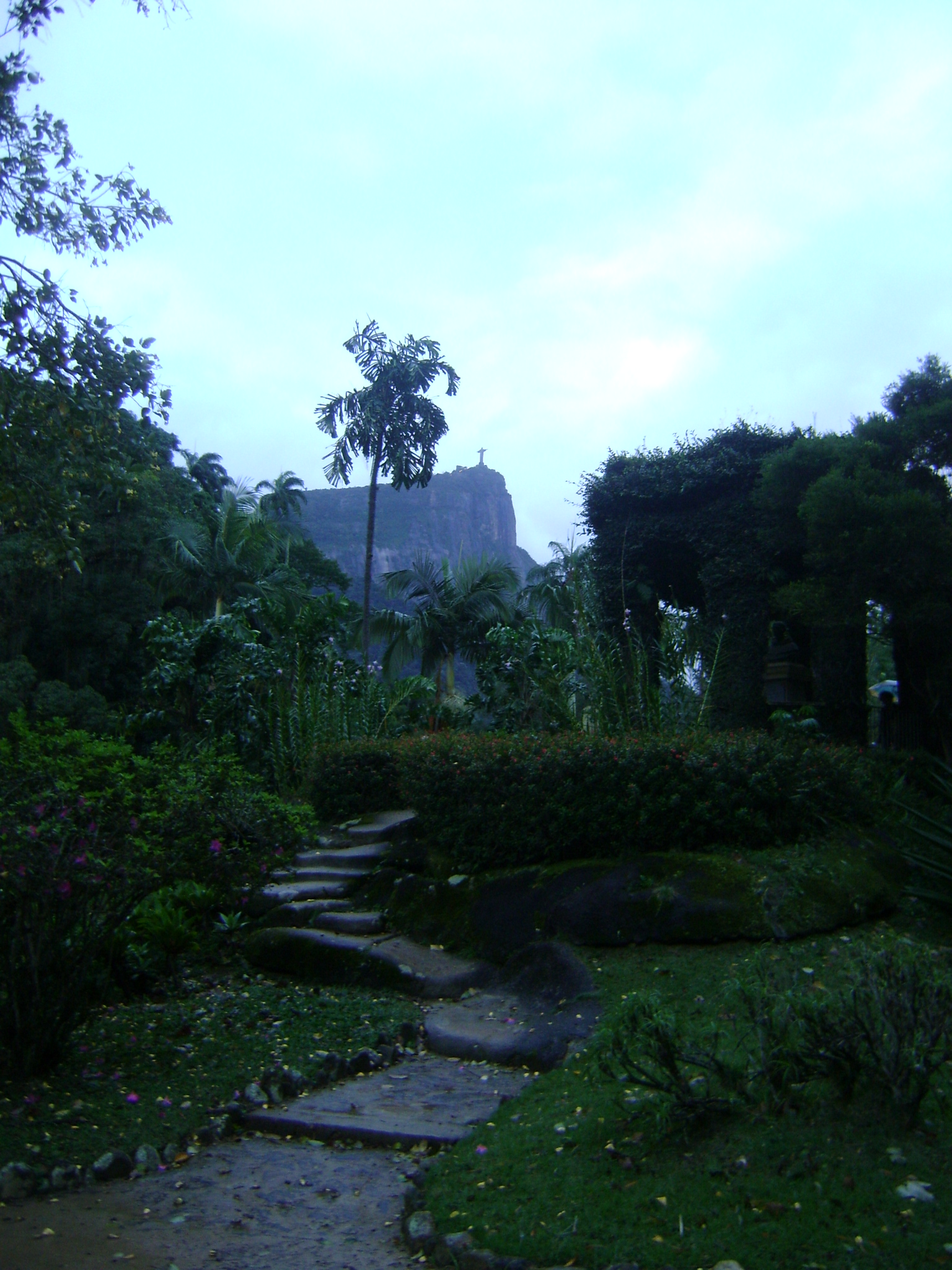
View of the Christ the Redeemer statue from the garden during the winter.

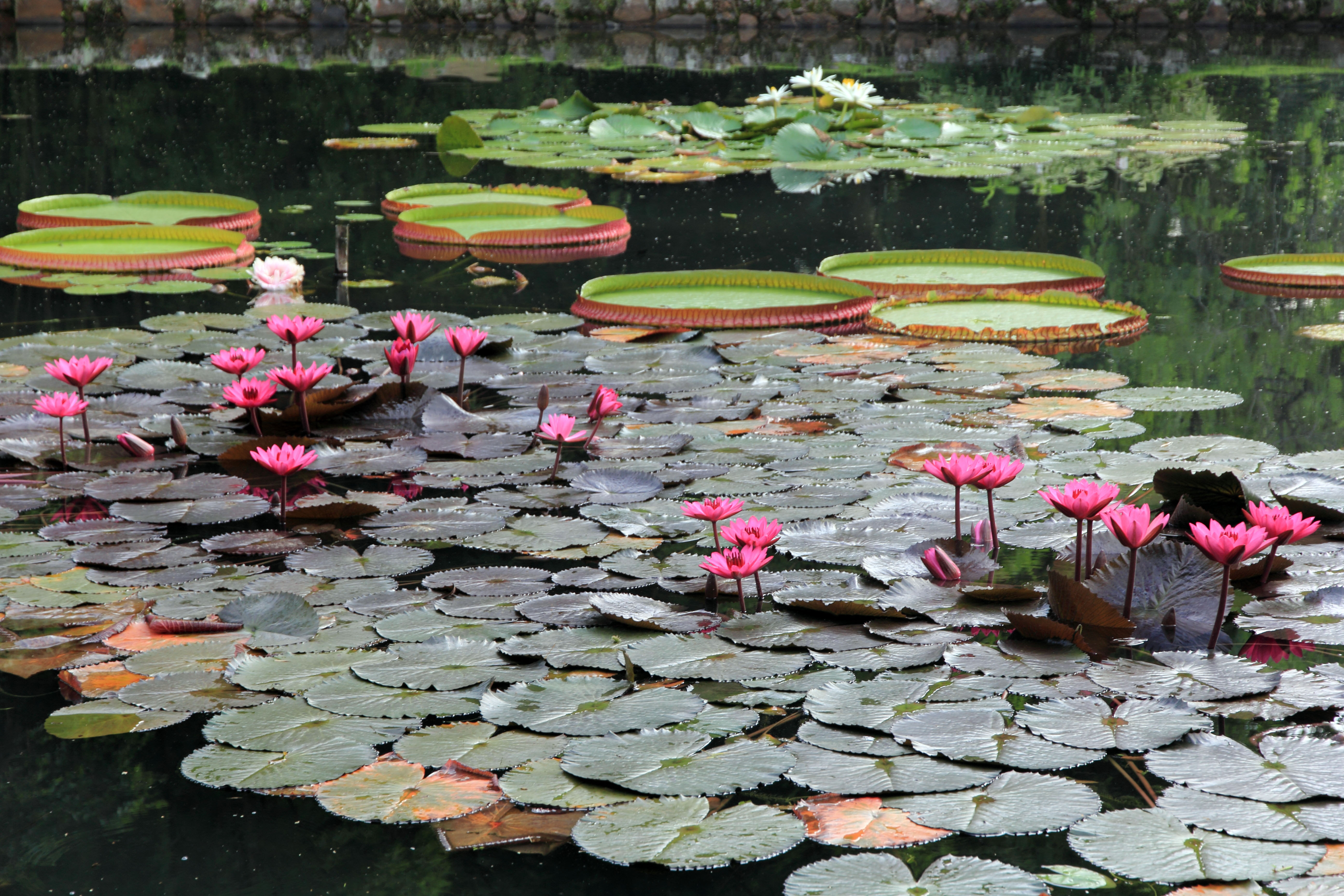
Victoria lilies

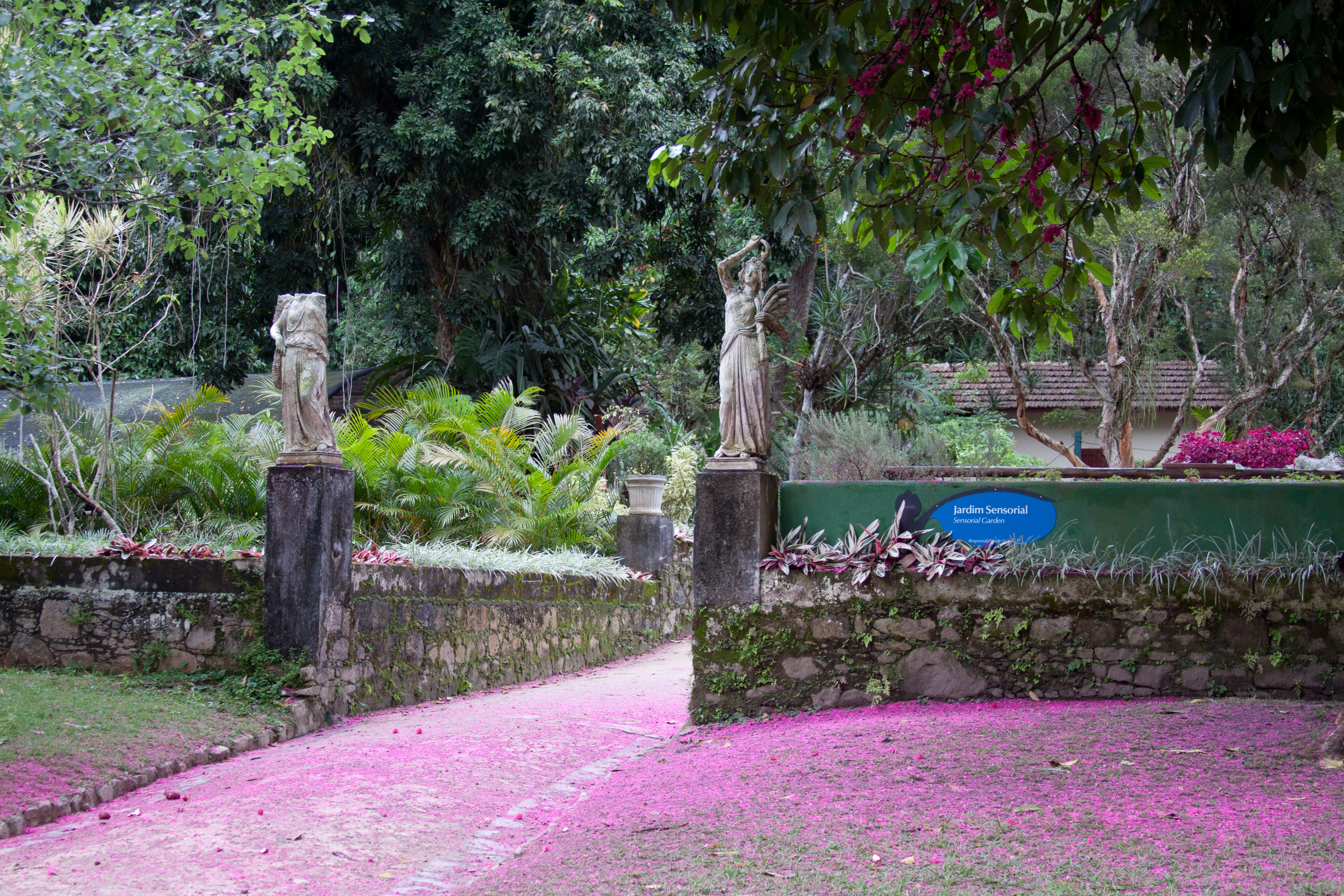
Sensory Garden

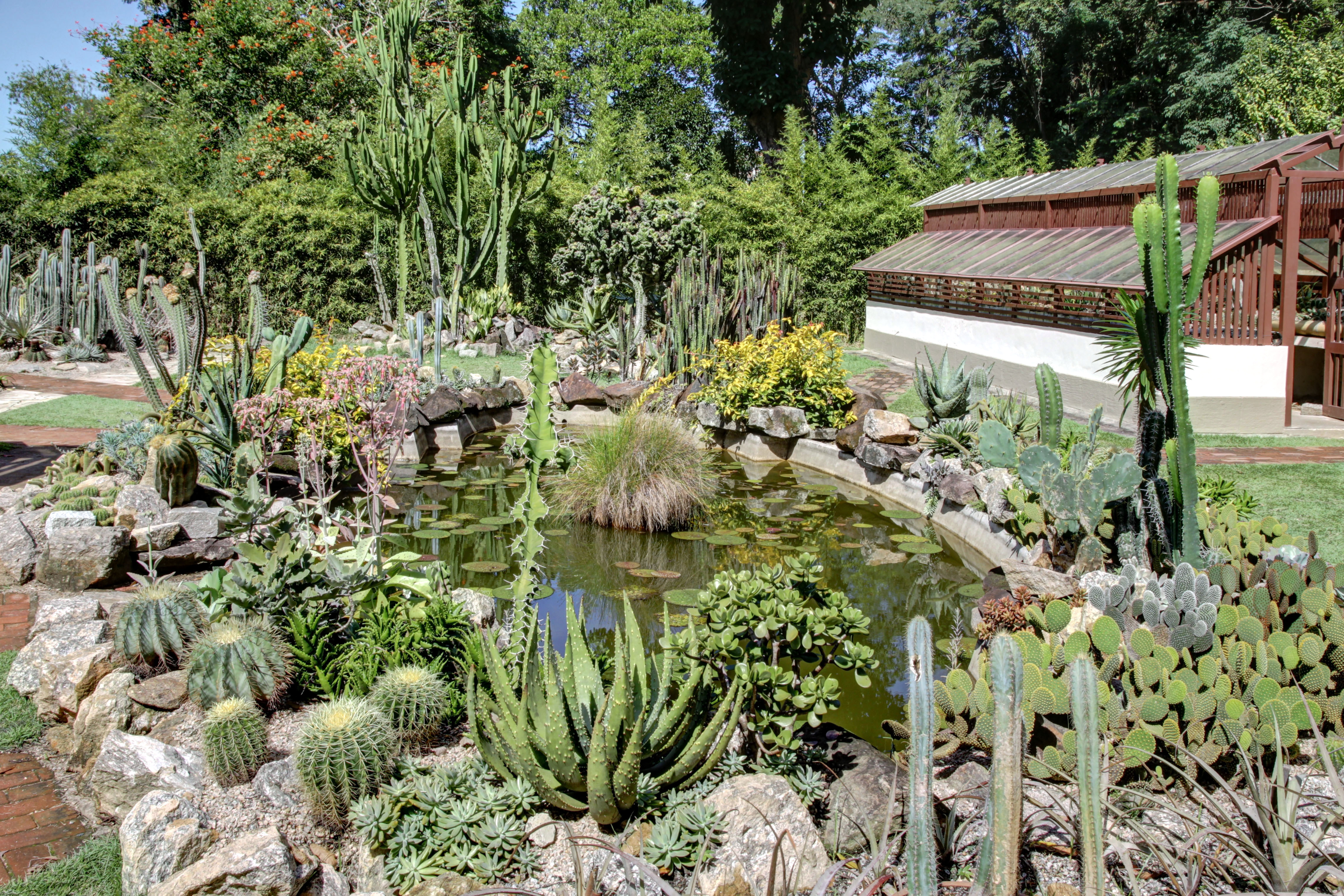
Cactus garden

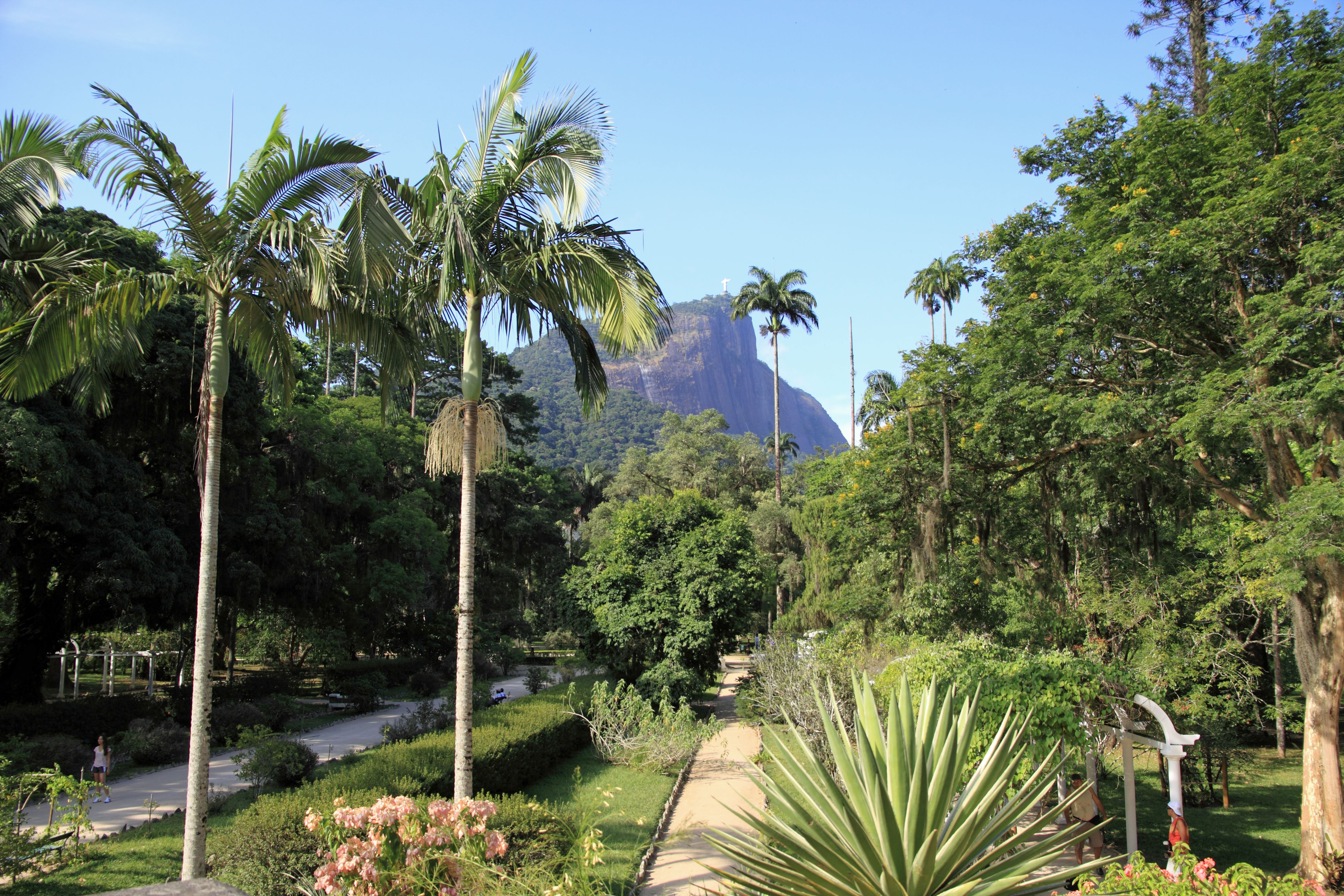
Corcovado Mountain, with Christ the Redeemer at the top, as seen from the Botanical Garden.

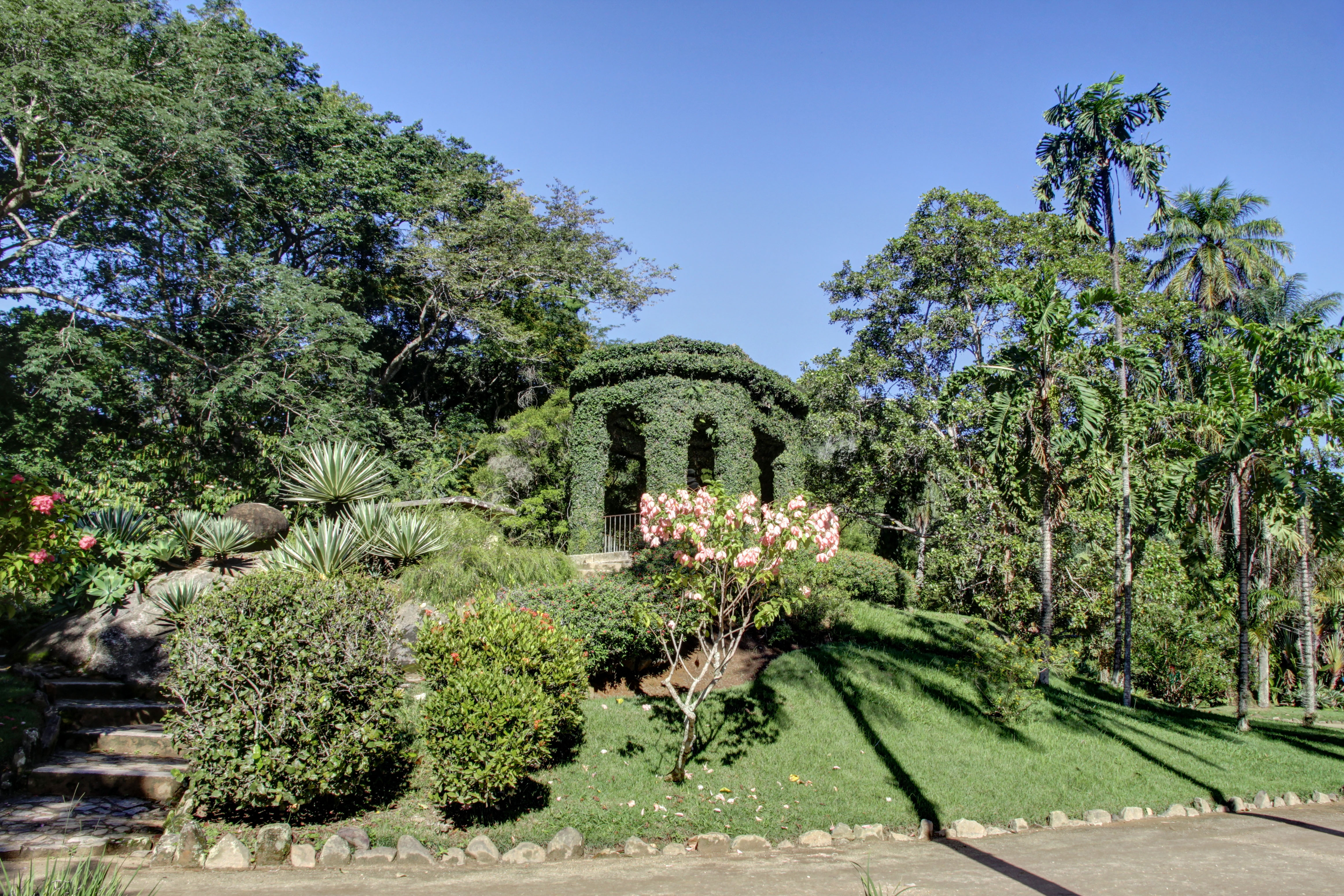
Friar Leandro do Sacramento Memorial

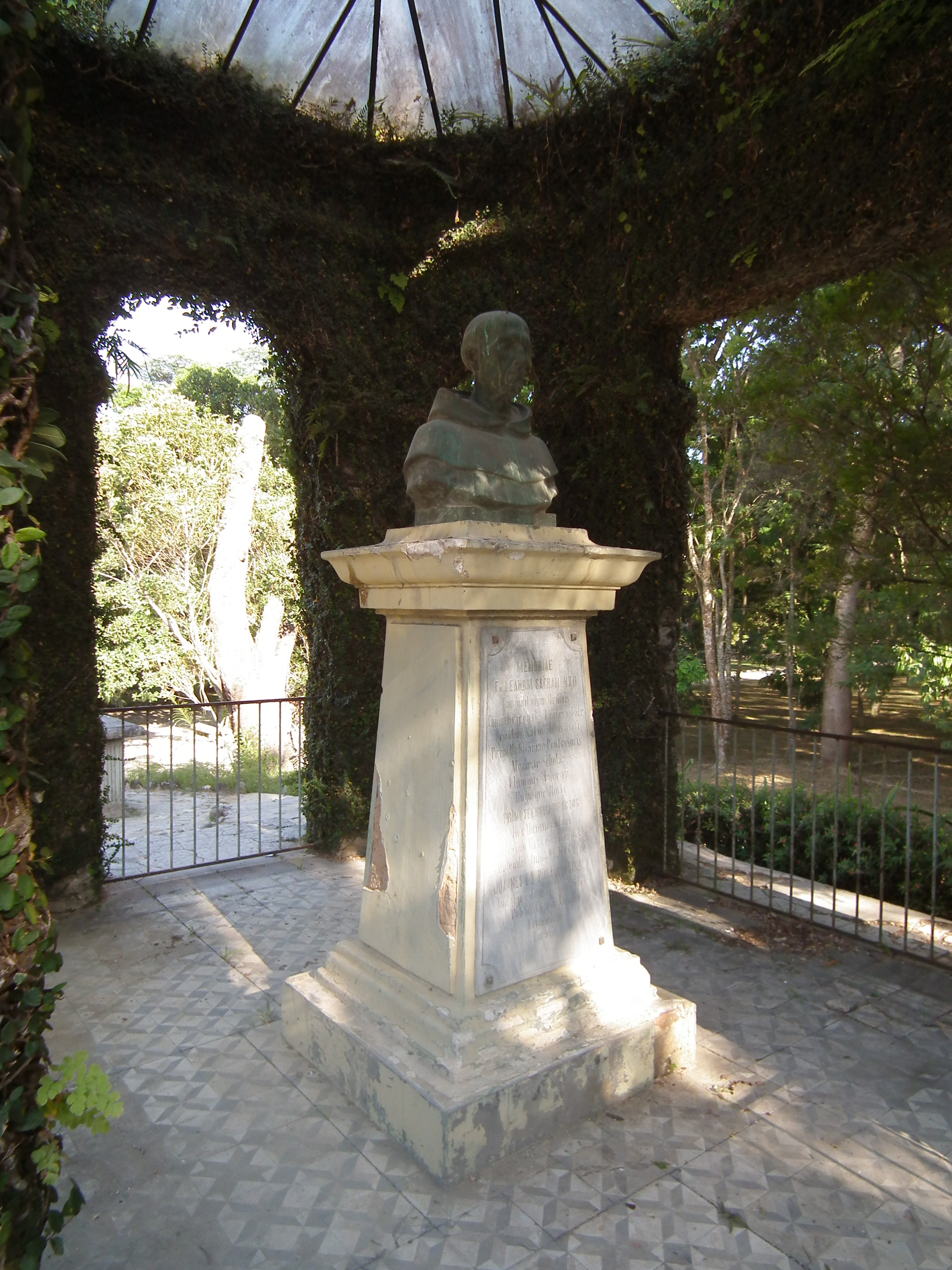
Bust of Friar Leandro do Sacramento at the memorial. Sacramento was the first director of the Botanical Garden.

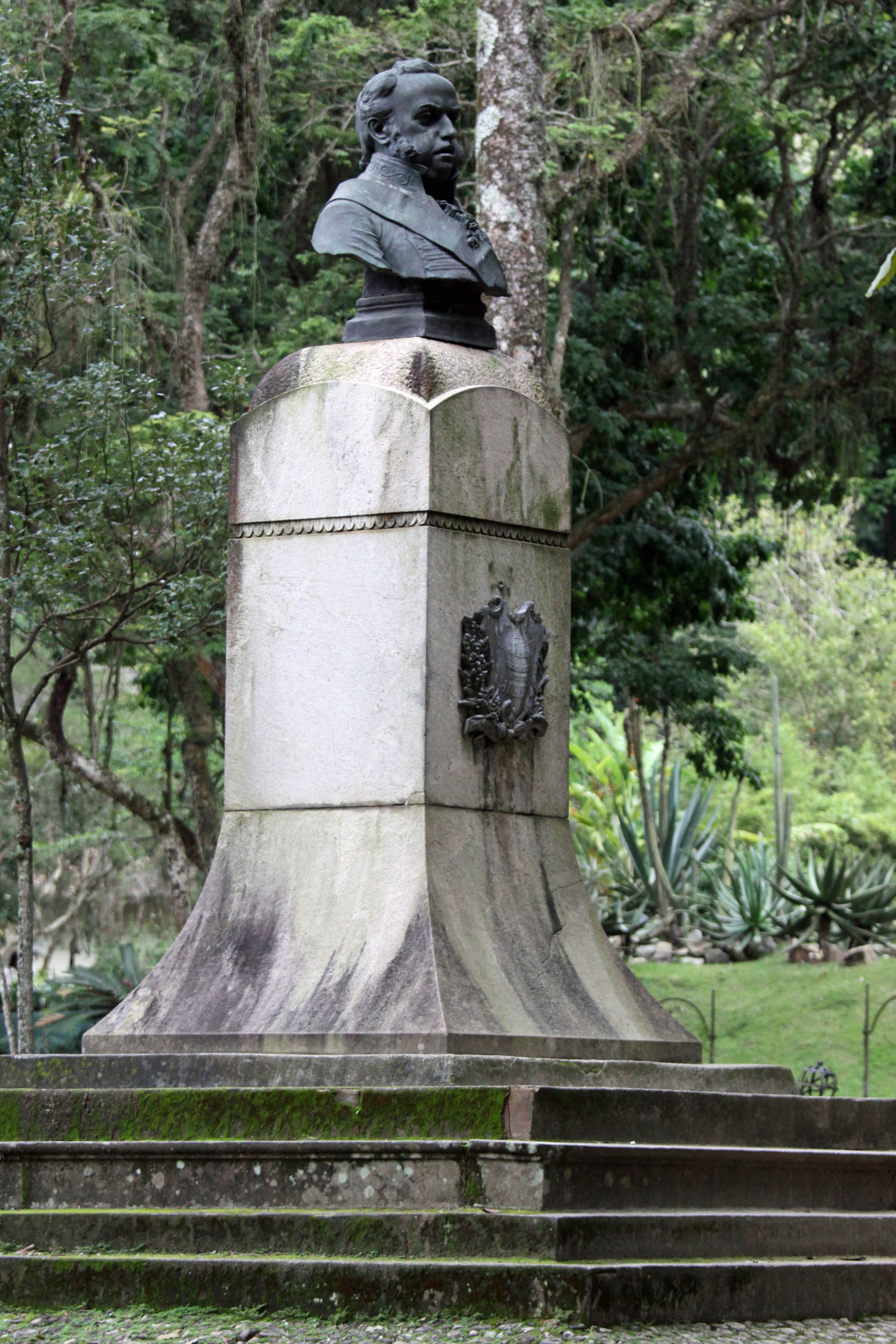
Bust of King John VI, the founder of the Botanical Garden

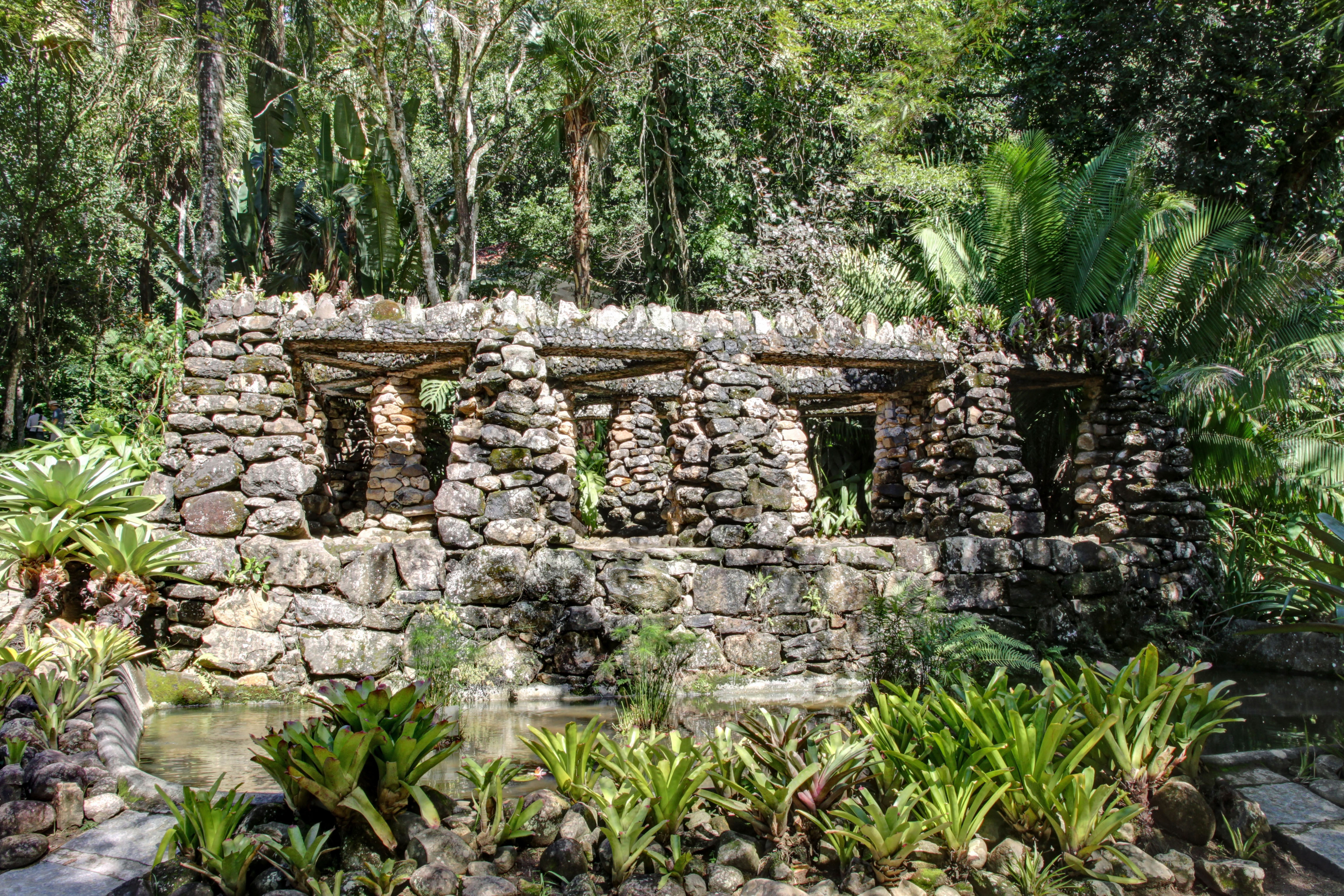
Karl Glasl cave

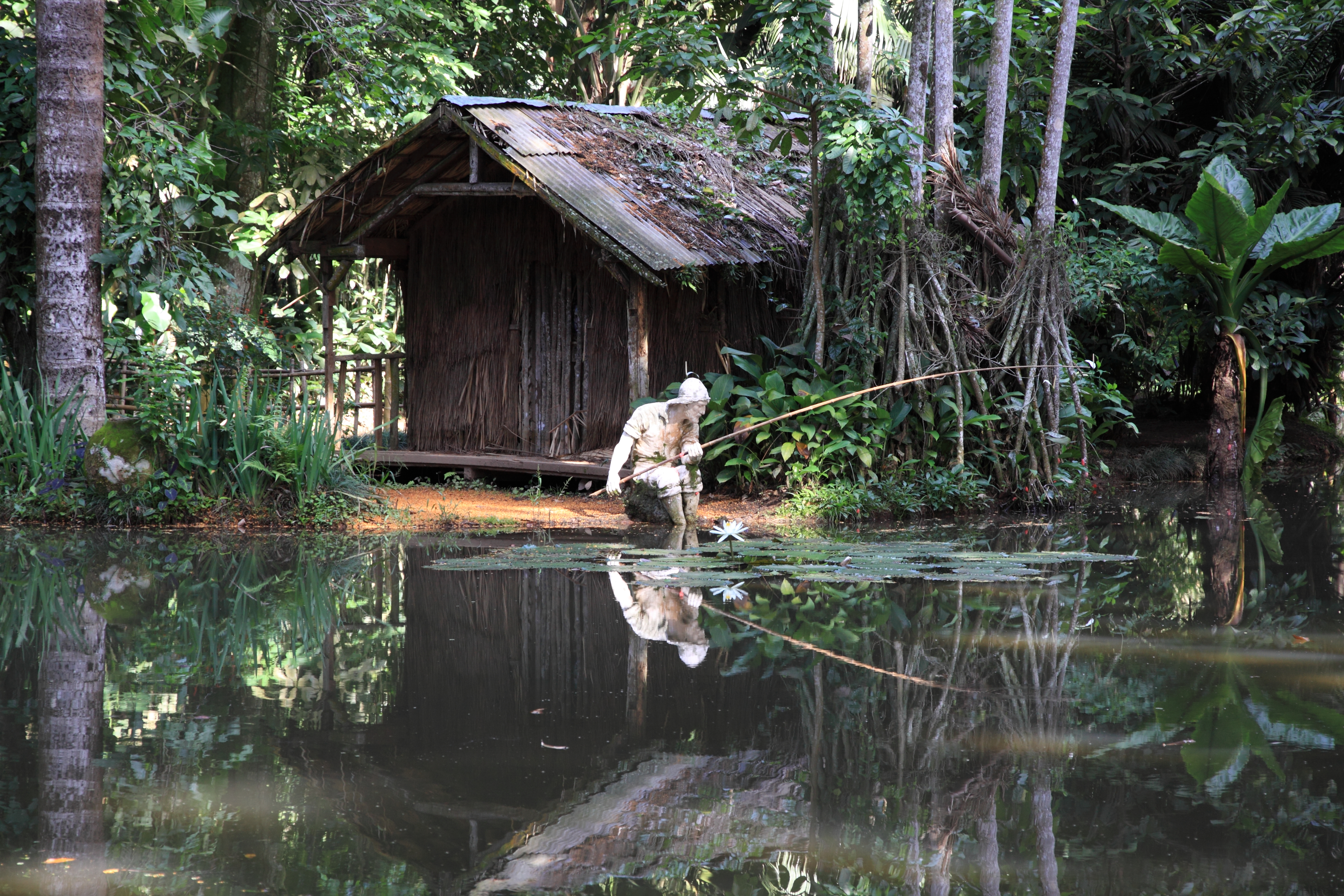
Amazon Region - Fisherman's Lake

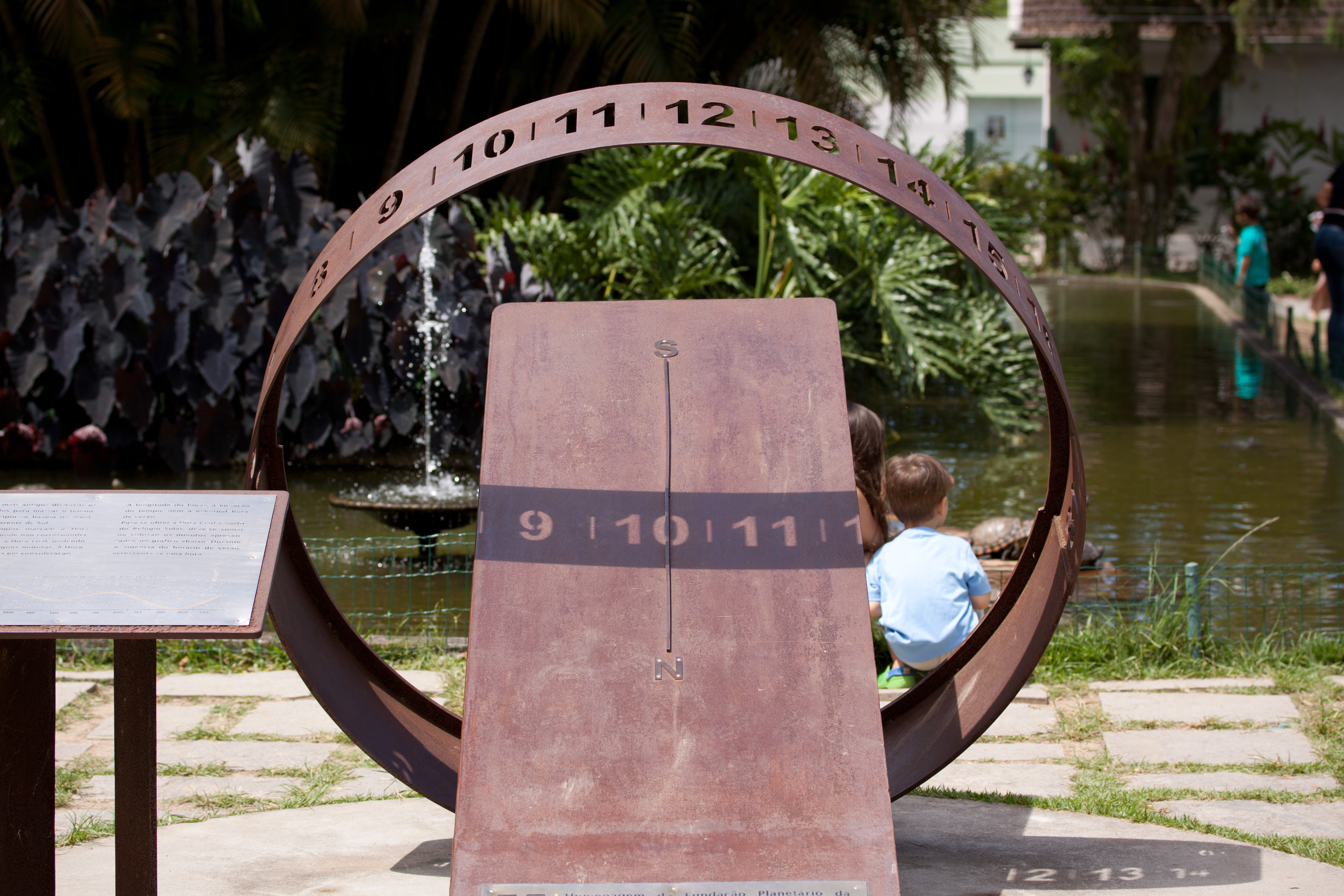
Equatorial Sundial

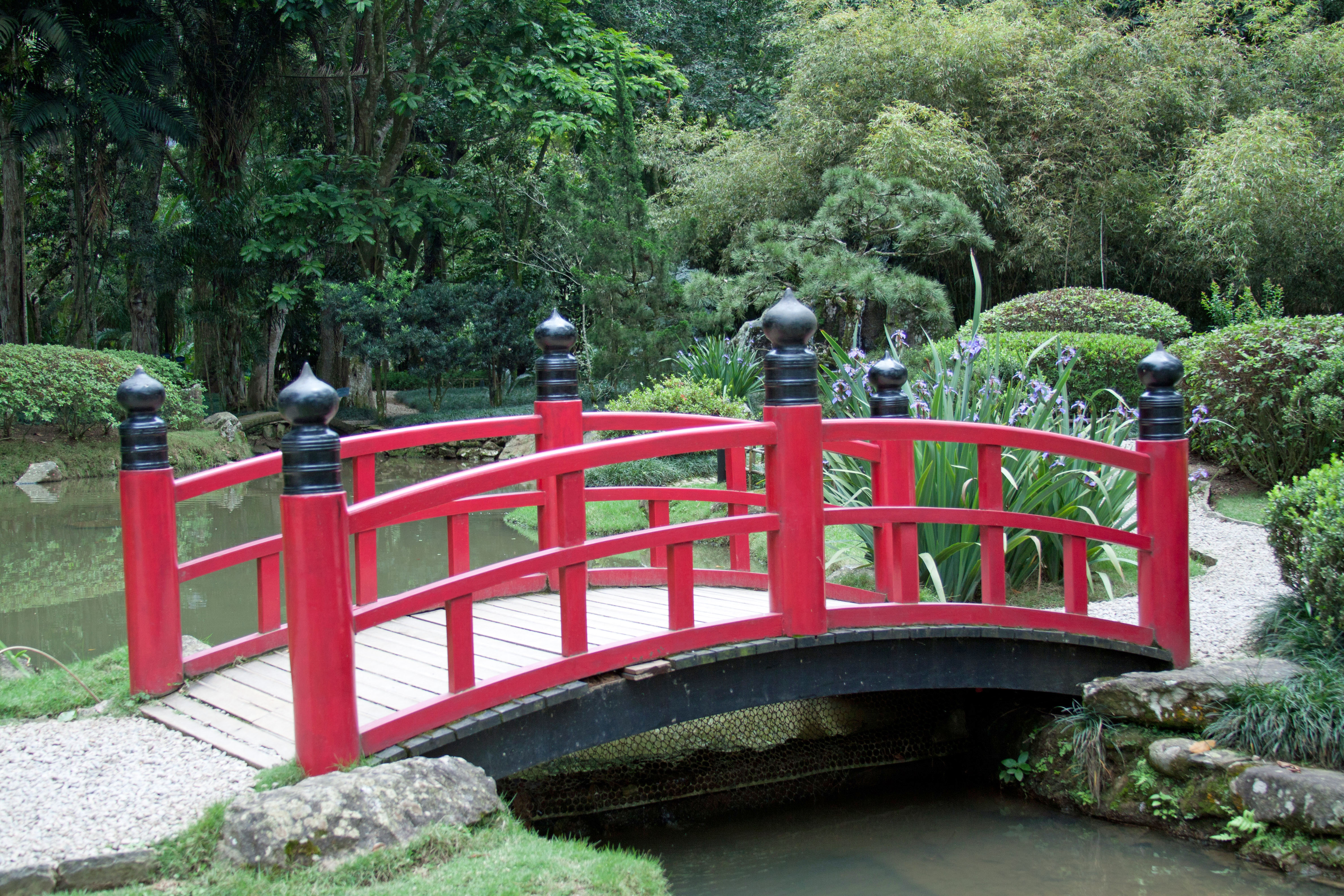
Japanese garden

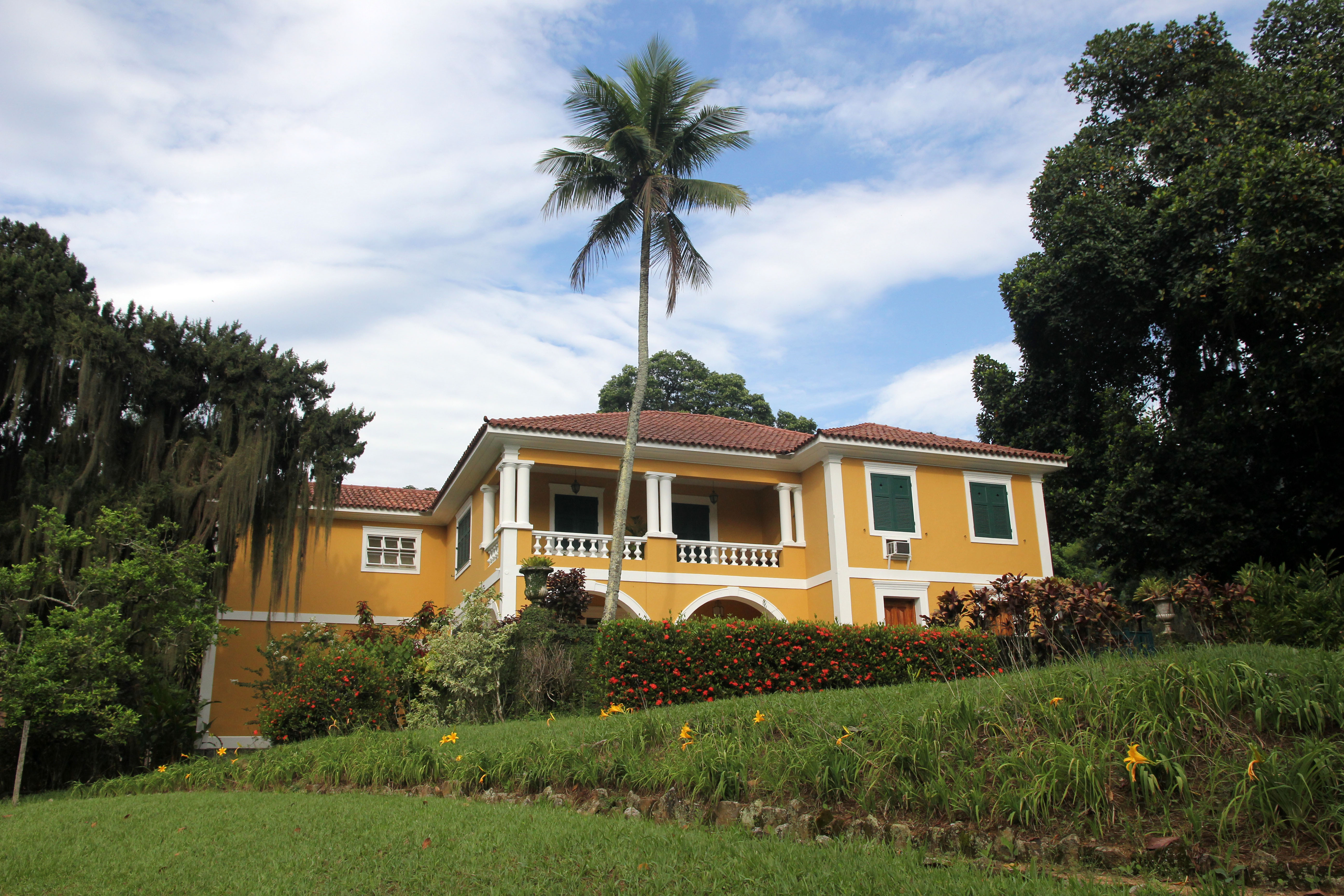
Administrative building

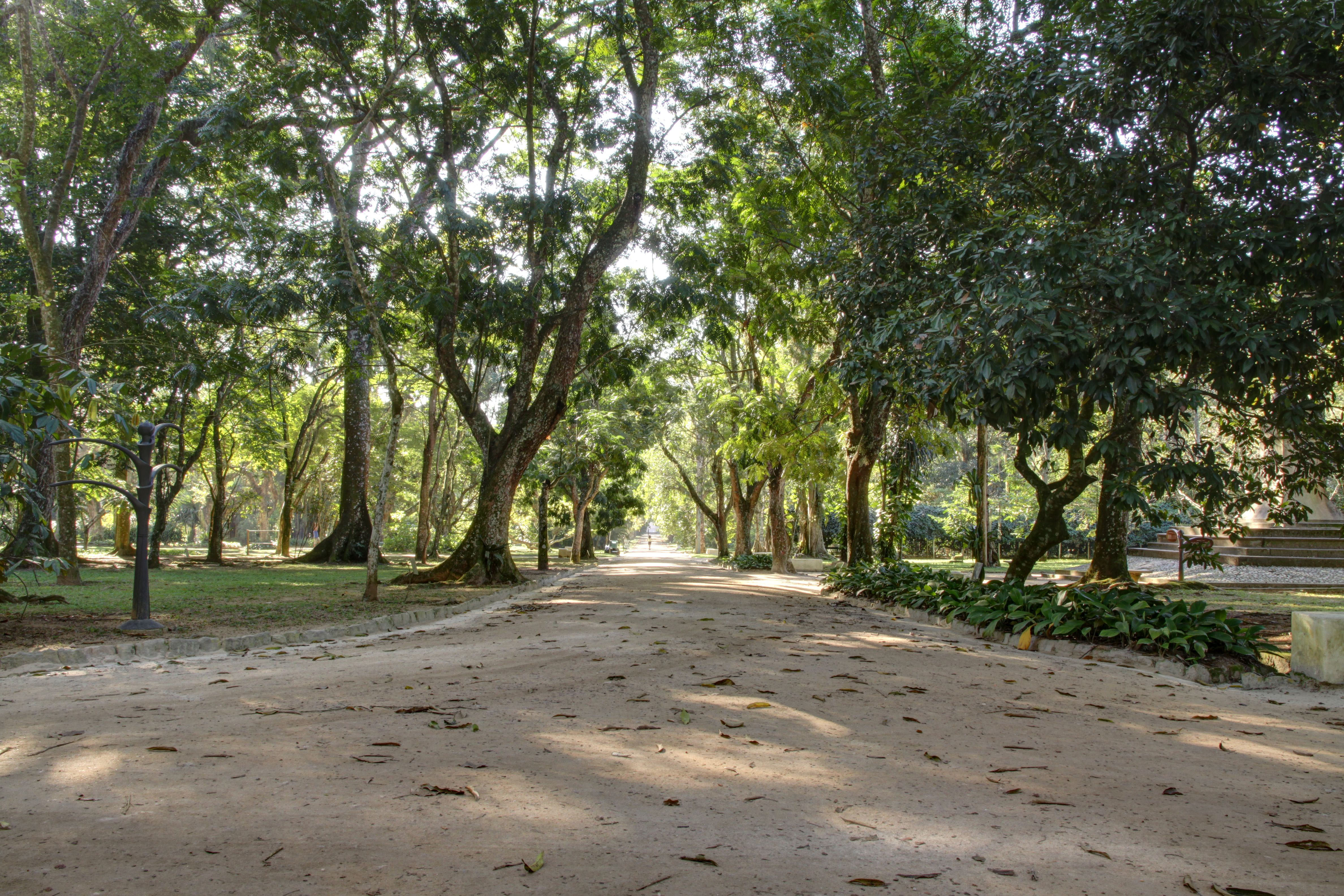
Paths

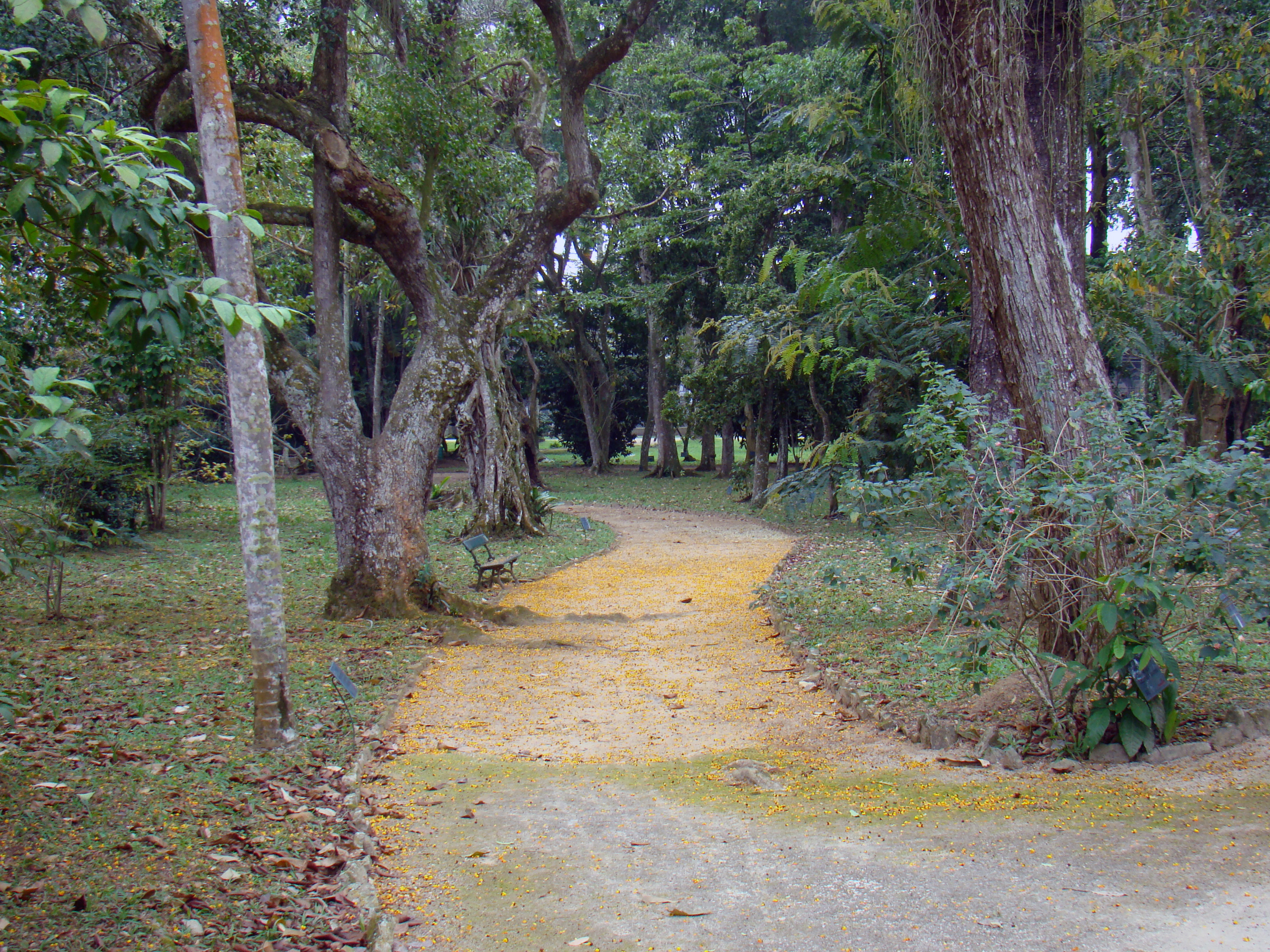
Garden path and park bench.

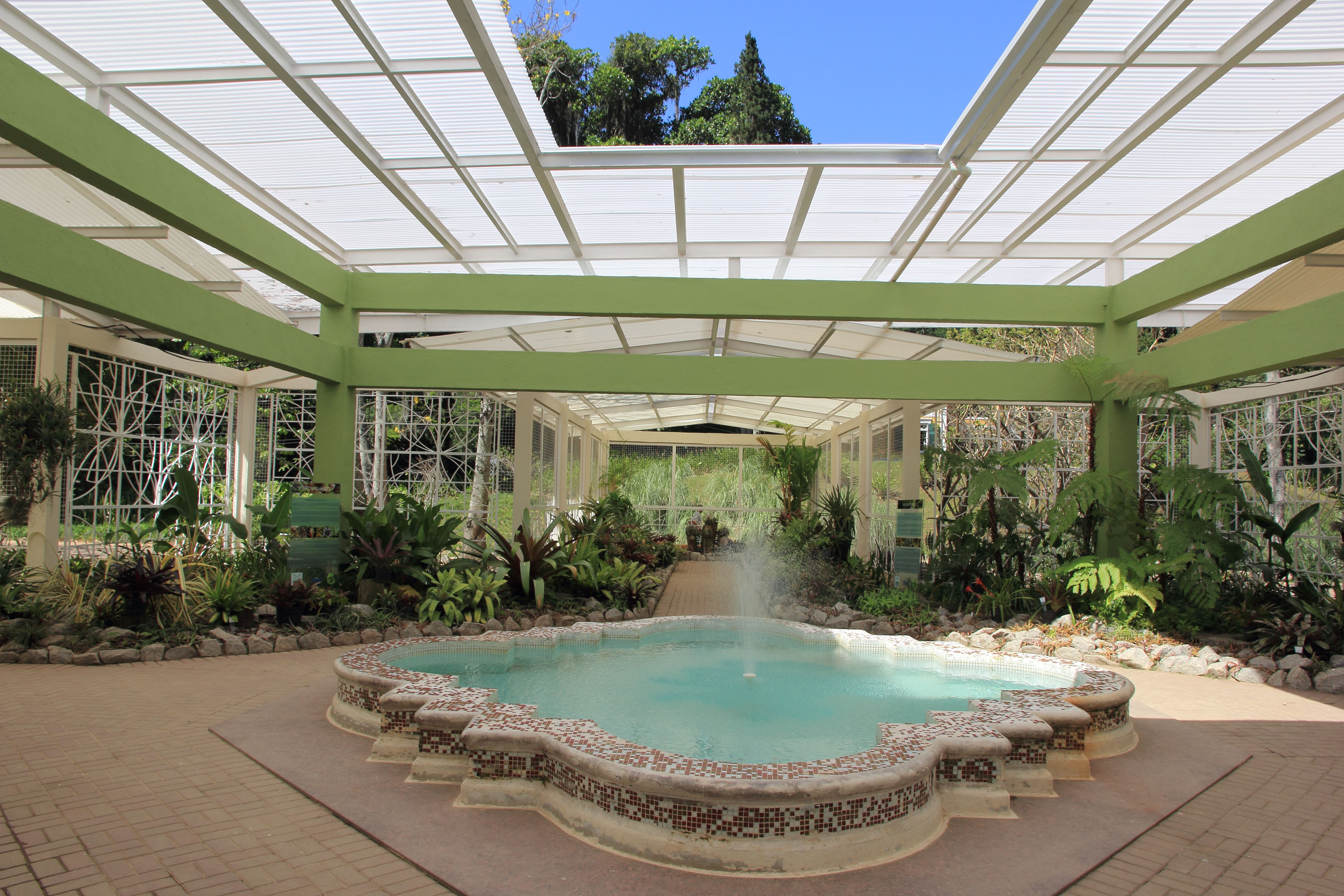
Bromeliads

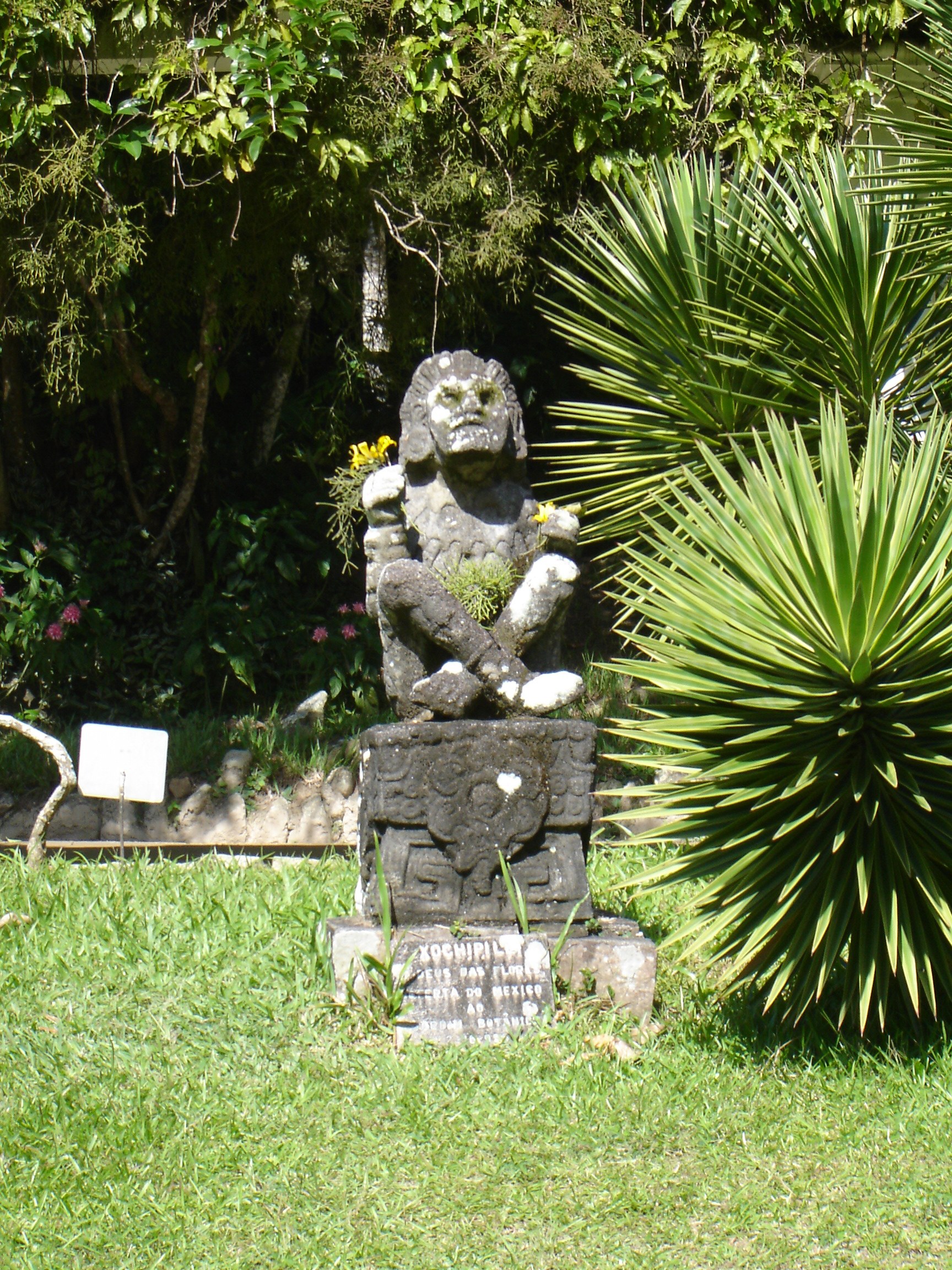
Replica of a statue of Xochipilli, the Aztec god of flowers

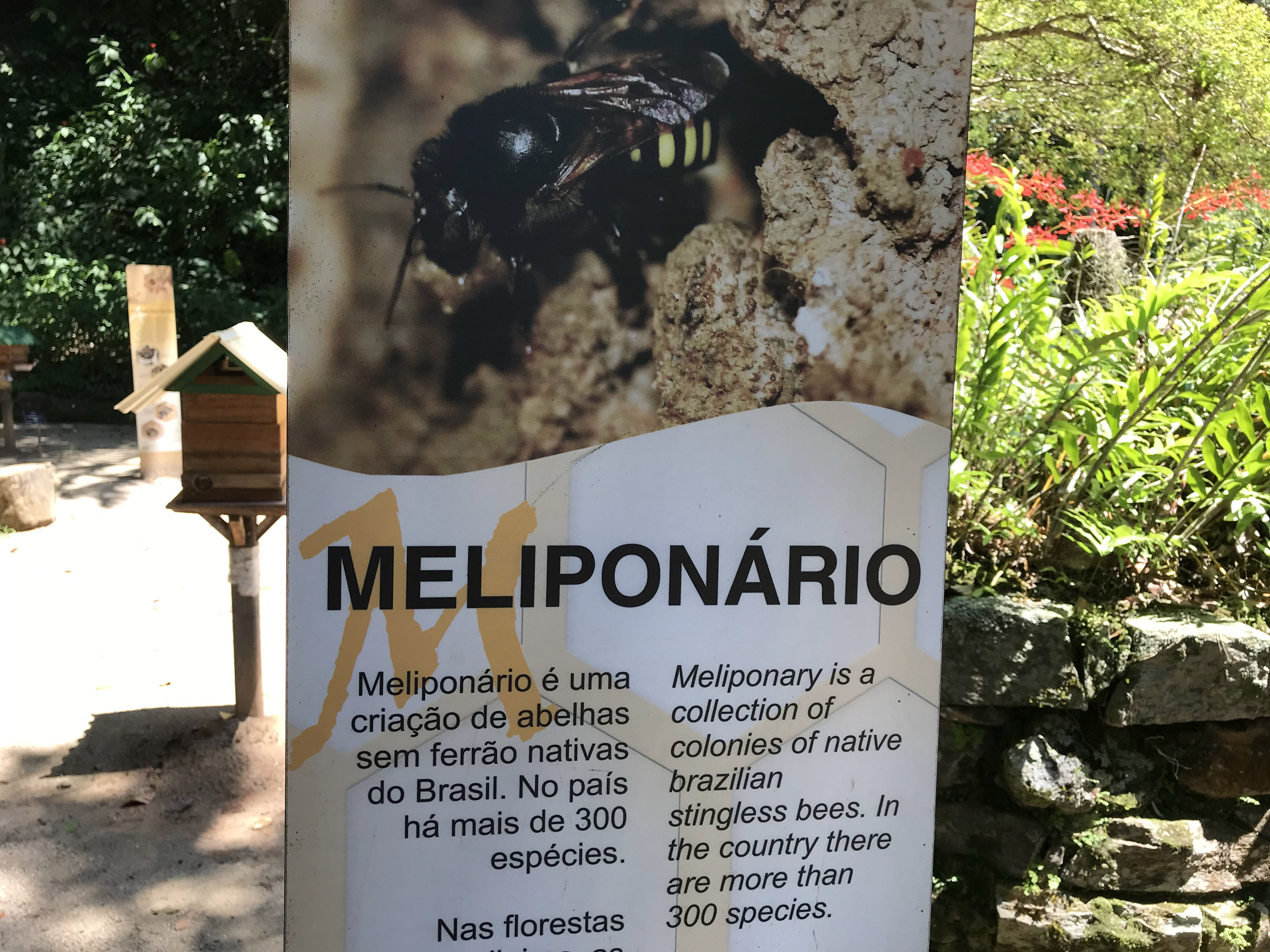
Meliponário

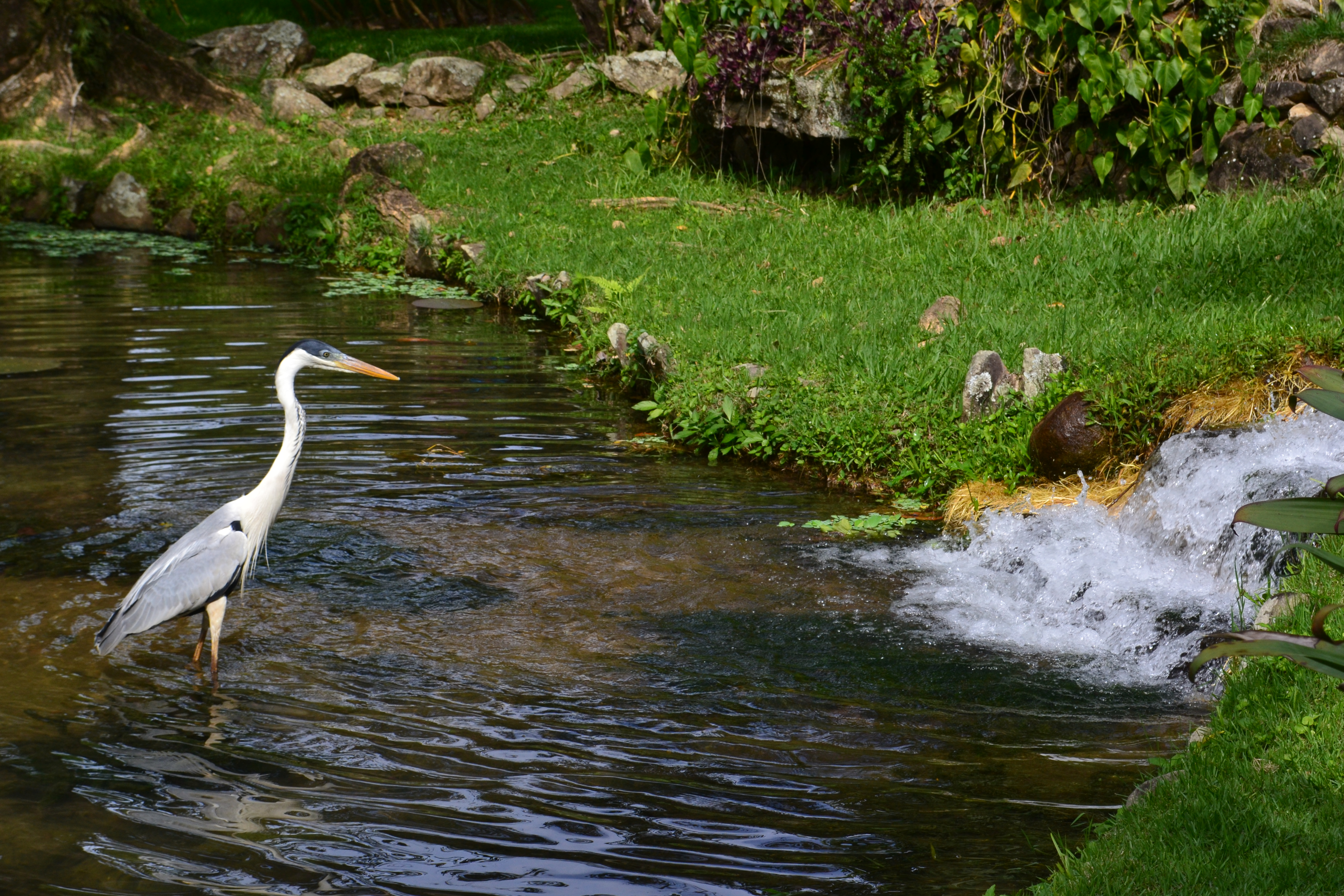
Cocoi heron hunting at Frei Leandro Lake
