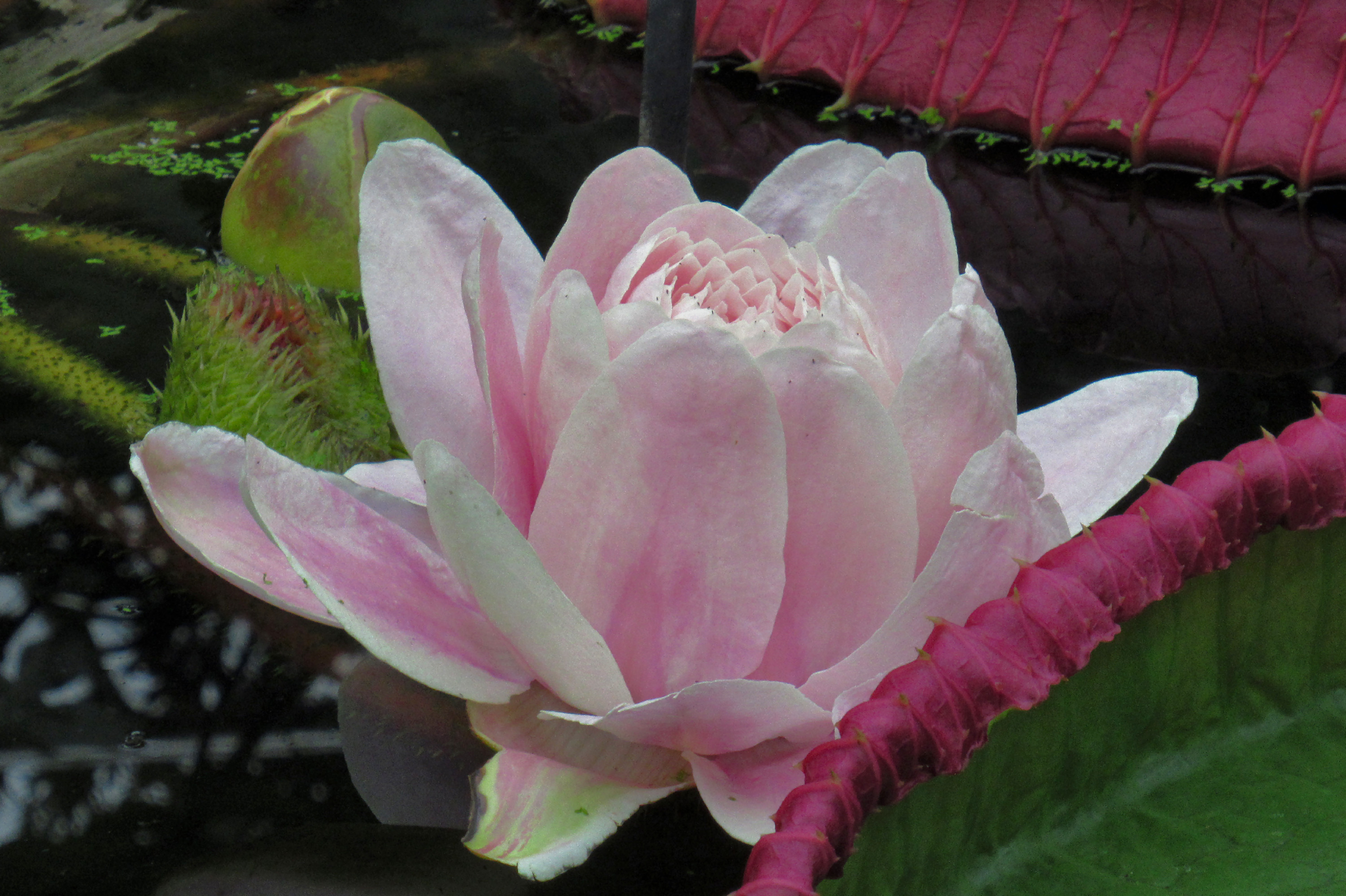
- Victoria boliviana flower

Conservation status
- Least Concern (IUCN 3.1)

Scientific classification
- Kingdom: Plantae
- Clade: Tracheophytes
- Clade: Angiosperms
- Order: Nymphaeales
- Family: Nymphaeaceae
- Genus: Victoria
- Species: V. boliviana

Binomial name
- Victoria boliviana Magdalena & L.T.Sm.
- Victoria boliviana is endemic to Bolivia

= Victoria boliviana =

Species of plant

Victoria boliviana, or the Bolivian waterlily is a species of aquatic plant within the genus Victoria in the family Nymphaeaceae. It is the newest described species of the genus and its largest member in size and was officially identified in 2022. In January 2023, the species was awarded three Guinness World Record titles for world's largest waterlily species, world's largest waterlily leaf and world's largest undivided leaf, with the latter two specifically recognising a specimen grown in 2012 at La Rinconada Gardens in Santa Cruz, Bolivia.

== Description ==
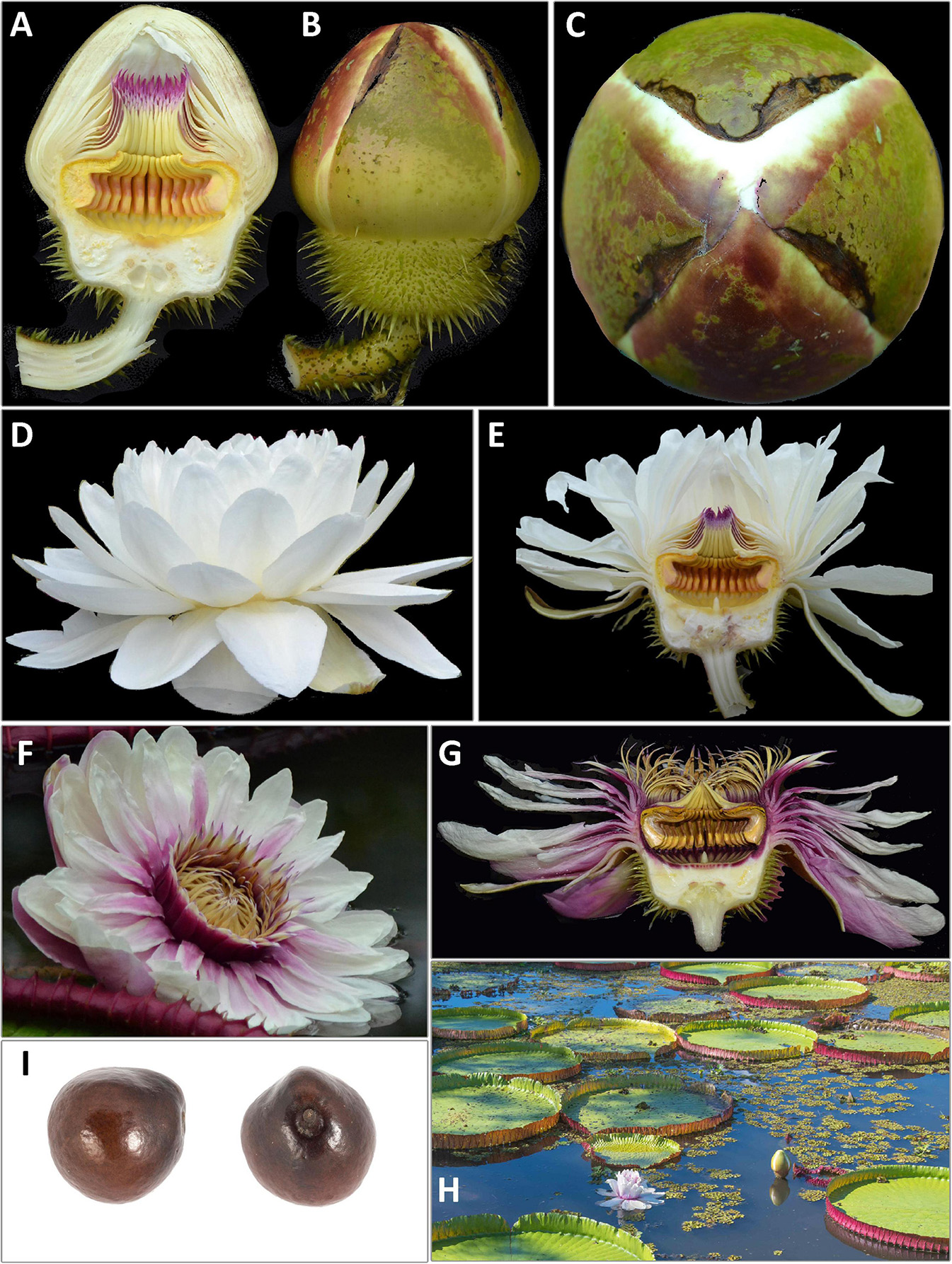
Overview of Victoria boliviana

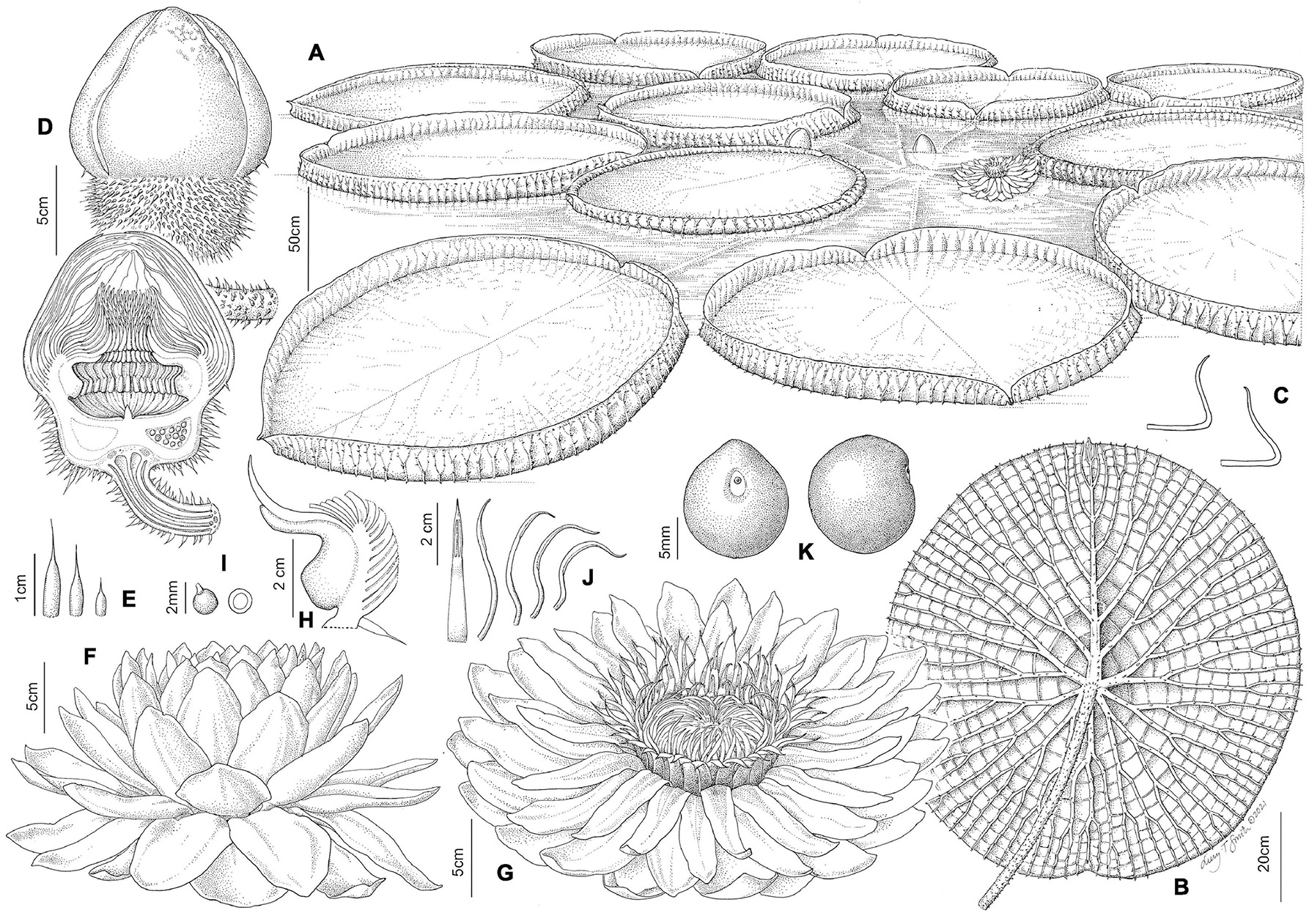
Illustration of Victoria boliviana

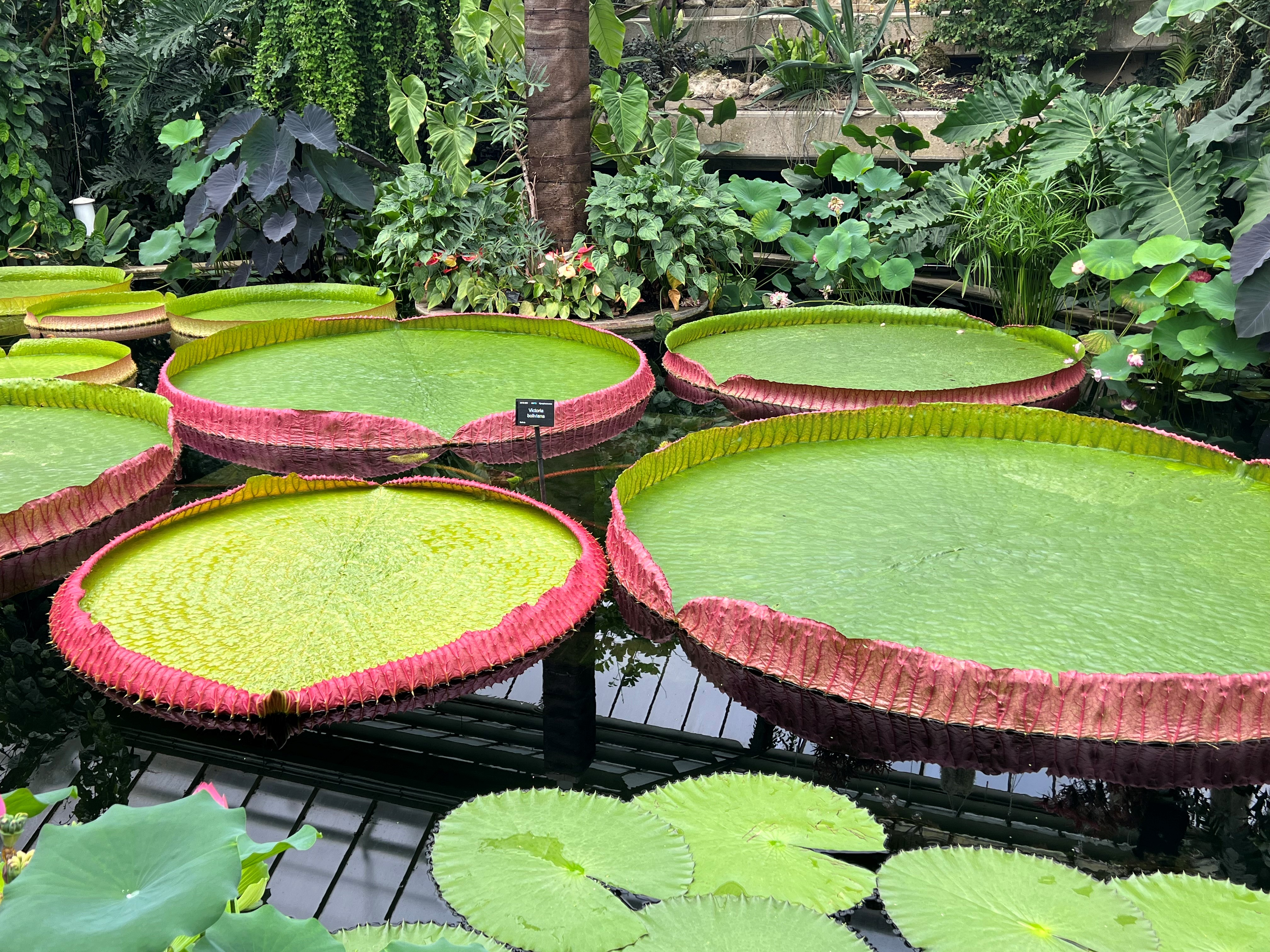
Victoria boliviana cultivated Kew Gardens

=== Vegetative characteristics ===
It is a large, rhizomatous, aquatic plant with large, petiolate, orbicular, up to 3.2 m wide floating leaves. The 7 cm tall rim of the lamina has sharp prickles. The upper leaf surface is green and the lower surface is green, blue, or maroon. The petiole is prickly.

=== Generative characteristics ===
The nocturnal, solitary, protogynous, white to pink, prickly, up to 36 cm wide flowers float on the water surface. The four 10–15 cm long, and 8–10 cm wide sepals bear prickles. The gynoecium consists of 25–36 radially arranged carpels with carpellary appendages. The fruit bears 300 black to brown, arillate, globose, 12–13 mm long, and 16–17 mm wide seeds with a distinctive, prominent raphe (i.e., a ridge at the top of the seed).

== Cytology ==
The chromosome count is 2n = 2x = 24.

== Taxonomy ==
It was published by Carlos Magdalena and Lucy T. Smith in 2022. The type specimen was collected by S. G. Beck in a lagoon by the Yacuma River, Ballivían Province, Bolivia on the 29th of March 1988.

=== Delimitation from Victoria cruziana and Victoria amazonica ===
Victoria boliviana differs in many different features from the remaining two species of the genus. This includes its larger seed and ovule size (each seed being about 70% longer and wider, and over four times as voluminous as those of V. amazonica and V. cruziana), as well as its moderate or intermediate rim height of the leaf lamina. Also, unlike V. amazonica and V. cruziana, it lacks trichomes (plant hairs) on its outer tepals and on the ovary. The chromosome count is shared with Victoria cruziana, but differs from Victoria amazonica. It is also most similar to Victoria cruziana. Some features have an overlapping range, however in combination many differences can be observed.

=== Position within the genus Victoria ===
This species is the sister group to Victoria cruziana. This leads to the following relationships:

- Victoria
  - - Victoria cruziana
    - Victoria boliviana
  - Victoria amazonica

== Etymology ==
The specific epithet boliviana references its origin in Bolivia.

== Ecology ==
=== Habitat ===
This species is native to the Bolivian wetlands.

=== Pollination ===
It is pollinated by beetles. Flowers of the genus Victoria are pollinated by beetles of the genus Cyclocephala.

== History ==
Specimens of this species have remained unrecognised as distinct entities for a long time, although they were present in collections, including a drawing held in Kew from an 1845 specimen. Bolivian seeds were donated to the Royal Botanic Gardens Kew in 2016. Based on this material genetic studies were made, which resulted in the recognition of this third Victoria species as a separate and distinct entity.

== Conservation ==
This species is estimated to fall between the IUCN Red List categories Vulnerable (VU) and Endangered (EN). There are five known populations present in Bolivia.
