= Victoria colombiana =

Scientific classification
- Kingdom: Plantae
- Clade: Tracheophytes
- Clade: Angiosperms
- Order: Nymphaeales
- Family: Nymphaeaceae
- Genus: Victoria
- Species: V. colombiana

Binomial name
- Victoria colombiana Magdalena, Bernal-Rodr. & Christenh.
- It is endemic to Colombia.

Species of plant

Victoria colombiana is a species of aquatic plant in the family Nymphaeaceae endemic to Colombia. It may be a critically endangered species.

== Description ==
Vegetative characteristics

The floating leaves are up to 2 m (6 ft 7 in) wide. They appear between April and October.

Generative characteristics

The ephemeral flowers have a cubic-globose ovary with flexible, short prickles, and sunken lateral faces. The flowers appear in July and August.

== Taxonomy ==
It was described by Carlos Magdalena, Mauricio Bernal-Rodríguez, and Maarten Joost Maria Christenhusz in 2026. It was discovered in the Orinoco basin in Colombia having been first noticed in a 2021 Instagram post; it was one of two newly described species in 2026 and can be detected from space.

Victoria colombiana in Guainía, Colombia, May 2021

=== Etymology ===
The specific epithet colombiana refers to the country Colombia, where it is found.

== Distribution and habitat ==
V. colombiana is endemic to Colombia, where it has been recorded from the Inirida River of the Orinoco basin jungle. The type specimen was collected on the 28 July 2024 by Mauricio Bernal, Carlos Magdalena, Nilo Rodríguez, Jaime Hernández, and Gustavo Melo in the Cejal Lake, El Paujil Indigenous Reserve, Inírida Municipality, Guainía Department, Colombia.

== Conservation ==
It has been estimated that there are between 30 and 50 Victoria colombiana waterlily plants in the wild, making them extremely rare and at risk of extinction. The Bogotá Botanical Garden plans to establish a new population in a more accessible location within the indigenous territory. Seed will be collected for the cultivation of Victoria colombiana in ex situ collections of the Bogotá Botanical Garden and the Royal Botanic Gardens, Kew.
