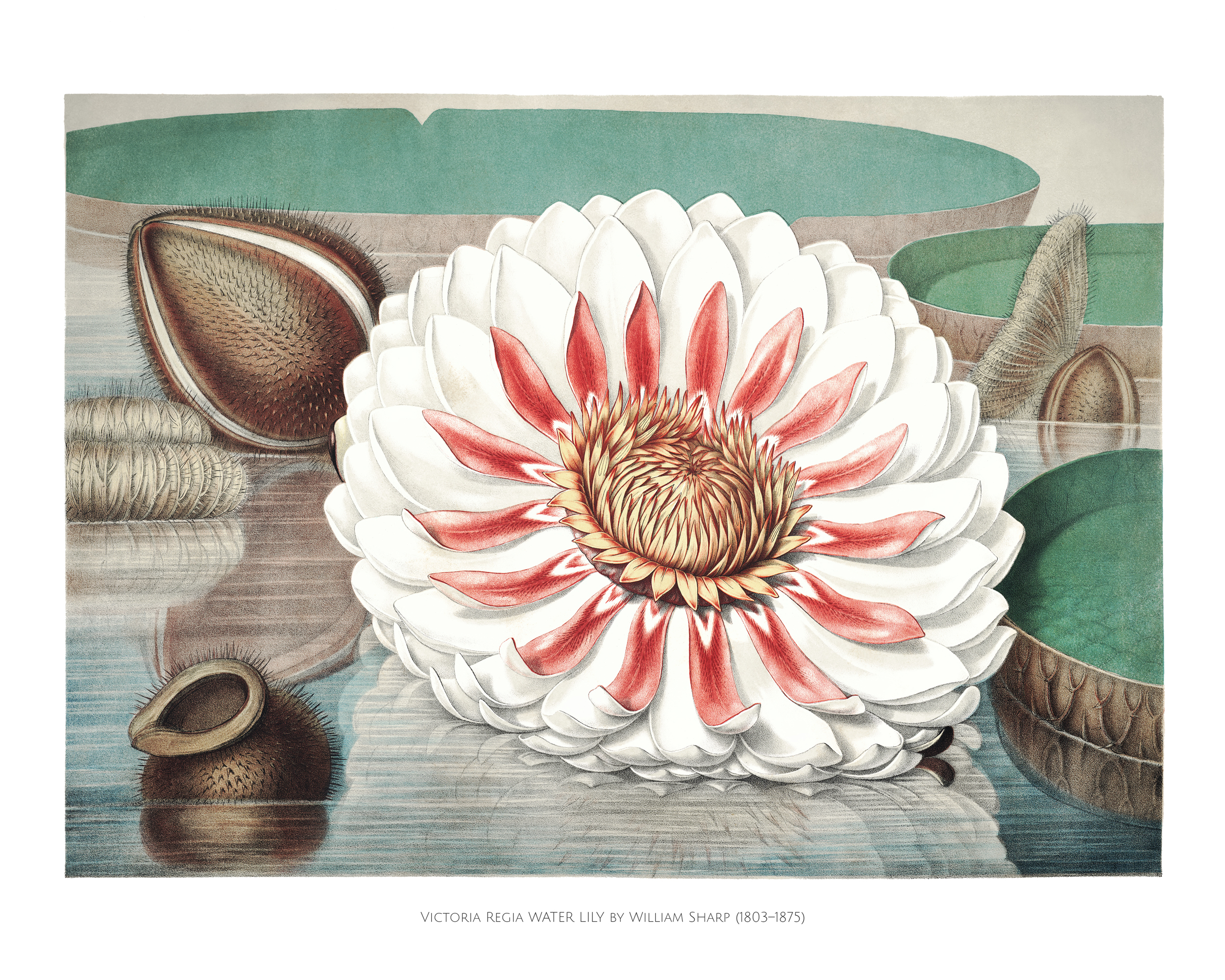
- Botanical illustration of Victoria amazonica

Scientific classification
- Kingdom: Plantae
- Clade: Tracheophytes
- Clade: Angiosperms
- Order: Nymphaeales
- Family: Nymphaeaceae
- Genus: Victoria; R.H.Schomb.

Type species
- Victoria regina R.H.Schomb.

Species
- See text

Synonyms
- Victoria Lindl.; Victoria J. E. Gray

= Victoria (plant) =

Genus of aquatic plants

Victoria or giant waterlily is a genus of aquatic herbs in the plant family Nymphaeaceae. The leaves are a remarkable size; Victoria boliviana produces leaves up to 3.2 metres (10 ft) in width. The genus name was given in honour of Queen Victoria of the United Kingdom.

== Description ==
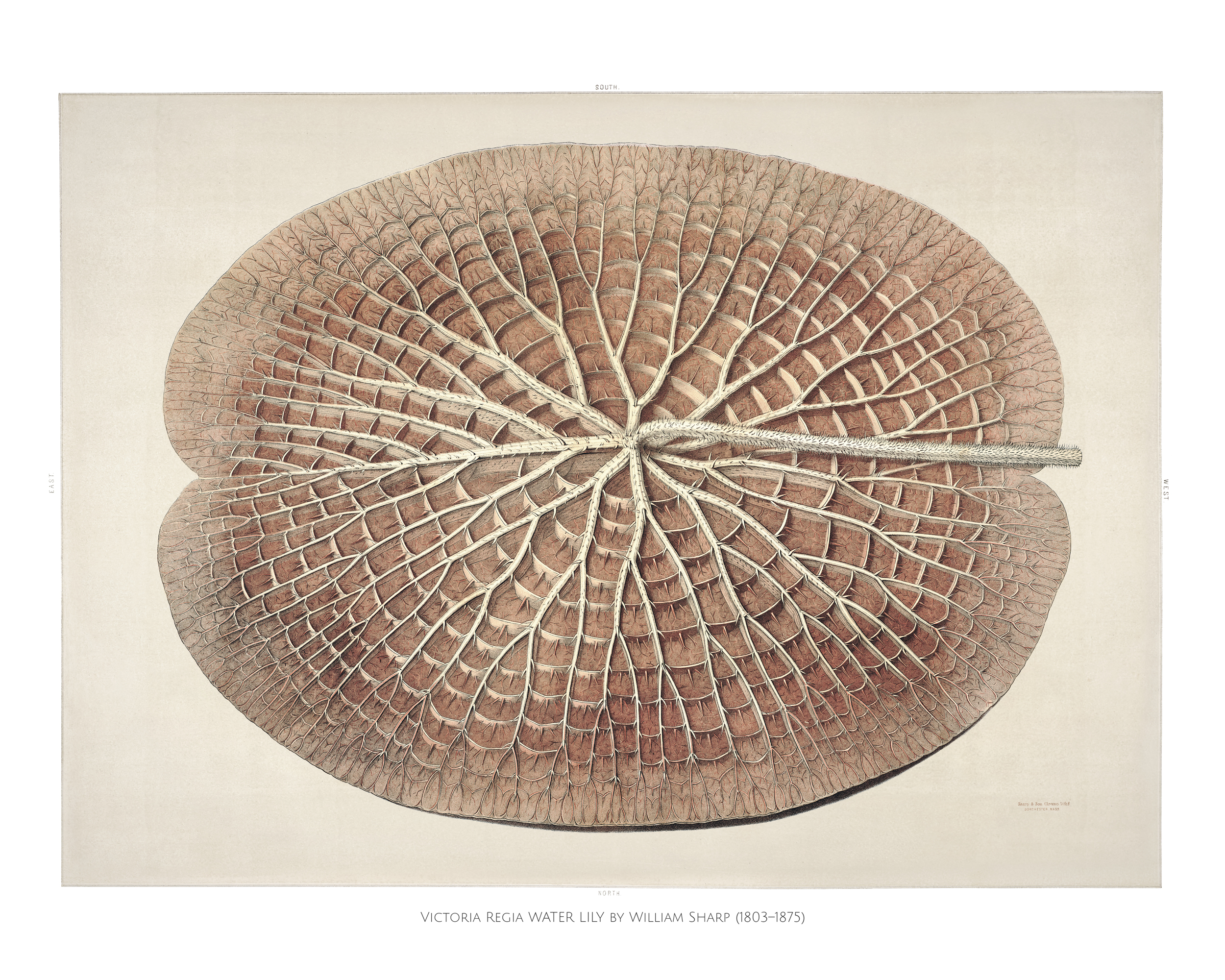
Underside of Victoria amazonica leaf

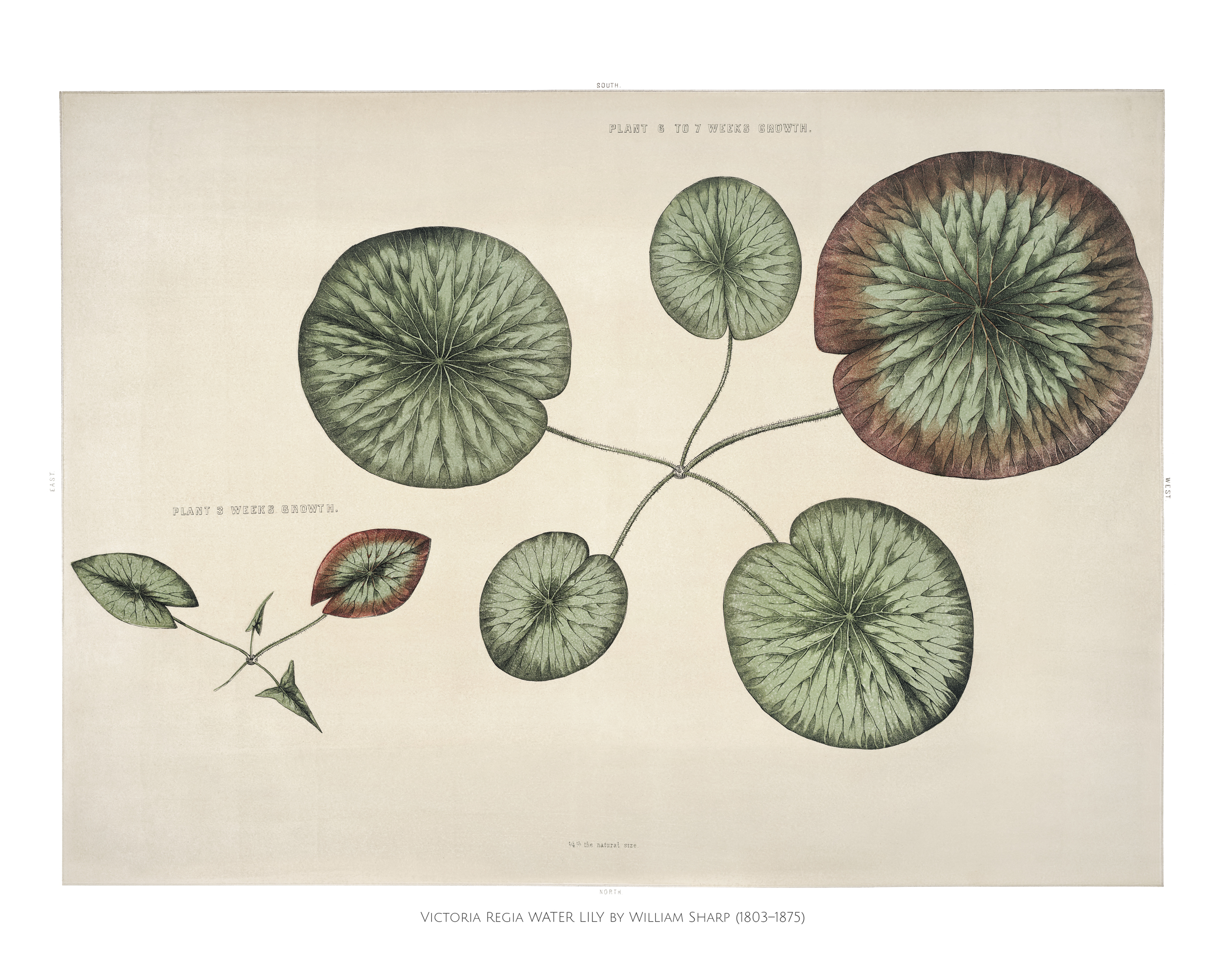
Illustration of various stages of growth of Victoria amazonica with a young seedling (left) and a more mature plant (right)

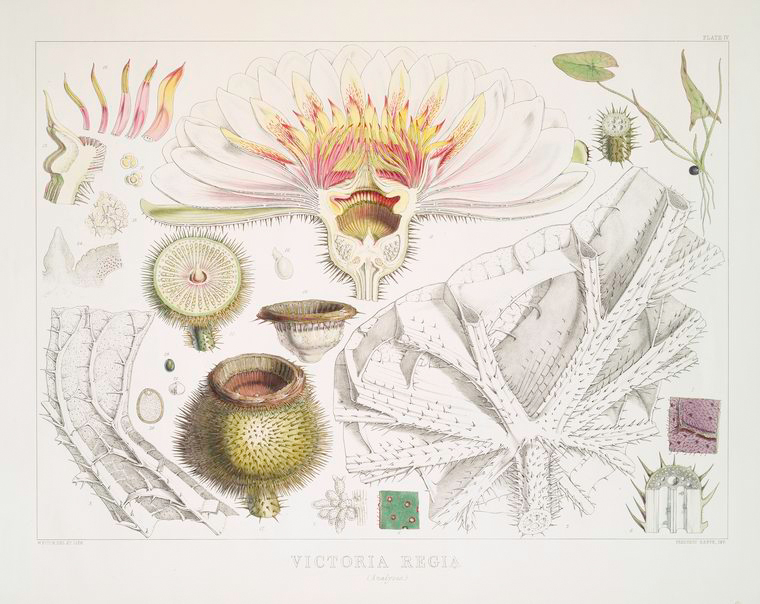
Illustration of Victoria amazonica

=== Vegetative characteristics ===
Victoria species are rhizomatous, aquatic, short-lived, perennial herbs with tuberous rhizomes bearing contractile adventitious roots. The floating leaves are peltate and orbicular. The margin of the lamina is raised to form a rim 10–20 cm (4–8 in) high. The lamina possesses stomatodes (i.e. microscopic perforations) which are believed to allow rainwater to escape. The leaves emerge from a stipular sheath 16 cm (6 in) long and wide or more. The abaxial leaf surface possesses prominent, reticulate venation. In Victoria amazonica the leaves are glabrous, with long, hard spines and the underside is red. In Victoria cruziana the leaves are fuzzy with soft spines and the underside is purple. The shape of the rims is also different.

=== Generative characteristics ===
The up to 25 cm wide, nocturnal, thermogenic, solitary, actinomorphic, chasmogamous, protogynous flowers have prickly pedicels with 4 primary and 8 secondary air canals. The flowers have four petaloid, 12 cm long, and 7–8 cm wide sepals. The 50-100 petals gradually transition towards the shape of the stamens, however there is an abrupt change between the innermost petals to the outermost staminodia. The androeceum consists of 150–200 stamens. The gynoecium consists of 30–44 fused carpels. The 0–15 cm wide, spiny, irregularly dehiscencent fruit bears arillate, glabrous, smooth or granular seeds. Proliferating pseudanthia are absent.

=== Cytology ===
The ploidy level is 2x and the chromosome count ranges from 2n = 20 to 2n = 24.

== Taxonomy ==
Victoria R.H.Schomb. was published by Robert Hermann Schomburgk in September 1837. The type species is Victoria regina R.H.Schomb. The genus has two synonyms, both published within the same year with the same name: Victoria Lindl. published by John Lindley in October 1837 and Victoria J. E. Gray published by John Edward Gray in December 1837. There is, however, disagreement over the correct taxon authority. Victoria R.H.Schomb. is seen as correct by several sources, but Victoria Lindl. is also widely regarded as correct, despite being published a month later.

=== Species ===
Image	Scientific name	Distribution	Description
	Victoria amazonica (Poepp.) J.C. Sowerby	shallow waters of the Amazon River basin, such as oxbow lakes and bayous	The flowers are white the first night they are open and become pink the second night. They are up to 40 cm in diameter, and are pollinated by scarab beetles. According to Parodi, both V. amazonica and V. cruziana can occasionally produce flowers up to 50 centimetres (20 in) in width. The flower is depicted in the Guyanese coat of arms. Fayaz gives the same maximum width for V. amazonica.
	Victoria boliviana Magdalena & L.T.Sm.	Bolivia	Leaves reaching more than 3 metres (9.8 ft) in width, larger seed and ovule size
	Victoria colombiana Magdalena, Bernal-Rodr. & Christenh.	Upper Orinoco basin in Colombia.	First noticed in an Instagram post and can be seen from space.
	Victoria cruziana A.D.Orb.	Parana-Paraguay basin	Slightly smaller than V. amazonica, with the underside of the leaves purple rather than the red of V. amazonica, and covered with a peachlike fuzz lacking in V. amazonica. V. cruziana opens its flowers at dusk.
	Victoria mattogrossensis (Malme) Magdalena & C.Martel	Pantanal region, Brazil.	An updated key to species is in the paper.

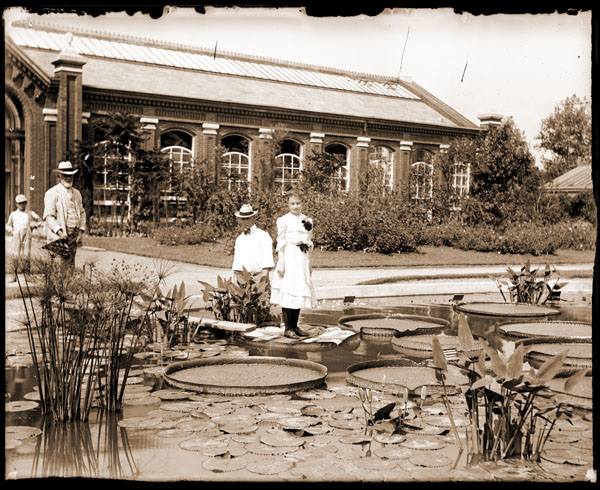
A woman standing on a leaf of Victoria cruziana in the lily pond in front of the Linnaean House of the Missouri Botanical Garden. A wooden plank and a towel is placed on the pad to distribute the weight over the leaf's surface.

=== Evolutionary relationships ===
Together with the genus Euryale, Victoria may be placed within the genus Nymphaea, rendering it paraphyletic in its current circumscription.

== Ecology ==
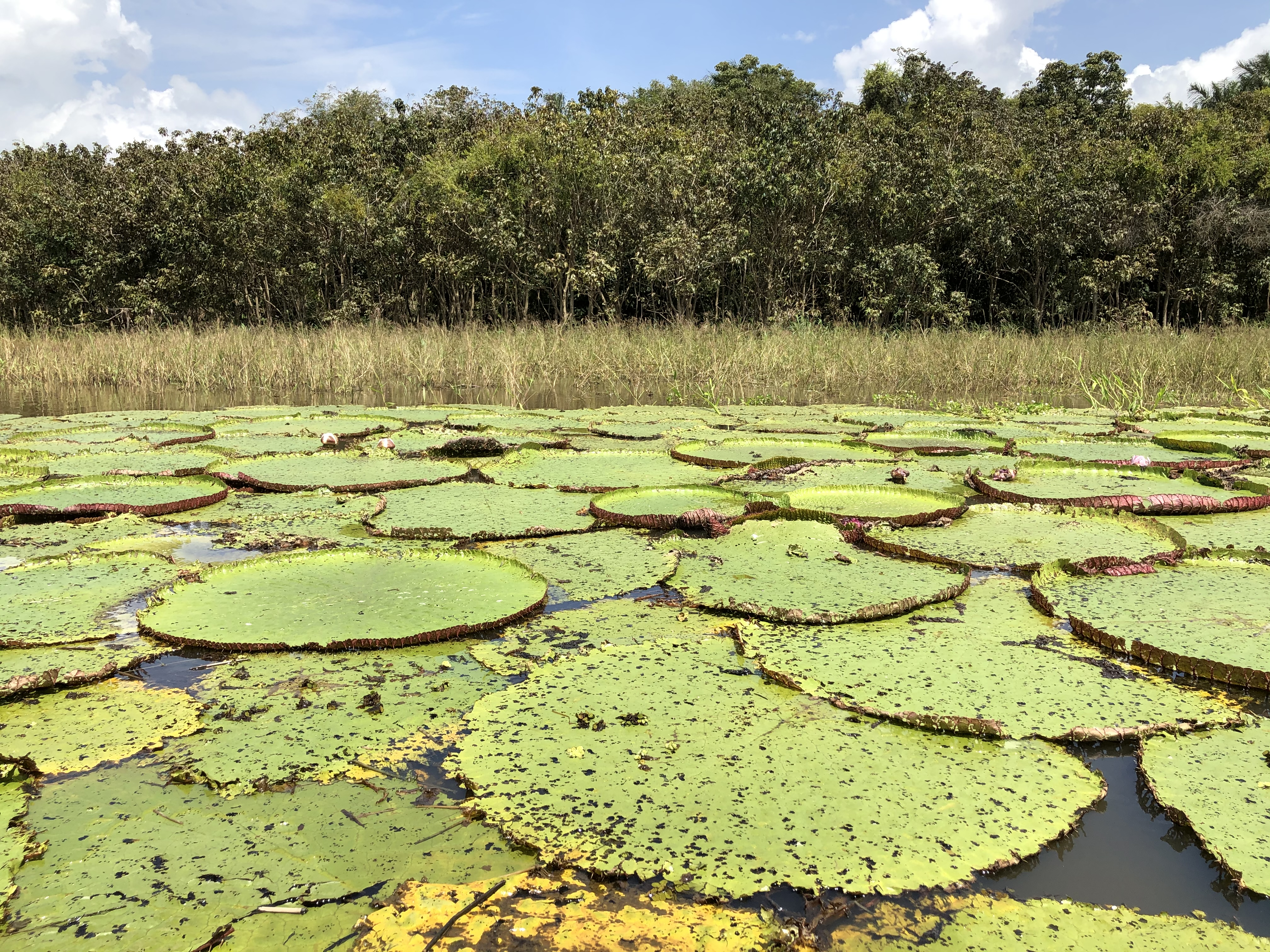
Victoria amazonica in its natural habitat near Manaus, Brazil

Habitat

Species are aquatic: occurring in lakes and streams.

Pollination

Victoria amazonica flowers are known to be pollinated by Cyclocephala beetles.

== Use ==
=== Horticulture ===
Victoria is a popular ornamental plant.

=== Food ===
The seeds, petioles, and rhizomes are used as food.

=== Other uses ===
Root extracts are used as black dye.
