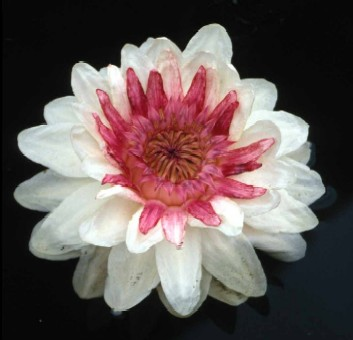
- Flower of Victoria cruziana
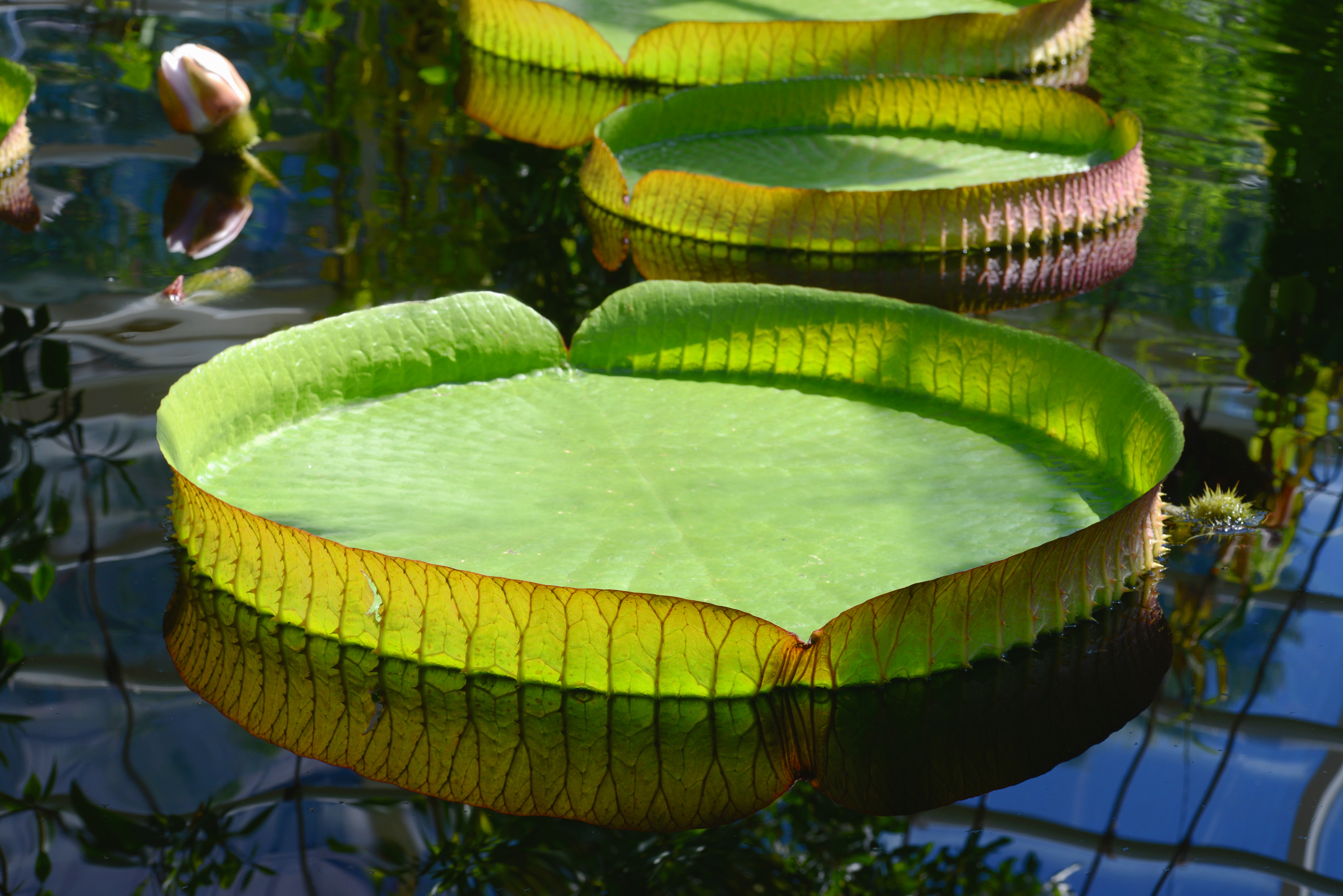
- Leaf of a Santa Cruz water lily (Victoria cruziana). Botanical Garden of Helsinki, Finland.

Scientific classification
- Kingdom: Plantae
- Clade: Tracheophytes
- Clade: Angiosperms
- Order: Nymphaeales
- Family: Nymphaeaceae
- Genus: Victoria
- Species: V. cruziana

Binomial name
- Victoria cruziana A.D.Orb.

= Victoria cruziana =

Species of aquatic plant

Victoria cruziana (Santa Cruz water lily, water platter, yrupe, synonym Victoria argentina Burmeist.) is a tropical species of flowering plant, of the Nymphaeaceae family of water lilies native to South America, primarily Brazil, Bolivia, Argentina and Paraguay.

== Description ==
The plant is a popular water garden plant in botanical gardens where its very large leaves can reach their fullest, up to 2 m wide with a thick rim up to 20 cm high, although rims up to 23 cm have been recorded. It can be grown in cooler waters than its sisters within the genus, the more familiar giant waterlily, Victoria amazonica and the recently discovered Victoria boliviana. A 25 cm diameter flower blooms for two days, arising from the underwater bud, as a white flower that turns to a deep pink on the second and final day of its bloom. V. cruziana is a thermogenetic or heat-producing plant. The floral stigma are attached to a cup that is protected by spines, and the floral cup begins heating up in the bud, then, as the flower opens, it releases a strong sweet scent to attract pollinating beetles of the genus Cyclocephala of the family Scarabaeidae, then continues to provide heat to the flower while the beetles are pollinating.

== Cytology ==
The diploid chromosome count of Victoria cruziana is 2n = 24. The chloroplast genome is 158993 bp long.

== Taxonomy ==
Victoria cruziana was discovered in Bolivia on one of many expeditions through the country by Alcide d'Orbigny whose presence was sponsored by Andrés de Santa Cruz. The first collected specimens were returned to France where they were named in honor of Santa Cruz by Alcide's brother, Charles Henry Dessalines d'Orbigny.

It was first described in 1840 by Alcide d'Orbigny in Annales des Sciences Naturelles; Botanique, Ser. 2, 13, p. 57. Synonyms for Victoria cruziana A.D.Orb. are: Victoria argentina Burmeist. noun nud., Victoria cruziana var. malmei F.Henkel et al., Victoria cruziana f. matogrossensis Malme, Victoria cruziana f. trickeri F.Henkel ex Malme, Victoria cruziana var. trickeri F.Henkel et al., Victoria regia var (A.D.Orb.) C.Lawson, Victoria trickeri (F.Henkel ex Malme) hort. ex Mutzek.
