= Heslop-Harrison =

Heslop-Harrison is a surname, and can be:

- George Heslop-Harrison (1911–1964), British entomologist
- Jack Heslop-Harrison (1920–1998), British botanist
- John William Heslop-Harrison (1881–1967), British academic

== See also ==
- Heslop
- Harrison (name)
