= Philip G. Fothergill =

British biologist and historian of science

Dr Philip Gilbert Fothergill FRSE FIAL (1908–1967) was a British biologist and historian of science.

== Biography ==
He was born on 21 February 1908 the son of Dr Leopold Fothergill, a physician. He was educated at St. Joseph's College, Dumfries. He then attended Durham University graduating BSc and then receiving a doctorate (PhD) in 1934.

Fothergill worked in the Department of Botany and Genetics at King's College, Newcastle. From 1953 he worked as a senior university lecturer in botany. He wrote scientific papers on mycology and experimental cytology. He was a Roman Catholic.

In 1955 he was elected a Fellow of the Royal Society of Edinburgh. His proposers were George Heslop-Harrison, John Heslop-Harrison, Alexander Milne and William Fisher Cassie.

He died on 24 June 1967.

== Works ==
=== Historical Aspects of Organic Evolution ===
Fothergill is most well known for his book Historical Aspects of Organic Evolution (1952) which was widely reviewed. The book traced the development of evolution from 600 B. C. to the twentieth century and cited 750 references to original sources. The biologist James H. Birnie praised the book commenting "it is obvious that the author has kept his personal opinions in the background and has considered the data without bias." The philosopher Lawrence Haworth also gave it a positive review stating "the author approaches his subject with an admirable impartiality. The result is a competent survey of evolutionary theory which will be intelligible to the interested layman."

Criticism came from the botanist Conway Zirkle who commented in a 1954 review "there is no evidence presented [that] the author has understood or digested the great advances made in evolutionary theory during the past twenty years." Fothergill had supported the neo-Lamarckian experiments of Paul Kammerer but according to Zirkle they had been discredited. The geneticist H. Bentley Glass heavily criticized the book for "being biased by both the author's inclination to Lamarckism, and by his religious views." Glass wrote that the book was too uncritically accepting of Lamarckism, orthogenesis and John Christopher Willis' age and area hypothesis whilst ignoring evidence of their refutation.

The biologist Ernst Mayr wrote that the "book suffers from an overzealous belief in the inheritance of acquired characters [but] is most useful for a sympathetic account of neo-Lamarckians."

=== Evolution and Christians ===
Fothergill also wrote Evolution and Christians (1961) which examined the bearing of evolutionary biology on the Roman Catholic faith and doctrine. It also documented the history of evolution from the Greeks to Mendel, modern evolutionary theories and hominid paleontology. The book received a positive review from John C. Green who noted "The evidences of evolution are marshalled in a clear and orderly fashion, with abundant reference to the scientific literature. Controversial issues are handled with balance and judgment; every effort is made to present conflicting views impartially."

In the second half of the book, Fothergill proposed possible biological explanations for Adam and Eve involving ordinary methods of sexual reproduction. He proposed that Adam was born from pre-hominid parents and was the father of Eve or they were both fraternal twins.

== Publications ==
- Historical Aspects of Organic Evolution [foreword by John William Heslop-Harrison] (1952)
- Life and Its Origin: A Discussion (1958)
- A Christian Interpretation of Evolution (1967)
- Evolution and Christians (1961)
