= Sergei Ivanovich Tomkeieff =

20th-century geologist

- Сергей Иванович Томкеев
- Born: 1892.10.20; Vilna
- Died: 1968.10.27 (76); Newcastle-upon-Tyne
- Citizenship: Russian Empire, UKGB
- Education: Petrograd Polytechnic Institute
- Known for: Petrology, History of Geology
- Awards: Lyell Medal (1966)
- Scientific career
- Fields: Geology
- Workplaces: Anderson College
- Doctoral advisor: F. Levinson-Lessing

Prof Sergei Ivanovich Tomkeieff FRSE FGS (1892–1968) was a 20th-century Russian and British geologist and petrologist who won the Geological Society's Lyell Medal in 1966.

== Life ==
Tomkeieff was born on 20 October 1892 in Vilna, in the Russian Empire, and studied petrology in Petrograd Polytechnic Institute. Tomkeieff came to Britain either during or just after the First World War, and began lecturing in geology at Anderson College in Newcastle-upon-Tyne in 1920.

In 1948 Tomkeieff was elected a fellow of the Royal Society of Edinburgh, proposed by Arthur Holmes, James Ernest Richey, Sir Edward Battersby Bailey, Heslop Harrison, George Walter Tyrrell, John Weir, and H. B. Donald.

In 1957 Tomkeieff became professor of petrology at the Anderson College.

Tomkeieff died on 27 October 1968 in Newcastle aged 76.

== Publications ==
Author of about 150 publications, among them:

- The Tholeite Dyke at Cowgate (1953)
- Coals, Bitumens and other Related Fossil Carbonaceous Substances (1954)
- Isle of Arran (1961)
- The Economic Geology of Quarried Materials (1969)
- Dictionary of Petrology (1983) (posthumous)

== Links ==
- Obituarу: Professor S.I. Tomkeieff // Nature. 1968. Vol. 220. N 5170. P. 939.
- Bibliography and documents in Information System "History of Geology and Mining".
- Works by or about Sergei Ivanovich Tomkeieff at the Internet Archive
