= Pieter Baas =

Dutch botanist (1944–2024)

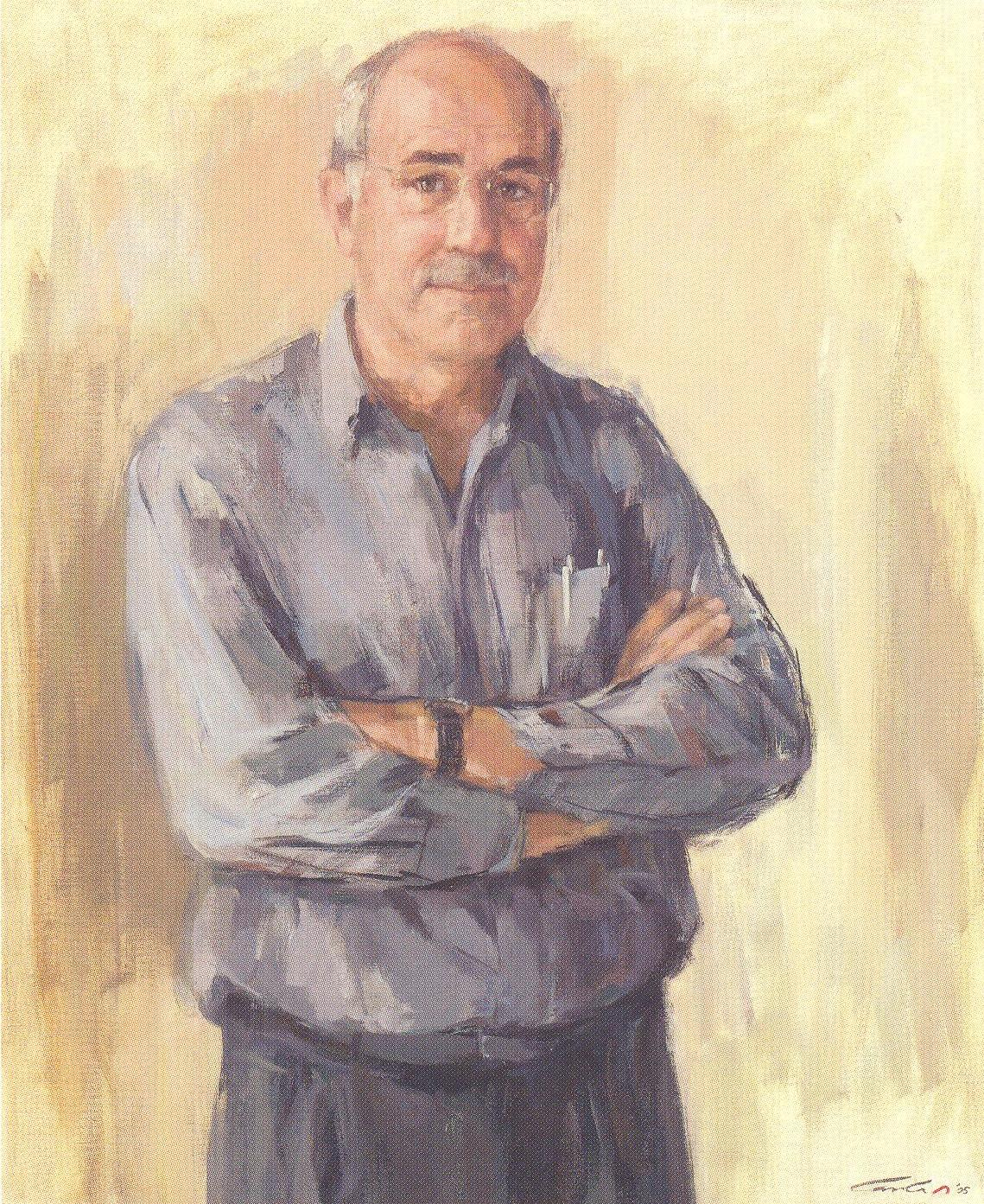
- Baas in a 2005 portrait by Carla Rodenberg
- Born: 28 April 1944; Wieringermeer, Netherlands
- Died: 29 April 2024 (aged 80)
- Education: Leiden University
- Known for: Rijksherbarium of Leiden University; Wood anatomy work
- Awards: Royal Netherlands Academy of Arts and Sciences (2000); Linnean Medal (2003)
- Scientific career
- Fields: Botany, plant systematics, wood anatomy
- Workplaces: Leiden University, National Herbarium of the Netherlands
- Thesis: Comparative anatomy of Ilex, Nemopanthus, Sphenostemon, Phelline, and Oncotheca (1975)

Pieter Baas (28 April 1944 – 29 April 2024) was a Dutch botanist and emeritus professor of plant systematics at the Leiden University, who was a distinguished fellow of the International Academy of Wood Science.

He served as director of the Rijksherbarium of Leiden University between 1991 and 1999. When the institute was faced with budget cuts in 1993 he managed to preserve the collection by joining it with the university collections of Wageningen and Utrecht. This led to the founding of the National Herbarium of the Netherlands in 1999. Baas subsequently became director of the institute and served until 2005.

As a botanist, Baas specialised in wood anatomy, and was an honorary fellow of the International Academy of Wood Science. Most of his pioneering research work in wood anatomy has been jointly made with the American botanist and wood scientist, Elisabeth Wheeler.

== Early life and career ==
Baas was born on 28 April 1944 in the municipality of Wieringermeer. He attended the MULO and later the HBS.

Baas grew up with a broad interest in science. At age 17, while harvesting potatoes he saw a Natterjack toad crossing a path, appreciated the beauty of nature and decided to study natural history after earlier having contemplated studying history.

In 1962 Baas started studying biology at Leiden University. In his first year of biology Baas hated plant systematics as he hardly knew any plants or animals. He preferred plant anatomy and physiology. While studying he was offered a job at the Rijksherbarium, the herbarium of Leiden University, by its director Cornelis Gijsbert Gerrit Jan van Steenis. Baas rejected the offer, having no interest in working in a herbarium. For his final year of studying Baas wished to stay at the Royal Botanic Gardens, Kew. Van Steenis agreed to this if Baas took up a course of systematics. Between 1968 and 1969 Baas studied at the Jodrell Laboratory of the Royal Botanic Gardens under Professor Charles Russell Metcalfe. On his return from the United Kingdom Baas approached Van Steenis and asked to be employed as a wood anatomy expert. In 1969 Baas became an employee of the Rijksherbarium.

In 1975 Baas earned his PhD in wood anatomy, with a thesis entitled: Comparative anatomy of Ilex, Nemopanthus, Sphenostemon, Phelline, and Oncotheca. In 1987 he became professor (Bijzonder hoogleraar, paid from non-university funds) of plant systematics at Leiden University. In 1989 he was chairman of the organizing committee for the first Flora Malesiana Symposium. In 1991 he became a regular professor, succeeding Cornelis Kalkman.

== National Herbarium of the Netherlands ==
In 1991 Baas became scientific-director of the Rijksherbarium. Baas was pressured to take over the position from Cornelis Kalkman. Although content as a researcher and not very interested in directing and managing, Baas took up the position of director out of a sense of duty.

Two years after starting as director, the Rijksherbarium was faced with a plan of the dean of the University Faculty of Mathematics and Natural Sciences to slash the budget by half, which would have forced Baas to fire all scientific staff. Baas informed Queen Beatrix of the Netherlands of the plan. Beatrix discussed the matter with the Minister of Education, Culture & Sciences, Jo Ritzen. Ritzen preferred to see the pieces of the collection returned to their countries of origin. A six-year struggle ensued, after which the Ministry set aside money for broad-value biological collections. Baas called this "his finest moment".

The university board and the Royal Netherlands Academy of Arts and Sciences aided Baas in his wish to see the collection preserved and a special fund was established. In 1999 the National Herbarium of the Netherlands was formed from the collections of the herbariums of the universities of Leiden, Utrecht University and Wageningen. Ritzen subsequently denied the influence of Beatrix in the matter while Baas was convinced that Beatrix helped with the formation of the institute. Baas became director of the newly formed National Herbarium.

During his term as director, Baas managed to improve digitalization efforts and nature conservancy projects at the institute. Furthermore, a start at DNA sequencing the collection was made. The National Herbarium also joined forces with the Naturalis Biodiversity Center, the Zoological Museum Amsterdam, and the Centraalbureau voor Schimmelcultures to become a biodiversity research centre.

Baas retired as professor in April and as director in September 2005, and was succeeded by Erik Smets. Until age 65, he maintained a zero-hour contract at the institute, and then returned to his research on wood anatomy. As of 2013 he was still active as professor emeritus and honorary staff member at the Naturalis Biodiversity Center, the successor institute to the National Herbarium of the Netherlands.

== Research ==
Baas's principal research was in the evolution of anatomical diversity in wood and in the significance of tree biology as it relates to global environmental change. He was also interested in plant anatomy, both systematic and phylogenetic, wood culture, biodiversity, biohistory, conservation, as well as in microscopic wood identification. He studied the role of botanical gardens in education and research.

As of 1976 Baas was Editor-in-Chief of the International Association of Wood Anatomists Journal. As an expert on wood anatomy, Baas was at times asked to be a scientific expert on police investigations regarding wooden weapons or tools.

== Awards, honours and personal life ==
In 1987 Baas became a corresponding member of the Botanical Society of America and a member of the Royal Netherlands Academy of Arts and Sciences in 2000. He was an elected fellow of The International Academy of Wood Science. In 2003 he won the Linnean Medal of the Linnean Society of London. Baas became a Knight in the Order of the Netherlands Lion in 2005. Ilex baasii and Baasoxylon are named after him.

While in Sri Lanka in 2004, Baas survived the Indian Ocean tsunami. He died on 29 April 2024, at the age of 80.
