= Darwin Medal =

Medal awarded by the Royal Society

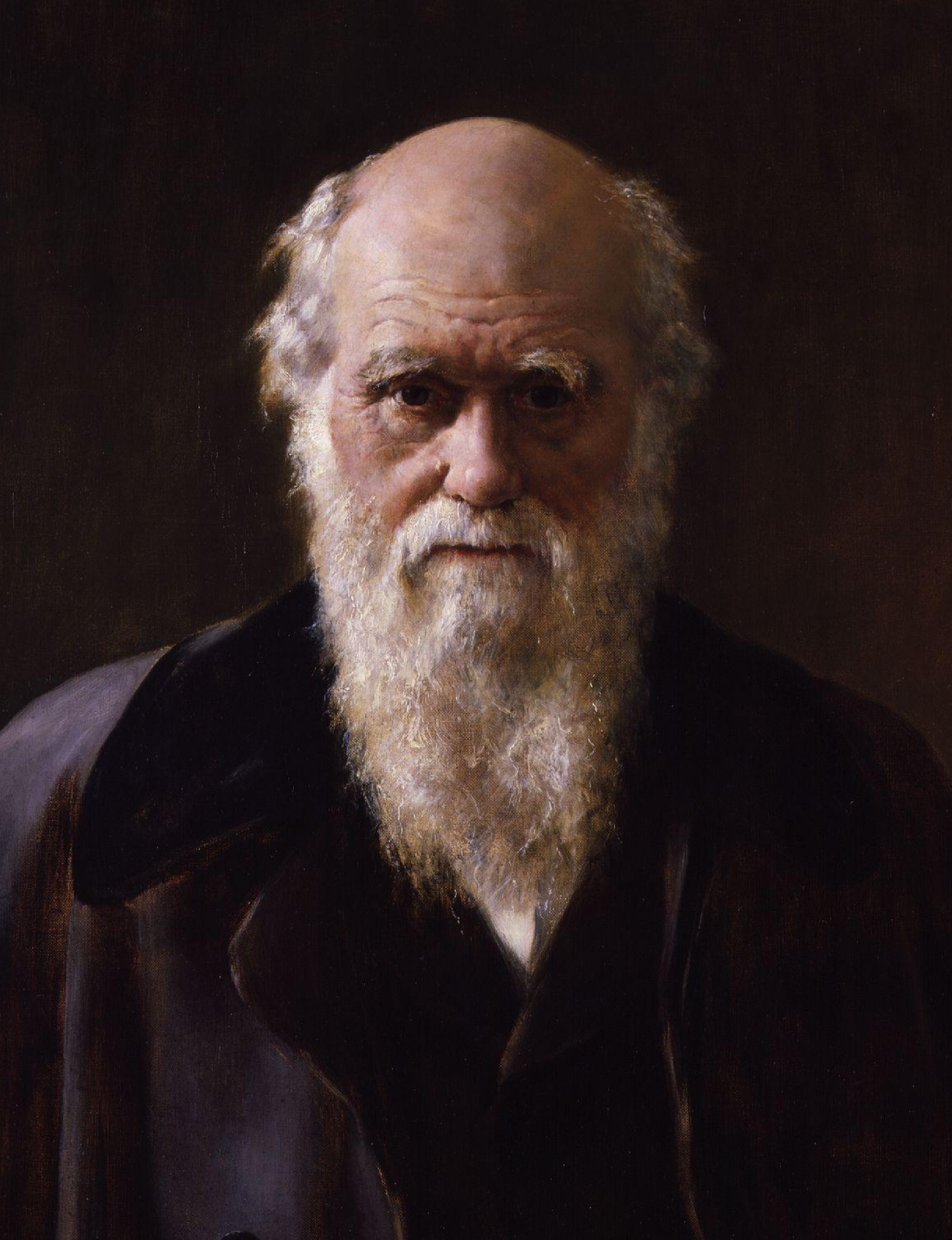
- Charles Darwin
- Awarded for: "distinction in evolution, biological diversity and developmental, population and organismal biology"
- Presented by: Royal Society
- First award: 1890
- Website: https://royalsociety.org/grants-schemes-awards/awards/darwin-medal/

The Darwin Medal is one of the medals awarded by the Royal Society for "distinction in evolution, biological diversity and developmental, population and organismal biology".

In 1885, the International Darwin Memorial Fund was transferred to the Royal Society. The fund was devoted for promotion of biological research, and was used to establish the Darwin Medal. The medal was first awarded to Alfred Russel Wallace in 1890 for "his independent origination of the theory of the origin of species by natural selection." The medal commemorates the work of English biologist Charles Darwin (1809–1882). Darwin, most famous for his 1859 book On the Origin of Species, was a fellow of the Royal Society, and had received the Royal Medal in 1853 and the Copley Medal in 1864.

The diameter of the Darwin Medal is 2 1/4 inch (5.7 cm). It is made of silver. The obverse has Darwin's portrait, while the reverse has a wreath of plants with Darwin's name in Latin, "Carolus Darwin". It is surrounded by the years of his birth and death in Roman numerals (MDCCCIX and MDCCCLXXXII). The general design of the medal was by John Evans, the president of the Royal Numismatic Society.

Since its creation the Darwin Medal has been awarded over 60 times. Among the recipients are Francis Darwin, Charles Darwin's son, and two married couples: Jack and Yolande Heslop-Harrison in 1982 and Peter and Rosemary Grant in 2002. Initially accompanied by a grant of £100, the medal is currently awarded with a grant of £2,000. All citizens who have been residents of the United Kingdom, Commonwealth of Nations, or the Republic of Ireland for more than three years are eligible for the medal. The medal was awarded biennially from 1890 until 2018; since then it is awarded annually.

== List of recipients ==
List of recipients of the Darwin Medal
| Year | Portrait | Name | Citation | Ref. |
|---|---|---|---|---|
| 1890 | Black-and-white photographic portrait of Alfred Russel Wallace | Alfred Russel Wallace | "For his independent origination of the theory of the origin of species by natural selection." | |
| 1892 | Black-and-white photographic portrait of Joseph Dalton Hooker | Joseph Dalton Hooker | "On account of his important contributions to the progress of systematic botany, as evidenced by the 'Genera Plantarum' and the 'Flora Indica'; but more especially on account of his intimate association with Mr. Darwin in the studies preliminary to the 'Origin of Species'." | |
| 1894 | Black-and-white photographic portrait of Thomas Henry Huxley | Thomas Henry Huxley | "For his researches in comparative anatomy, and especially for his intimate association with Mr. Darwin in relation to the 'Origin of Species'." | |
| 1896 | Black-and-white photographic portrait of Giovanni Battista Grassi | Giovanni Battista Grassi | "For his researches on the life history and societies of the Termitidae, and on the developmental relationship between Leptocephalus and the common eel and other muraenidae." | |
| 1898 | Black-and-white photographic portrait of Karl Pearson | Karl Pearson | "For his work on the quantitative treatment of biological problems." | |
| 1900 | Black-and-white photographic portrait of Ernst Haeckel | Ernst Haeckel | "For his long-continued and highly important work in zoology all of which has been inspired by the spirit of Darwinism." | |
| 1902 | Black-and-white photographic portrait of Francis Galton | Francis Galton | "For his numerous contributions to the exact study of heredity & variation contained in 'Hereditary Genius', 'Natural Inheritance', and other writings." | |
| 1904 | Black-and-white photographic portrait of William Bateson | William Bateson | "For his important contribution to the theory of organic evolution by his researches on variation and heredity." | |
| 1906 | Black-and-white photographic portrait of Hugo de Vries | Hugo de Vries | "On the ground of the significance and extent of his experimental investigations in heredity & Variation." | |
| 1908 | Black-and-white photographic portrait of August Weismann | August Weismann | "On the ground of his eminent services in support of the doctrine of evolution by means of natural selection." | |
| 1910 | Black-and-white photographic portrait of Roland Trimen | Roland Trimen | "On the ground of his South African bionomic researches, in large part undertaken as the outcome of correspondence with Charles Darwin." | |
| 1912 | Black-and-white photographic portrait of Francis Darwin | Francis Darwin | "On the ground of his work in conjunction with Charles Darwin, and his researches in vegetable physiology." | |
| 1914 | Black-and-white photographic portrait of Edward Bagnall Poulton | Edward Bagnall Poulton | "On the ground of his researches in heredity." | |
| 1916 | Black-and-white photographic portrait of Yves Delage | Yves Delage | "On the ground of researches in zoology and biology." | |
| 1918 | Black-and-white photographic portrait of Henry Fairfield Osborn | Henry Fairfield Osborn | "For his valuable researches on vertebrate morphology and palaeontology." | |
| 1920 | Black-and-white photographic portrait of Rowland H. Biffen | Rowland H. Biffen | "On the ground of his work on scientific principles applied to the breeding of plants." | |
| 1922 | — | Reginald C. Punnett | "For his researches in the science of genetics." | |
| 1924 | Black-and-white photographic portrait of Thomas Hunt Morgan | Thomas Hunt Morgan | "For his valuable work in zoology and more especially his researches on heredity and cytology." | |
| 1926 | Black-and-white photographic portrait of Dukinfield Henry Scott | Dukinfield Henry Scott | "For his contributions to palaeophytology, particularly in relation to the period of coal." | |
| 1928 | Black-and-white photographic portrait of Leonard Cockayne | Leonard Cockayne | "For the eminence of his contributions to ecological botany." | |
| 1930 | Black-and-white photographic portrait of Johannes Schmidt | Johannes Schmidt | "For his work on extended oceanographical expeditions; and for his genetic studies in animals and plants." | |
| 1932 | Black-and-white photographic portrait of Carl Erich Correns | Carl Erich Correns | "As one of the three independent discoverers of Mendels publications; and for his distinguished researches in genetics." | |
| 1934 | Black-and-white photographic portrait of Albert Seward | Albert Seward | "In recognition of his work as a palaeobotanist." | |
| 1936 | — | Edgar Johnson Allen | "In recognition of his long continued work for the advancement of marine biology, not only by his own researches but by the great influence he has exerted on very numerous investigations at Plymouth." | |
| 1938 | Black-and-white photographic portrait of Frederick Orpen Bower | Frederick Orpen Bower | "In recognition of his work of acknowledged distinction in the field in which Darwin himself laboured." | |
| 1940 | Black-and-white photographic portrait of James Peter Hill | James Peter Hill | "For his contributions to the solution of problems bearing on the inter-relationships of the main groups of the Mammalia and on the phylogenetic history of the primates, a subject with which Charles Darwin himself was much concerned." | |
| 1942 | — | D. M. S. Watson | "In recognition of his researches on primitive fishes and amphibians which have much advanced the knowledge of the evolution of these groups of animals." | |
| 1944 | Black-and-white photographic portrait of John Stanley Gardiner | John Stanley Gardiner | "In recognition of his work on coral reefs and on the organisms associated with such habitats." | |
| 1946 | — | D'Arcy Thompson | "In recognition of his outstanding contributions to the development of biology." | |
| 1948 | Black-and-white photographic portrait of Ronald Fisher | Ronald Fisher | "In recognition of his distinguished contributions to the theory of natural selection, the concept of its gene complex and the evolution of dominance." | |
| 1950 | Black-and-white photographic portrait of Felix Eugen Fritsch | Felix Eugen Fritsch | "For his distinguished contributions to the study of algology." | |
| 1952 | Black-and-white photographic portrait of J. B. S. Haldane | J. B. S. Haldane | "In recognition of his initiation of the modern phase of the study of the evolution of living populations." | |
| 1954 | — | E. B. Ford | "In recognition of his distinguished contributions to the genetical theory of evolution by natural selection, particularly in natural populations." | |
| 1956 | Black-and-white photographic portrait of Julian Sorell Huxley | Julian Sorell Huxley | "In recognition of his distinguished contributions to the study and theory of evolution." | |
| 1958 | — | Gavin de Beer | "In recognition of his distinguished contributions to evolutionary biology." | |
| 1960 | — | E. J. H. Corner | "In recognition of his distinguished and strikingly original botanical work in tropical forests." | |
| 1962 | — | George Gaylord Simpson | "In recognition of his distinguished contributions to general evolutionary theory, based on a profound study of palaeontology, particularly of vertebrates." | |
| 1964 | — | Kenneth Mather | "In recognition of his distinguished contributions to knowledge of cytology and genetics." | |
| 1966 | — | Harold Munro Fox | "In recognition of his distinguished and extensive contributions in the field of invertebrate zoology and to our understanding of general biological phenomena." | |
| 1968 | — | Maurice Yonge | "In recognition of his many distinguished contributions to evolutionary biology, particularly of the mollusca." | |
| 1970 | — | Charles Sutherland Elton | "In recognition of the basic concepts he has contributed to the study of animal ecology which, with his foundation of the Bureau of Animal Population, have had international impact." | |
| 1972 | — | David Lack | "In recognition of his distinguished and numerous contributions to ornithology and to our understanding of evolutionary mechanisms." | |
| 1974 | — | Philip Sheppard | "In recognition of his outstanding work on natural populations of butterflies, describing and explaining the operation of natural selection and demonstrating the genetic basis upon which selection operates." | |
| 1976 | — | Charlotte Auerbach | "In recognition of her discovery of and continuing work on chemical mutagenesis." | |
| 1978 | Black-and-white photographic portrait of Guido Pontecorvo | Guido Pontecorvo | "In recognition of his discovery of somatic recombination in fungi which led to the elucidation of an important type of genetic variation." | |
| 1980 | — | Sewall Wright | "In recognition of his outstanding contributions to genetics and evolutionary theory." | |
| 1982 | — | Jack Heslop-Harrison | "In recognition of their major contributions to plant physiology including fundamental studies on insectivorous plants, much of this research carried out jointly." | |
| 1982 | — | Yolande Heslop-Harrison | "In recognition of their major contributions to plant physiology including fundamental studies on insectivorous plants, much of this research carried out jointly." | |
| 1984 | Photographic portrait of Ernst Mayr | Ernst Mayr | "In recognition of his distinguished contributions to evolutionary biology." | |
| 1986 | Photographic portrait of John Maynard Smith | John Maynard Smith | "In recognition of his outstanding success in combining mathematics with biology to enhance our understanding of evolution, in particular the evolution of sex." | |
| 1988 | — | W. D. Hamilton | "In recognition of his distinguished work on evolutionary theory. His contributions include the theory of kin selection to account for altruistic behaviour and the theoretical demonstration of a link between disease resistance and the evolution of sex." | |
| 1990 | Photographic portrait of John Harper | John Harper | "For his research on the population biology and evolution of plants which has greatly improved understanding of the adaptation of plants to their environment." | |
| 1992 | — | Motoo Kimura | "Distinguished for his work on molecular evolution, in particular on the role of stochastic events in determining the rate of evolution." | |
| 1994 | — | Peter Lawrence | "In recognition of his analysis of pattern formation during insect segmentation, and of his contribution to understanding how genetic processes specify spatial information." | |
| 1996 | Photographic portrait of John Sulston | John Sulston | "In recognition of his leadership in the study of genome analysis with the potential to have a profound impact on the whole of biology." | |
| 1998 | — | Michael Denis Gale | "In recognition of their work on cereal genome organisation and evolution which has revolutionised cereal genetics by showing that the genetics of all the different cereals can be considered in a common framework." | |
| 1998 | — | Graham Moore | "In recognition of their work on cereal genome organisation and evolution which has revolutionised cereal genetics by showing that the genetics of all the different cereals can be considered in a common framework." | |
| 2000 | — | Brian Charlesworth | "In recognition of his distinguished work on selection in age-structured populations, extending the theory to the evolution of ageing, and testing the theories of mutation accumulation and pleiotropy, developing models for the evolution of genetic systems, including sex and recombination, inbreeding and outbreeding, separate sexes and sex chromosomes, segregation distortion and repetitive DNA." | |
| 2002 | Photographic portrait of Peter and Rosemary Grant | Peter and Rosemary Grant | "for their fundamental work on the ecology, breeding and evolution of Darwin's finches on the Galapagos islands. This work has become the classic example of Darwinian evolution in the wild." | |
| 2004 | Photographic portrait of Enrico Coen | Enrico Coen | "for their ground-breaking discoveries about the control of flower development. They have combined molecular and genetic approaches to answer some of Darwins key questions about the natural variation of floral form and the evolution of floral development." | |
| 2004 | — | Rosemary Carpenter | "for their ground-breaking discoveries about the control of flower development. They have combined molecular and genetic approaches to answer some of Darwins key questions about the natural variation of floral form and the evolution of floral development." | |
| 2006 | — | Nick Barton | "for his major and extensive contributions to evolutionary biology, by the application of sophisticated mathematical analysis but focussed on developing biological understanding rather than mathematical niceties." | |
| 2008 | — | Geoff Parker | "for his lifetime contribution to the foundations and development of behavioural ecology, in particular for understanding evolutionary adaptations and their consequences for natural populations." | |
| 2010 | — | Bryan Clarke | "for his original and influential contributions to our understanding of the genetic basis of evolution." | |
| 2012 | — | Tim Clutton-Brock | "for his outstanding work on the diversity of animal societies and demonstration of their effects on the evolution of reproductive strategies, the operation of selection and the dynamics of populations." | |
| 2014 | Photographic portrait of John Sutherland | John Sutherland | "for his novel and convincing work on prebiotic chemistry, in particular his solution to the central problem of nucleoside synthesis." | |
| 2016 | Photographic portrait of Caroline Dean | Caroline Dean | "for her work addressing fundamental questions in the perception of temperature cues and how modifications in epigenetic mechanisms play an important role in adaptation." | |
| 2018 | — | Bill Hill | "for his contribution to our understanding of the genetics of quantitative traits and response to selection" | |
| 2019 | — | Peter Holland | "for his work with many organisms and genes elucidating key aspects of how changes in the genome influence evolution of animal development" | |
| 2020 | — | Robert A. Martienssen | "for outstanding contributions to genetics and epigenetics, including defining the role of RNA interference in inherited gene silencing and in genomic stability in the germ line." | |
| 2021 | — | Dolph Schluter | "for major and fundamental contributions to the understanding of the how species originate, adaptive radiations develop, and geographical patterns of biodiversity emerge and are maintained." | |
| 2022 | — | Martin Embley | "for his fundamental, paradigm-changing contributions to the understanding of mitochondrial endosymbiosis and the origins of eukaryotes in a new two-domain tree of life." | |
| 2023 | — | Peter Campbell | "for his pioneering contributions to somatic evolution, including some of the most creative and influential studies of evolution in cancer and normal tissues." | |
| 2024 | — | Paul M. Sharp | "for his work addressing the origins and evolution of HIV and the malaria parasite Plasmodium." | |
| 2025 | — | Andrew Rambaut | "for the development of the state-of-the-art methodologies for tracking the epidemiology and evolution of viruses, and their application to the west African Ebola outbreak, and the COVID-19 pandemic." | |

== See also ==
- Awards, lectures and medals of the Royal Society
