= Charles Metcalfe =

Charles Metcalfe may refer to:

- Charles Metcalfe, 1st Baron Metcalfe (1785–1846), British colonial administrator
- Charles Metcalfe (British Army officer) (1865–1912), British general
- Charles Russell Metcalfe (1904–1991), English botanist

== See also ==
- Charles D. Metcalf (born 1933), United States Air Force general
- Metcalfe (surname)
