= Harold Munro Fox =

English zoologist (1889–1967)

Professor Harold Munro Fox FRS
- Portrait by Walter Stoneman, 1937
- Born: Harold Munro Fuchs; 28 September 1889; Clapham, London, England
- Died: 29 January 1967 (aged 77); London, England
- Education: Brighton College; Gonville and Caius College, Cambridge
- Occupation: Zoologist
- Employers: See list: Marine Biological Association (1911–1912, 1919); Stazione Zoologica (1912–1913); Royal College of Science (1913–1914, 1919); Royal Army Service Corps (1914–1918); Cairo School of Medicine (1919–1923); Gonville and Caius College (1923–1927?); Birmingham University (1927–1941); Bedford College, London (1941–1954)
- Title: Fullerian Professor of Physiology (1953–1957)
- Spouses: Léonie Thérèse Roger (m. 1917, divorced) Natalia "Natasha" Lvovna (m. 1931)
- Relatives: Alison Settle (sister)
- Awards: Fellow of the Royal Society (1937); Linnean Medal (1959); Darwin Medal (1966)

Harold Munro Fox FRS (né Fuchs; 28 September 1889 – 29 January 1967) was an English zoologist.

== Education and early life ==
He was born Harold Munro Fuchs in Clapham, London, in 1889 to George Gotthilf Fuchs, a former captain in the Prussian Army, and Margaret Isabella Campbell Munro, daughter of Lieutenant Colonel Andrew Munro of the Yorkshire Regiment. However, his parents separated when he was just a few years old. Fox was educated at Brighton College and Gonville and Caius College, Cambridge, where he read for the Natural Sciences Tripos (1908–1911).

== Career ==
After graduation he went to the Plymouth Laboratory of the Marine Biological Association of the United Kingdom (1911–1912), where he worked with Cresswell Shearer and Walter de Morgan on the genetics of sea urchin hybrids. After his year in Plymouth, he went to Naples, Italy, in 1912, where he worked on fertilisation at the Stazione Zoologica for ten months. In 1913 he was appointed lecturer in zoology at the Royal College of Science, London, by Ernest William MacBride.

When the First World War broke out, he enlisted in the Royal Army Service Corps and served with the City of London Yeomanry in the Balkans, Egypt, Salonika (Thessaloniki), and Palestine. It was then when he changed his name from Fuchs to Fox by deed poll. While he was stationed in Egypt, he met his first wife, Léonie Thérèse Roger, the daughter of Henri Roger, a French people official of the Suez Canal Company. They married in 1917. After the war, Fox spent six months back in London working with MacBride again, and also worked at the Marine Biological Association again for some time. However, in 1919 he returned to Cairo on invitation by Edward Hindle to join his staff at the Cairo School of Medicine as lecturer (1919–1923). During this time he finished a thesis on the flagellate protozoan Bodo, the research on which he had begun at Plymouth, and presented it to Gonville and Caius College, Cambridge, to apply for fellowship. His application was accepted in 1920, but he took up the post only in 1923. In Cambridge, he and John Stanley Gardiner organised an expedition to study the fauna of the Suez Canal during 1924–1925.

In 1927, Fox was appointed head of the Department of Zoology and Comparative Anatomy at the University of Birmingham, a post he held until 1941. It was during his time in Birmingham that he and his wife became increasingly estranged from each other and eventually divorced. In 1931, Fox married his second wife, Natalia 'Natasha' Lvovna. He was Professor of Zoology, Bedford College, London, from 1941 to 1954. Because the college had moved from London to Cambridge due to the outbreak of World War II, he was able to work with his former colleagues from Gonville and Caius College again.

On retirement he moved to Queen Mary College, London as a research associate.

His research focused on researching marine invertebrates such as ostracod crustacea. He was elected a Fellow of the Royal Society in 1937 and won the society's Darwin Medal in 1966.

Fox died in St George's Hospital, London, on 29 January 1967.

== Selected publications ==
- The Personality of Animals (1941)

Academic offices
Preceded by Edward James Salisbury	Fullerian Professor of Physiology; 1953–1957	Succeeded by John Zachary Young
