= National Herbarium of the Netherlands =

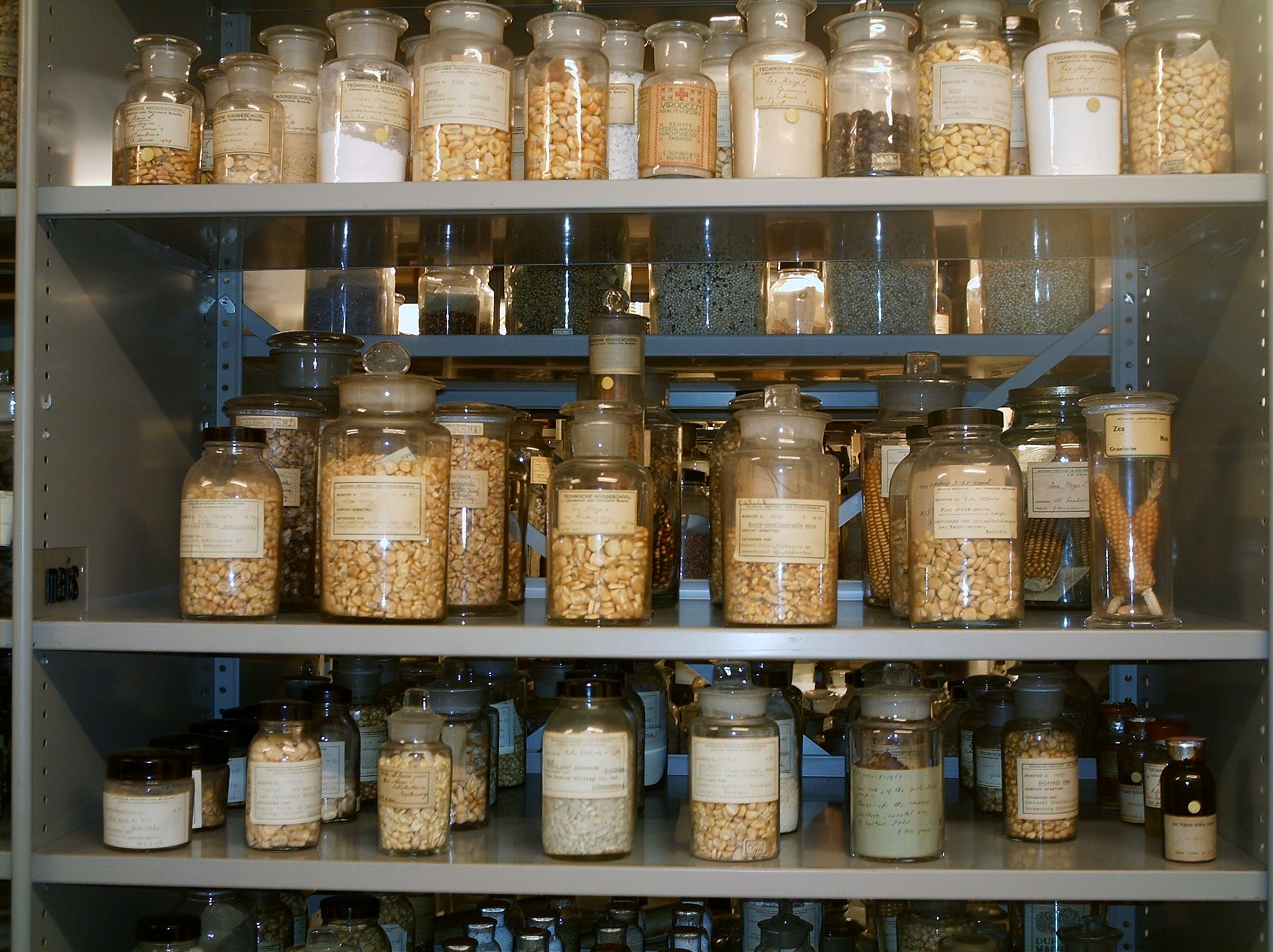
Dried Cereal grains and other products (2007)

The National Herbarium of the Netherlands (Dutch: Nationaal Herbarium Nederland) is one of largest herbaria in the world with some 5.5 million specimens. It was established in 1999 (26 years ago) through a decentralized merger of the major university herbaria of Leiden (also known as the Rijksherbarium), Utrecht and Wageningen. Each of the three had its own focus.

The National Herbarium currently consists of two branches:

- Leiden University
- Wageningen University and Research centre.

The Utrecht herbarium has been closed and in 2009 its stock was transferred to Leiden, where it is curated by the Naturalis Biodiversity Centre. It is planned that Naturalis (the Netherlands' Natural History Museum and Centre for Biodiversity) will run the National Herbarium.

The NHN coordinates several flora projects. "Flora Malesiana" and "Flora of the Guianas" have their seat in Leiden, while the "Flore du Benin" and "Flore du Gabon" are coordinated from Wageningen. Herbaria of several classic botanists are in the collections, e.g.

- David de Gorter

== Access ==
The Herbarium is open to any visitor, professional or amateur, with a legitimate reason to consult the collections. The specimen database is available through Brahms online: Specimen database.

== Directors ==
When the National Herbarium was formed in 1999 Pieter Baas, former director of the Rijksherbarium of Leiden University, became the director. He was succeeded in 2005 by Erik Smets.

== See also ==
- Blumea (journal)
- Cornelis Gijsbert Gerrit Jan van Steenis
- Hortus Botanicus Leiden
