= Stephen Donovan =

Stephen Kenneth Donovan FLS (born 3 June 1954) is a British palaeontologist, who is at Palaeozoic and Mesozoic Macroinvertebrates, Nederlands Centrum voor Biodiversiteit - Naturalis (formerly Nationaal Natuurhistorisch Museum). He previously worked at the Department of Geology at the University of the West Indies in Kingston, Jamaica. He was awarded the Linnean Medal.
