= St Joseph's College, Dumfries =

St. Joseph's College

Location
- Craigs Road; Dumfries, Dumfries and Galloway, DG1 4UU; Scotland; 55.0628°N 3.6008°W

Information
- Type: Comprehensive State School
- Motto: Nisi Dominus Frustra (Without God, all is in vain)
- Religious affiliation: Roman Catholicism
- Founders: Marist Brothers, Saint Marcellin Champagnat
- Local authority: Dumfries and Galloway Council
- Head teacher: Bernadette Jones
- Staff: 60 approx.
- Gender: Coeducational, formerly boys only
- Age: 11 to 18
- Enrolment: 961 (2023)
- Houses: Wallace, Bruce, Douglas, Stewart (and formerly Balliol)
- Colours: Navy blue and gold
- Website: http://stjosephscollege.co.uk

St Joseph's College in Dumfries, South West Scotland, is a Ronan Catholic secondary school. It began as a Catholic boys' boarding school run by Marist Brothers.

== History ==
St Joseph's College was founded in 1875 as both a boarding school and the first Novitiate for the training of Marist Brothers in Great Britain. Brother Walfrid, who founded Celtic Football Club, also helped to found the school and his statue remains in situe. With the exception of one or two female pupils in the 1970's, St Joseph's remained a boarding school for boys until it became part of the state school system in 1981, when the Benedictine Convent School closed. It still accepts Catholic students as priority.

== Buildings ==
The school was originally located elsewhere in Dumfries but was moved to its current location when a local businessman bought the land and donated it to the Marist Brothers. Numerous expansions to the original build have been made: the assembly hall, extensions to the mathematics and French departments, a new separate building for the Religious Education classrooms, and another new building which contains the dining hall and physical education halls. After the school became public, the buildings transferred to Dumfries and Galloway Council, following the sale of part of the school playing fields at Maryfield, for the new medical centre at Gillbrae. The Marist Brothers then had no involvement with the school.

== Campus ==
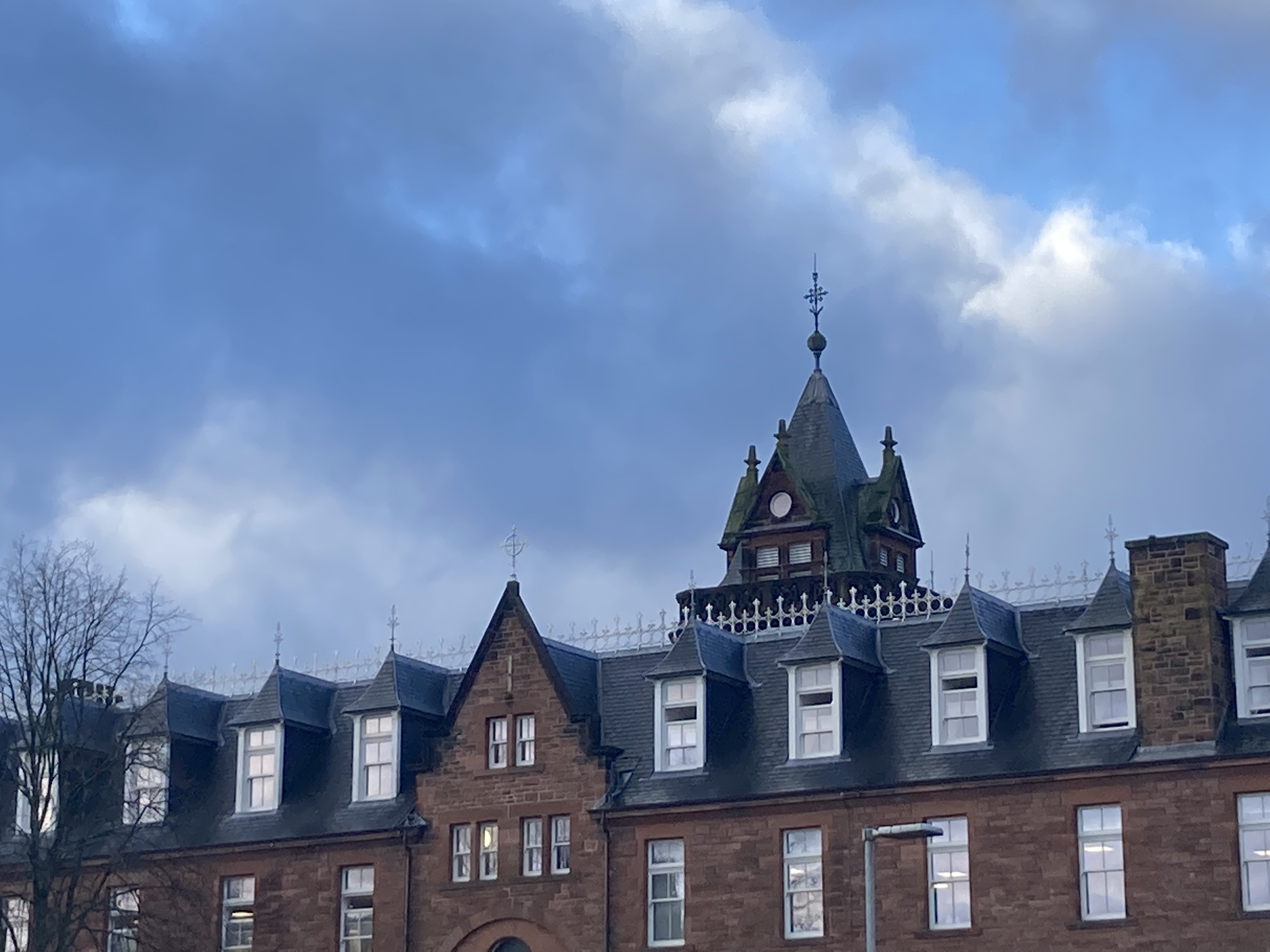
Picture of the main building

The school campus is made up of two buildings: The Ewan Duncan Building and the main school building housing the classrooms for all of the subjects (the gym hall and cafeteria being removed in the renovations). The grounds contain gardens and lawn at the front and back of the main building, and a playing field area roughly the size of three football fields and several hockey and tennis courts are also included.

== Linked schools ==
The college is linked with St Andrew's RC Primary School and St Teresa's RC Primary School, Dumfries.

== Notable former pupils ==
- Frank Brogan: footballer, Celtic F.C., Ipswich Town F.C.
- Jim Brogan: football player, Celtic F.C. and Scotland
- Charles Forte: founder of the Forte group of hotels
- Philip G. Fothergill: botanist
- Ian Harnett (1926–2001): footballer, Queen's Park F.C.
- John McDermott: artist and veteran affairs activist
- Allan McNish: racing driver born in Dumfries and three-time winner of Le Mans 24. He returned in recent years to talk at the annual awards ceremony.
- Frank Williams: founder and team principal of the Williams Formula One racing team
