= Heterotopy =

Evolutionary change in the spatial arrangement of an organism's embryonic development

Heterotopy is an evolutionary change in the spatial arrangement of an organism's embryonic development, complementary to heterochrony, a change to the rate or timing of a development process. It was first identified by Ernst Haeckel in 1866 and has remained less well studied than heterochrony.

== Concept ==
The concept of heterotopy, bringing evolution about by a change in the spatial arrangement of some process within the embryo, was introduced by the German zoologist Ernst Haeckel in 1866. He gave as an example a change in the positioning of the germ layer which created the gonads. Since then, heterotopy has been studied less than its companion, heterochrony which results in more readily observable phenomena like neoteny. With the arrival of evolutionary developmental biology in the late 20th century, heterotopy has been identified in changes in growth rate; in the distribution of proteins in the embryo; the creation of the vertebrate jaw; the repositioning of the mouth of nematode worms, and of the anus of irregular sea urchins. Heterotopy can create new morphologies in the embryo and hence in the adult, helping to explain how evolution shapes bodies.

In terms of evolutionary developmental biology, heterotopy means the positioning of a developmental process at any level in an embryo, whether at the level of the gene, a circuit of genes, a body structure, or an organ. It often involves homeosis, the evolutionary change of one organ into another. Heterotopy is achieved by the rewiring of an organism's genome, and can accordingly create rapid evolutionary change.

The evolutionary biologist Brian K. Hall argues that heterochrony offers such a simple and readily understood mechanism for reshaping bodies that heterotopy has likely often been overlooked. Since starting or stopping a process earlier or later, or changing its rate, can clearly cause a wide variety of changes in body shape and size (allometry), biologists have in Hall's view often invoked heterochrony to the exclusion of heterotopy.

== Heterotopy in botany ==
In botany examples of heterotopy include the transfer of bright flower pigments from ancestral petals to leaves that curl and form to mimic petals. In other cases experiments have yielded plants with mature leaves present on the highest shoots. Normal leaf development progresses from the base of the plant to the top: as the plant grows upwards it produces new leaves and lower leaves mature.

== Heterotopy in zoology ==
One textbook example of heterotopy in animals, a classic in genetics and developmental biology, is the experimental induction of legs in place of antennae in fruit flies, Drosophila. The name for this specific induction is 'antennapedia'. Surprisingly and elegantly, the transfer takes place in the experiment with no other strange pleiotropic consequences. The leg is transplanted and still is able to rotate on the turret-like complex on the fruit fly's head. The leg simply replaced the Antennae. Before this experiment it was thought that anatomical structures were somehow constrained into certain not well understood and undefined domains. Yet the relatively simple modification took place and caused a dramatic change in phenotype.

This further demonstrated that structures that were thought to be homologous at one time and were later modified still retained some modularity, or were interchangeable even millions of years after evolution had sent antennae down a separate path than the other appendages. This is due to the common origin of homeotic genes. Another well-known example is the environmentally induced heterotopic change seen in the melanin of the Himalayan rabbit and the Siamese cat and related breeds. In the Himalayan rabbit pigments in fur and skin are only expressed in the most distal portions, the very ends of limbs. This is similar to the case Siamese cats. In both the placement of fur pigmentation is induced by temperature. The regions furthest from core body heat and with the lowest circulation develop darker as an induced result. Individuals raised at a uniform external temperature above 30 °C do not express melanin in the extremities and as a result the fur on their paws is left white. The specific gene complex determined to be responsible is in the melanin expression series that is also responsible for albinism. This change is not heritable because it is a flexible or Plastic phenotypic change. The heterotopy demonstrated is that colder body regions are marked by expression of melanin.

The Himalayan rabbit and the Siamese cat are examples of artificial selection on heterotopy, developed by breeders incidentally long before the concept was understood. The current theory is that people selected for stereotypical phenotypic patterns (dark extremities) that happened to be repeatedly produced given a typical temperature. This is perhaps the only known example of convergent mechanisms in artificial selection. The common human breeding cultures that breed the rabbits and cats tended to themselves favor the pattern, in a way closely mimicking the way that the underlying genetics that form flexible adaptations can be selected for based on the phenotype they typically produce in an assumed environment in natural selection.

Another example may have happened in the early history of domesticating horses: tail-type hair grew instead of the wild-type short stiff hair still present in the manes of other equids such as donkeys and zebras.
