= Michael Claridge =

British entomologist

Michael Frederick Claridge FLS FRES FRSB (born 2 June 1934) is a British entomologist. He is Emeritus Professor of Entomology at Cardiff University. He received the Linnean Medal for Zoology in 2000 and was President of the Linnean Society 1988–1991.
