= Linnean Medal =

Award to biologist from scientific society

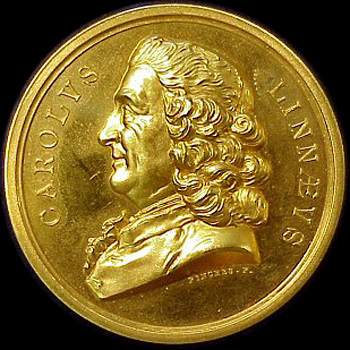
Linnean Medal. The awardee's name is shown on the reverse side.

The Linnean Medal of the Linnean Society of London was established in 1888 (137 years ago), and is awarded annually to alternately a botanist or a zoologist or (as has been common since 1958) to one of each in the same year. The medal was of gold until 1976, and is for the preceding years often referred to as "the Gold Medal of the Linnean Society", not to be confused with the official Linnean Gold Medal which is seldom awarded.

The engraver of the medal was Charles Anderson Ferrier of Dundee, a Fellow of the Linnean Society from 1882. On the obverse of the medal is the head of Linnaeus in profile and the words "Carolus Linnaeus", on the reverse are the arms of the society and the legend "Societas Linnaeana optime merenti"; an oval space is reserved for the recipient's name.

== Linnean medallists ==
=== 19th century ===
- 1888: Sir Joseph D. Hooker and Sir Richard Owen
- 1889: Alphonse Louis Pierre Pyrame de Candolle
- 1890: Thomas Henry Huxley
- 1891: Jean-Baptiste Édouard Bornet
- 1892: Alfred Russel Wallace
- 1893: Daniel Oliver
- 1894: Ernst Haeckel
- 1895: Ferdinand Julius Cohn
- 1896: George James Allman
- 1897: Jacob Georg Agardh
- 1898: George Charles Wallich
- 1899: John Gilbert Baker
- 1900: Alfred Newton

=== 20th century ===
- 1901: Sir George King
- 1902: Albert von Kölliker
- 1903: Mordecai Cubitt Cooke
- 1904: Albert C. L. G. Günther
- 1905: Eduard Strasburger
- 1906: Alfred Merle Norman
- 1907: Melchior Treub
- 1908: Thomas Roscoe Rede Stebbing
- 1909: Frederick Orpen Bower
- 1910: Georg Ossian Sars
- 1911: Hermann Graf zu Solms-Laubach
- 1912: Robert Cyril Layton Perkins
- 1913: Heinrich Gustav Adolf Engler
- 1914: Otto Butschli
- 1915: Joseph Henry Maiden
- 1916: Frank Evers Beddard
- 1917: Henry Brougham Guppy
- 1918: Frederick DuCane Godman
- 1919: Sir Isaac Bayley Balfour
- 1920: Sir Edwin Ray Lankester
- 1921: Dukinfield Henry Scott
- 1922: Sir Edward Bagnall Poulton
- 1923: Thomas Frederic Cheeseman
- 1924: William Carmichael McIntosh
- 1925: Francis Wall Oliver
- 1926: Edgar Johnson Allen
- 1927: Otto Stapf
- 1928: Edmund Beecher Wilson
- 1929: Hugo de Vries
- 1930: James Peter Hill
- 1931: Karl Ritter von Goebel
- 1932: Edwin Stephen Goodrich
- 1933: Robert Hippolyte Chodat
- 1934: Sir Sidney Frederic Harmer
- 1935: Sir David Prain
- 1936: John Stanley Gardiner
- 1937: Frederick Frost Blackman
- 1938: Sir D'Arcy Wentworth Thompson
- 1939: Elmer Drew Merrill
- 1940: Sir Arthur Smith Woodward
- 1941: Sir Arthur George Tansley
- 1942: Award suspended
- 1946: William Thomas Calman and Frederick Ernest Weiss
- 1947: Maurice Jules Gaston Corneille Caullery
- 1948: Agnes Arber
- 1949: D. M. S. Watson
- 1950: Henry Nicholas Ridley
- 1951: Theodor Mortensen
- 1952: Isaac Henry Burkill
- 1953: Patrick Alfred Buxton
- 1954: Felix Eugene Fritsch
- 1955: Sir John Graham Kerr
- 1956: William Henry Lang
- 1957: Erik Stensiö
- 1958: Sir Gavin de Beer and William Bertram Turrill
- 1959: H. M. Fox and Carl Skottsberg
- 1960: Libbie H. Hyman and Hugh Hamshaw Thomas
- 1961: Edmund W. Mason and F. S. Russle [sic]
- 1962: Norman L. Bor and Guillermo Kuschel
- 1963: Sidnie M. Manton and William H. Pearsall
- 1964: Richard E. Holttum and Carl Frederick Abel Pantin
- 1965: John Hutchinson and John Ramsbottom
- 1966: George Stuart Carter and Sir Harry Godwin
- 1967: Charles Sutherland Elton and Charles E. Hubbard
- 1968: A. Gragan and T. M. Harris
- 1969: Irene Manton and Ethelwynn Trewavas
- 1970: E. J. H. Corner and Errol I. White
- 1971: Charles Russell Metcalfe and James Edward Smith
- 1972: Arthur Roy Clapham and Alfred Romer
- 1973: G. Ledyard Stebbins and John.Z.Young
- 1974: E. H. W. Hennig and Josias Braun-Blanquet
- 1975: A. S. Watt and Philip M Sheppard
- 1976: William Thomas Stearn
- 1977: Ernst Mayr and Thomas G. Tutin
- 1978: Olav K. H. Hedberg and Thomas Stanley Westoll
- 1979: Robert McNeill Alexander and P. W. Richards
- 1980: Geoffrey Clough Ainsworth and Roy Crowson
- 1981: Brian Laurence Burtt and Sir Cyril Astley Clarke
- 1982: Peter Hadland Davis and Peter H. Greenwood
- 1983: Cecil T. Ingold and Michael J. D. White
- 1984: John G. Hawkes and J. S. Kennedy
- 1985: Arthur Cain and Jeffrey B. Harborne
- 1986: Arthur Cronquist and Percy C. C. Garnham
- 1987: Geoffrey Fryer and V. H. Heywood
- 1988: John L. Harley and Sir Richard Southwood
- 1989: William Donald Hamilton and Sir David Smith
- 1990: Sir Ghillean Tolmie Prance and F. Gwendolen Rees
- 1991: William Gilbert Chaloner and R. M. May
- 1992: Richard Evans Schultes and Stephen Jay Gould
- 1993: Barbara Pickersgill and Lincoln Brower
- 1994: F. E. Round and Sir Alec John Jeffreys
- 1995: S. M. Walters and John Maynard Smith
- 1996: Jack Heslop-Harrison and Keith Vickerman
- 1997: Enrico S. Coen and Rosemary Helen Lowe-McConnell
- 1998: Mark W. Chase and C. Patterson
- 1999: Philip Barry Tomlinson and Quentin Bone
- 2000: Bernard Verdcourt and Michael F. Claridge

=== 21st century ===
- 2001: Chris Humphries and Gareth J. Nelson
- 2002: Sherwin Carlquist and William J. Kennedy
- 2003: Pieter Baas and Bryan Campbell Clarke
- 2004: Geoffrey Allen Boxshall and John Dransfield
- 2005: Paula Rudall and Andrew Smith
- 2006: David Mabberley and Richard A. Fortey
- 2007: Phil Cribb and Thomas Cavalier-Smith
- 2008: Jeffrey Duckett and Stephen Donovan
- 2009: Peter Shaw Ashton and Michael Akam
- 2010: Dianne Edwards and Derek Yalden
- 2011: Brian J. Coppins and H. Charles Godfray
- 2012: Stephen Blackmore and Peter Holland
- 2013: Kingsley Wayne Dixon
- 2014: Niels Peder Kristensen and Hans Walter Lack
- 2015: Engkik Soepadmo, Claus Nielsen, and Rosmarie Honegger
- 2016: Sandra Knapp and Georgina Mace
- 2017: Charlie Jarvis and David Rollinson
- 2018: Kamaljit S Bawa, Jeremy Holloway, and Sophien Kamoun
- 2019: Vicki Funk and Samuel T. Turvey
- 2020: Ben Sheldon and Juliet Brodie
- 2021: Mary Jane West-Eberhard and Shahina Ghazanfar
- 2022: Rohan Pethiyagoda and Sebsebe Demissew
- 2023: Sandra Diaz
- 2024: Paul Upchurch
- 2025: David Macdonald

== See also ==
- List of biology awards
