= Rosemary Carpenter =

British plant geneticist

- Education: University of East Anglia
- Scientific career
- Workplaces: John Innes Centre
- Thesis: Studies on genetic instability in Antirrhinum majus (1998)

Rosemary Carpenter is a British plant geneticist known for her work on members of the genus Antirrhinum, commonly known as a snapdragon, for which she and Enrico Coen were awarded the 2004 Darwin Medal by the Royal Society.

== Career ==
Starting in the 1960, Carpenter worked with Brian Harrison at the John Innes Centre on unstable mutants of the snapdragon Antirrhinum. After meeting Carpenter during an interview at the John Innes Centre in 1983, Enrico Coen joined the center and they began a long collaboration with him using snapdragons as a model system to understand jumping genes and evolution. They applied a combination of molecular, genetic and morphological approaches to snapdragons with the goal of elucidating patterns in flower development using the hundreds of Antirrhihum mutants established by Carpenter. Carpenter retired in 2003.

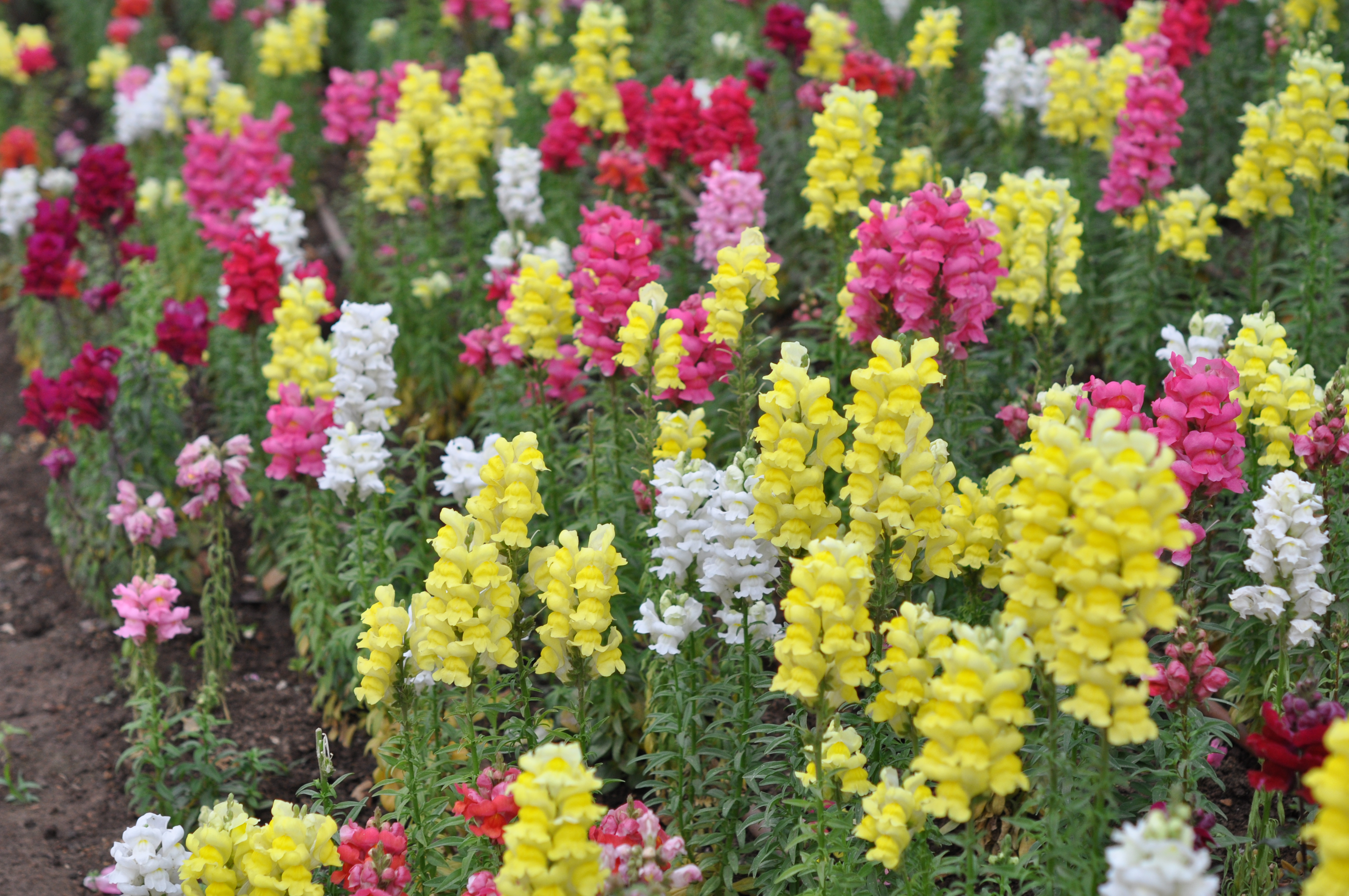
Carpenter is a plant geneticist who worked on Antirrhinum, snapdragons.

== Research ==
Carpenter is a plant geneticist known for her research on the population genetics of the snapdragon, Antirrhihum. Working with Brian Harrison in the 1970s, she defined genetic instabilities in Antirrhinum and the role of temperature in controlling the rate of instability of specific genes and transposable elements that occur in both maize and snapdragons. This was the first time a link between genetic instability and Antirrhihum was formalized, a milestone in research using snapdragons. The instability of genes in snapdragons begin Carpenter's collaboration with Enrico Coen, where they first worked on transposons and the effect of temperature on the excision of specific genes and how the transposable elements cause variability in gene expression. Carpenter, Coen, and their students isolated the genes controlling floral development. These genetic investigations allowed them to define the patterns of color, shape, and floral asymmetry in snapdragons and other plants. Carpenter's research on snapdragons includes investigations of how snapdragons select their colors using small RNA, which alter the selection of colors in the snapdragons.

=== Selected publications ===
- Carpenter, R; Coen, E S (1 September 1990). "Floral homeotic mutations produced by transposon-mutagenesis in Antirrhinum majus". Genes & Development. 4 (9): 1483–1493. doi:10.1101/gad.4.9.1483. ISSN 0890-9369. PMID 1979295.
- Coen, Enrico S.; Romero, JoséM.; Doyle, Sandra; Elliott, Robert; Murphy, George; Carpenter, Rosemary (1990). "floricaula: A homeotic gene required for flower development in antirrhinum majus". Cell. 63 (6): 1311–1322. doi:10.1016/0092-8674(90)90426-F. PMID 1702033. S2CID 46586130.
- Carpenter, R.; Coen, E.S. (1 January 1995). "Transposon induced chimeras show that floricaula, a meristem identity gene, acts non-autonomously between cell layers". Development. 121 (1): 19–26. doi:10.1242/dev.121.1.19. ISSN 0950-1991. PMID 7867500.
- Luo, Da; Carpenter, Rosemary; Vincent, Coral; Copsey, Lucy; Coen, Enrico (1996). "Origin of floral asymmetry in Antirrhinum". Nature. 383 (6603): 794–799. Bibcode:1996Natur.383..794L. doi:10.1038/383794a0. ISSN 0028-0836. PMID 8893002. S2CID 2188470.
- Bradley, Desmond; Carpenter, Rosemary; Copsey, Lucy; Vincent, Coral; Rothstein, Steven; Coen, Enrico (February 1996). "Control of inflorescence architecture in Antirrhinum". Nature. 379 (6568): 791–797. Bibcode:1996Natur.379..791B. doi:10.1038/379791a0. PMID 8587601. S2CID 998958.
