= Yolande Heslop-Harrison =

British botanist

- Born: Yolande Massey; 18 July 1919; Newcastle upon Tyne, UK
- Died: 23 July 2015 (aged 96)
- Scientific career
- Doctoral advisor: Kathleen Bever Blackburn

Yolande Heslop-Harrison is a British botanist known for her work on carnivorous plants, ecology, and plant reproduction including stigma morphology. She shared the 1982 Darwin Medal with her husband Jack Heslop-Harrison.

== Early life and education ==
She attended Central Newcastle High School for Girls. She did her undergraduate studies University of Durham and graduated with high honors in 1941. She earned her Ph.D. at King's College, Durham University (now Newcastle University). From 1971 until 1976 she was an honorary research fellow at Kew Gardens. and later a Leverhulme Trust Research Fellow at the Welsh Plant Breeding Station.

== Research ==
Heslop-Harrison is known for her work on plant physiology, especially insect-eating plants. She used electron microscopy to examine the structural forms of carnivorous plants and tracked radioactive material to track the movements of proteins through leaf structures. In 1996 Kew Gardens held a symposium to honor the work of both Jack and Yolande Heslop-Harrison and the proceedings were published in 1998.

== Selected publications ==
- Heslop-Harrison, J.; Heslop-Harrison, Y. (1970). "Evaluation of Pollen Viability by Enzymatically Induced Fluorescence; Intracellular Hydrolysis of Fluorescein Diacetate". Stain Technology. 45 (3): 115–120. doi:10.3109/10520297009085351. ISSN 0038-9153. PMID 4192549.
- HESLOP-HARRISON, YOLANDE; SHIVANNA, K. R. (1977-11-01). "The Receptive Surface of the Angiosperm Stigma". Annals of Botany. 41 (6): 1233–1258. doi:10.1093/oxfordjournals.aob.a085414. ISSN 0305-7364.
- Heslop-Harrison, Yolande (1970-01-09). "Scanning Electron Microscopy of Fresh Leaves of Pinguicula". Science. 167 (3915): 172–174. Bibcode:1970Sci...167..172H. doi:10.1126/science.167.3915.172. ISSN 0036-8075. PMID 17754133.
- HESLOP-HARRISON, YOLANDE (1977-09-01). "The Pollen-stigma Interaction: Pollen-tube Penetration in Crocus". Annals of Botany. 41 (5): 913–922. doi:10.1093/oxfordjournals.aob.a085387. ISSN 0305-7364.
- Heslop-Harrison, Yolande (1981). "Stigma characteristics and angiosperm taxonomy". Nordic Journal of Botany. 1 (3): 401–420. doi:10.1111/j.1756-1051.1981.tb00707.x. ISSN 1756-1051.
- Heslop-Harrison, Yolande (2000-03-01). "Control Gates and Micro-ecology: The Pollen-Stigma Interaction in Perspective". Annals of Botany. 85 (suppl_1): 5–13. Bibcode:2000AnBot..85....5H. doi:10.1006/anbo.1999.1063. ISSN 0305-7364. PMC 6126568.
- Heslop-Harrison, Yolande (2004). "Pinguicula L.". Journal of Ecology. 92 (6): 1071–1118. doi:10.1111/j.0022-0477.2004.00942.x.

== Awards and honors ==
In 1982 she shared the Darwin Medal with her husband, Jack Heslop-Harrison, for their work on "plant physiology including fundamental studies on insectivorous plants".

== Personal life ==
She met her future husband while they were undergraduate students, and they were married in 1950.
