= Enrico Coen =

British biologist (born 1957)

Rico Coen CBE FRS
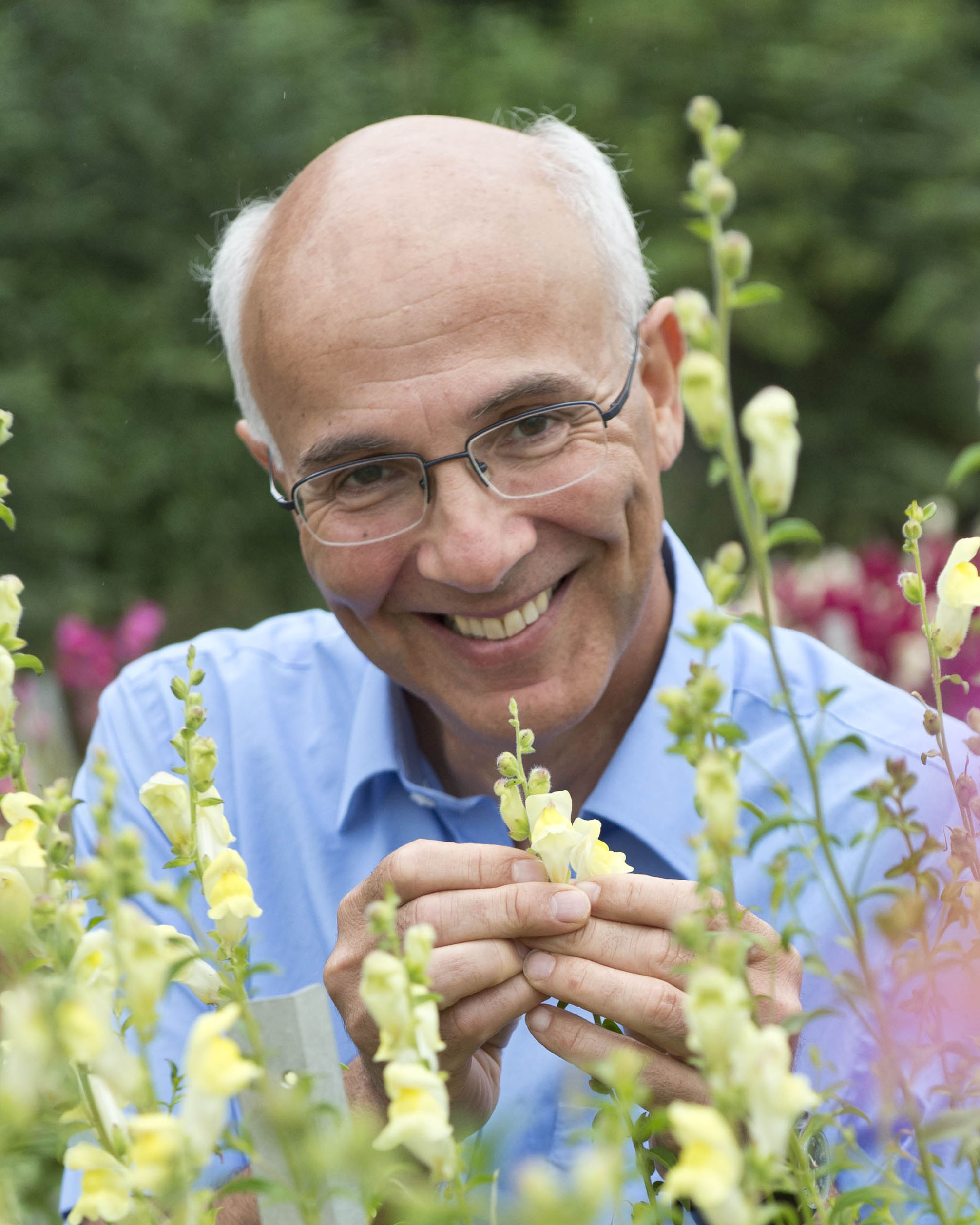
- Born: Enrico Sandro Coen; 29 September 1957 (age 68)
- Education: University of Cambridge (PhD)
- Awards: Foreign Associate of NAS (2001); EMBO Gold Medal (1996); Linnean Medal (1997); Darwin Medal (2004); Croonian Medal & Lecture (2016); Waddington Medal (2016)
- Scientific career
- Fields: Plant biology
- Workplaces: University of East Anglia; John Innes Centre
- Thesis: The dynamics of multigene family evolution in Drosophila (1982)
- Doctoral advisor: Gabriel Dover
- Website: rico-coen.jic.ac.uk

Enrico Sandro Coen CBE FRS (born 29 September 1957) is a British biologist who studies the mechanisms used by plants to create complex and varied flower structures. Coen's research has aimed to define the developmental rules that govern flower and leaf growth at both the cellular level and throughout the whole plant to better understand evolution. He has combined molecular, genetic and imaging studies with population and ecological models and computational analysis to understand flower development.

== Early life and education ==
Enrico Coen's father was a physicist and his mother was a chemist. Coen developed an interest in biology at age 15 after reading a biochemistry book entitled The Chemistry of Life. Drawn to abstract analysis, he was undecided whether to pursue chemistry or genetics, and ultimately decided for genetics because lectures began later and there was "coffee for exams".

After graduation from King's College, Cambridge in 1979 Coen stayed at Cambridge to pursue his doctoral degree. In 1982, he earned a PhD for research on Drosophila supervised by geneticist Gabriel Dover on the evolution and function of genes needed to make ribosomal RNA in fruit fly lines, which were selected for the number of bristles on their abdomen.

== Career ==
In 1982, Coen became a research fellow at St John's College, Cambridge. He decided to study the mechanism of supergenes, gene clusters acting together to affect both evolution and development. As one of the best-defined supergenes was in primroses, he wrote a proposal, and was accepted as a research fellow in the lab of plant biologist Dick Flavell at the Plant Breeding Institute in Cambridge.

After a year (1983/4) he sought a different plant system to continue his research at John Innes Centre in Norwich which studied Antirrhinum, commonly known as snapdragon, and was hired together with colleague Cathie Martin to join the lab of Brian Harrison and Rosemary Carpenter. Coen screened snapdragons for developmental mutants with sepals instead of petals and carpels instead of stamens, caused by transposon insertions. He eventually discovered that three classes of genes controlled whorl development in wild-type snapdragons: class A controlled sepal identity, class A and B petal identity, B and C stamen identity, and C alone carpel identity. In collaboration with Elliot Meyerowitz of the California Institute of Technology he created computer simulations of how plant cells and their genes interact to direct flower formation and control colour. In 1994 he published evidence of unity and logic of floral development across species on the molecular level as did the labs of Meyerowitz, of Zsuzsanna Schwarz-Sommer and Hans Sommer at Max Planck Institute in Cologne.

In the 1990s he collaborated with Przemysław Prusinkiewicz, a computer scientist knowledgeable in biological development at the University of Calgary and others computer modeling techniques to relate gene activity to patterns of growth and geometry.

== Work ==
Coen has written several books, including Cells to Civilizations: The Principles of Change That Shape Life, in which he postulates the seven ingredients which shape life: population variation, persistence, reinforcement, competition, co-operation, combinatorial richness and recurrence.

=== Awards and honours ===
- EMBO Gold Medal (1996)
- Linnean Medal (1997)
- In 1998 Coen was elected a Fellow of the Royal Society (FRS).
- Foreign Associate of NAS (2001)
- In 2003 he was appointed a CBE for services to plant genetics.
- In 2004 Coen won the Darwin Medal, with Rosemary Carpenter.
- In 2012 he became President of the Genetics Society, finishing his 3-year term in 2015.
- In 2016 he received the Croonian Medal & Lecture from The Royal Society and the Waddington Medal from the British Society for Developmental Biology
- Coen is a member of Faculty of 1000.
