= Gavin de Beer =

British evolutionary embryologist (1899–1972)

Sir Gavin de Beer
- Born: Gavin Rylands de Beer; 1 November 1899; Malden, Surrey, England
- Died: 21 June 1972 (aged 72); Alfriston, Sussex, England
- Known for: Heterochrony
- Awards: Linnean Medal (1958); Kalinga Prize (1968); Darwin Medal; Fellow of the Royal Society
- Scientific career
- Fields: Embryologist
- Workplaces: British Museum (Natural History)

Sir Gavin Rylands de Beer FRS (1 November 1899 – 21 June 1972) was a British evolutionary embryologist, known for his work on heterochrony as recorded in his 1930 book Embryos and Ancestors. He was director of the Natural History Museum, London, president of the Linnean Society of London, and a winner of the Royal Society's Darwin Medal for his studies on evolution.

== Biography ==
Born on 1 November 1899 in Malden, Surrey (now part of London), de Beer spent most of his childhood in France, where he was educated at the Parisian École Pascal. During this time, he also visited Switzerland, a country with which he remained fascinated for the rest of his life. His education continued at Harrow and Magdalen College, Oxford, where he graduated with a degree in zoology in 1921, after a pause to serve in the First World War in the Grenadier Guards and the Army Education Corps. In 1923 he was made a fellow of Merton College, Oxford, and began to teach at the university's zoology department. In 1938, he was made reader in embryology at University College, London.

During the Second World War, he again served with the Grenadier Guards reaching the rank of temporary lieutenant colonel. He worked in intelligence, propaganda and psychological warfare. In 1940, he was elected as a Fellow of the Royal Society.

In 1945, de Beer became professor of zoology and was, from 1946 to 1949, president of the Linnean Society. Then he was director of the British Museum (Natural History) (now the Natural History Museum), from 1950 until his retirement in 1960. He was knighted in 1954, and awarded the Darwin Medal of the Royal Society in 1957.

In 1958, he delivered the British Academy's Master-Mind Lecture, on Charles Darwin. In 1961 he gave the Royal Society of London's Wilkins Lecture.

After his retirement, de Beer moved to Switzerland and worked on several publications on Charles Darwin, including first publication of Darwin's manuscripts including his private notebooks, opening them to scholarship which became the "Darwin Industry". He also wrote his own seminal Atlas of Evolution and a series of books about Switzerland and the Alps. De Beer returned to England in 1971 and died at Alfriston, Sussex on 21 June 1972.

== Work ==
De Beer's early work at Oxford was influenced by J. B. S. Haldane and by Julian Huxley and E. S. Goodrich (two of his teachers). His early work was in experimental embryology; some of it was done in collaboration with Huxley, who would go on to be one of the leading figures of the modern synthesis. The Elements of experimental embryology, written with Huxley, was the best summary of the field at that time (1934).

In Embryos and Ancestors (1930) de Beer stressed the importance of heterochrony, and especially paedomorphosis in evolution. According to his theories, paedomorphosis (the retention of juvenile features in the adult form) is more important in evolution than gerontomorphosis, since juvenile tissues are relatively undifferentiated and capable of further evolution, whereas highly specialised tissues are less able to change. He also conceived the idea of clandestine evolution, which helped to explain the sudden changes in the fossil record which were apparently at odds with Darwin's gradualist theory of evolution. If a novelty were to evolve gradually in an animal's juvenile form, then its development would not appear in the fossil record at all, but if the species were then to undergo neoteny (a form of paedomorphosis in which sexual maturity is reached while in an otherwise juvenile form), then the feature would appear suddenly in the fossil record, despite having evolved gradually.

De Beer worked on paleornithology and general evolutionary theory, and was largely responsible for elucidating the concept of mosaic evolution, as illustrated by his review of Archaeopteryx in 1954. De Beer's also reviewed Haeckel's concept of heterochrony, with particular emphasis on its role in avian evolution, especially that of the ratites, in 1956. Dedicated to the popularisation of science, he received the Kalinga Prize from UNESCO.

De Beer was the first to propose the Col de la Traversette as the likely site where Hannibal had crossed the Alps with his elephants. His thesis received support in 2016 when Mahaney et al. reported that sediments had been identified at the pass that had been churned up by "the constant movement of thousands of animals and humans" and dated them to the time of Hannibal's invasion.

=== De Beer and the modern synthesis ===
The conventional view had been that developmental biology had little influence on the modern synthesis, but the following assessment suggests otherwise, at least as far as de Beer is concerned:

In a series of remarkable books that established the synthetic theory of evolution, Gavin de Beer's Embryology and evolution was the first and the shortest (1930; expanded and retitled Embryos and ancestors, 1940; 3rd ed 1958). In 116 pages de Beer brought embryology into the developing orthodoxy... for more than forty years, this book has dominated English thought on the relationship between ontogeny and phylogeny.

— Stephen Jay Gould,

== Collections ==
In 1973 the executors of de Beer's widow donated de Beer's papers to University College London. The archive includes notes and drafts for publications and lectures, correspondence, and financial and legal papers.

== Publications ==
- Comparative, Embryology And Evolution Of Chordate Animals (1922)
- Growth – 1924
- An introduction to experimental embryology – 1926
- The comparative anatomy, histology and development of the pituitary body – 1926
- Vertebrate Zoology – 1928
- Early travellers in the Alps – 1930
- Embryology and evolution – 1930 (later editions bore the title Embryos and ancestors)
- Alps and men. London, 1932
- The Elements of Experimental Embryology – 1934 (co-written with Julian Huxley)
- The development of the vertebrate skull – 1937
- Gavin de Beer (editor:) Evolution: Essays on aspects of evolutionary biology. Oxford 1938.
- Escape to Switzerland – 1945
- Sir Hans Sloane and the British Museum - 1953
- Archaeopteryx lithographica – 1954
- Alps and elephants. Hannibal's march – 1955
- The first ascent of Mont Blanc – 1957
- Darwin's journal: Darwin's notebooks on the transmutation of species. Vol. I. London: The British Museum. 1959.; Part II;
- The sciences were never at war – 1960
- Reflections of a Darwinian – 1962
- Charles Darwin: evolution by natural selection – 1963
- Atlas of Evolution – 1964
- Charles Scott Sherrington: an appreciation – 1966
- Early travellers in the Alps – 1967
- Edward Gibbon and his world – 1968
- Hannibal: Challenging Rome's Supremacy – 1969
- Streams of Culture. Philadelphia; New York: J. B. Lippincott Company. 1969 – via Internet Archive.
- Homology, an unsolved problem – 1971
- Jean-Jacques Rousseau and his world – 1972
