= Cresswell Shearer =

British zoologist (1874–1941)

- Born: 24 May 1874; Montreal, Quebec, Canada
- Died: 6 February 1941 (aged 66); Cambridge, England, U.K.
- Education: Johns Hopkins University, McGill University
- Family: Norma Shearer (actress)
- Awards: Fellow of the Royal Society
- Scientific career
- Workplaces: University of Cambridge, McGill University, Johns Hopkins University, Stazione Zoologica

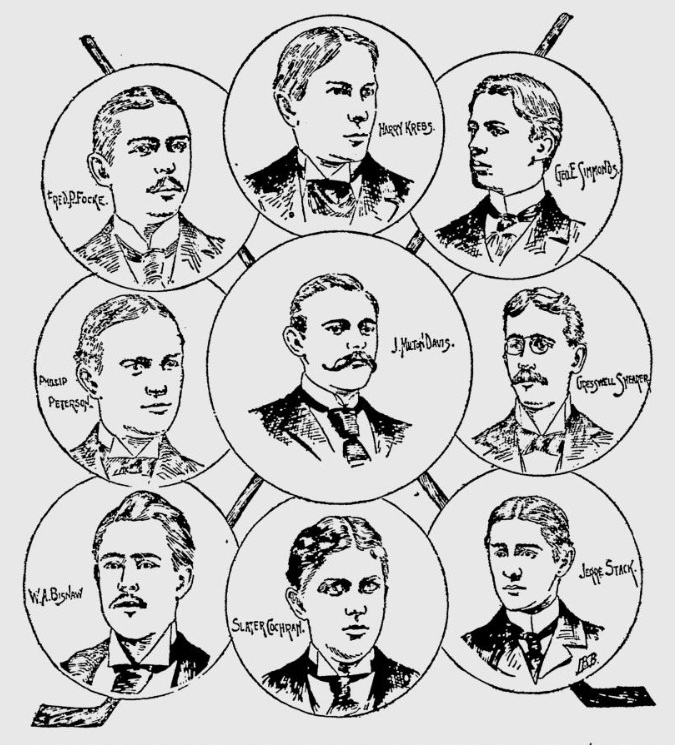
Shearer, at right in middle horizontal row, with Victoria Hockey Club (of Baltimore) in 1895–1896.

Cresswell Shearer, FRS (24 May 1874 – 6 February 1941), was a Canadian-British zoologist and University of Cambridge lecturer in experimental embryology.

At Cambridge, he motivated his students to develop a keen interest in hands-on research, inviting them to practical marine-research experience at the Plymouth Laboratory of the Marine Biological Association of the United Kingdom during the summer months. It is also where Shearer and Dorothy Jordan Lloyd worked as early pioneers on how to rear parthenogenetic sea-urchin larvae through metamorphosis. He also conducted research there with Harold Munro Fox and Walter de Morgan on the genetics of sea-urchin hybrids.

During World War I (1914–1918), Shearer returned to medicine, working at Davenport Military Hospital in Plymouth. Due to an outbreak of cerebrospinal fever amongst the troops, he improved cultivation methods to study meningococcus, a bacterium involved in some forms of meningitis and cerebrospinal infection.

He pursued lifelong interests in both photography and Italian architecture, publishing The Renaissance of Architecture in Southern Italy in 1935. Shearer's architectural photographs contribute to the Conway Library archive at London's Courtauld Institute of Art; the photograps which are being digitised as part of the Courtauld Connects project.

== Education ==
Initially taking courses in zoology and biology at Johns Hopkins University, in Baltimore, Maryland (U.S.), Shearer returned to Quebec to graduate with a medical degree from McGill University in 1901.

== Academic career ==
Shearer's career as a zoologist began in the biological laboratory at McGill the same year he graduated, working in close association with Ernest MacBride.

Between 1903 and 1909, he developed his interest in experimental embryology at Stazione Zoologica Anton Dohrn, a research institute in Naples, Italy.

He settled in Cambridge, lecturing in experimental embryology between 1910 and 1914. At the outbreak of World War I, Shearer was already in Plymouth so returned to medicine to help troops at Davenport military hospital. It was here he discovered importance of nasal secretion and vitamin supply to improve cultivation of meningococcus samples.

On his return to Cambridge at the end of the war, he transferred from the Zoology to the Department of Anatomy where embryology was a relatively new subject to lecture in. After his retirement from this post in 1937, he returned to the Zoology Department to conduct further research.

== Awards ==
Elected to the Harding Lectureship in 1912 (for the development of new aspects of biological science)

Elected Fellow of the Royal Society in 1916

== Family ==
Cresswell Shearer met his wife while working as a medic during World War I in Plymouth and had two sons.

Actress Norma Shearer was his niece.

== Published books ==
Shearer, Cresswell. The Renaissance of Architecture in Southern Italy; A Study of Frederick II of Hohenstaufen and the Capua Triumphator Archway and Towers. Heffers: Cambridge, 1935.

== Scientific papers ==
A list of principal publications can be found on the Royal Society website.

1898. On the nerve terminations in the selachian cornea. J. Comp. Neurol. 8, 217.

1901. On the significance of certain phases in the life history of the malarial parasites. Montreal Med. J.

1903. (With Prof. Murbach.) On medusae from the coast of British Columbia and Alaska. Proc. Zool. Soc. Lond. 164.

1906. On the existence of cell communications between blastomeres. Proc. Roy. Soc. B, 77, 498. ------ Studies on the development of larval nephridia. Part I. Phoronis. M itt. Zool. Sta. Neapl, 17, 487. ------ On the structure of the nephridia of Dinophilus. Quart. J. Micr. Sci. 50, 517.

1907. Studies on the development of larval nephridia. Part II. Polygordius. Phil. Trans. B y199, 199.

1910. On the anatomy of Histriohdella homari. Quart, jf. Micr. Sci. 55, 287.

1911. On the development and structure of the trochophore of Hydroides uncinatus (Eupomatus). Quart. J. Micr. Sci. 56, 543. 1912. The problem of sex-determination in Dinophilus gyrociliatus. Part I. The sexual cycle. Quart. J. Micr. Sci. 57, 329.

1913. (With D. J. Lloyd.) On methods of producing artificial parthenogenesis in Echinus esculentus and the rearing of the parthenogenetic plutei through metamorphosis. Quart. J. Micr. Sci. 58, 523. 1914. (With de Morgan and H. M. Fuchs.) On the experimental hybridization of echinoids. Phil. Trans. B, 204, 255.

1917. On the toxic action of dilute pure sodium chloride solutions on the meningococcus. Proc. Roy. Soc. B, 89, 440. ------ On the presence of an accessory food factor in the nasal secretion. 13 Jan., p. 59. ------ (With H. W. Crowe.) The role of the phagocyte in cerebro-spinal meningitis. Proc. Roy. Soc. B, 89, 422.

1919. On the action of electrolytes on the conductivity of bacterial emulsions. Contributions to medical and biological research dedicated to Sir William Osier, p. 250. ------Studies on the action of electrolytes on bacteria. Part I. The action of monovalent and divalent salts on the conductivity of bacterial emulsions. J. Hyg. Camb. 18, 337.

1920. (With T. R. Parsons.) The acid-base equilibrium in the cerebro-spinal fluid. J.Physiol. 54, 62.

1921. Amount of heat liberated by B. coli when grown in the presence of free aminoacids. J. Physiol. 55, 50.

1922. On the oxidation processes of the echinoderm egg during fertilization. Proc. Roy. Soc. By 93, 213. ------ Studies on the action of electrolytes on bacteria. Part II. The influence of the trivalent positive salts on the rate of migration of bacteria in an electric field, and their effect on growth and virulence of pathogenic organisms, y. Hyg. Camb. 21, 77.

1924. On the heat production and oxidation processes of the echinoderm egg during fertilization and early development. Proc. Roy. Soc. B, 93, 410. ------ On the oxygen consumption rate of parts of the chick embryo and fragments of the earthworm. Proc. Roy. Soc. B, 96, 146.

1930. A re-investigation of metabolic gradients, y. Exp. Biol. 7, 260
