= William Andrew Clark =

Scottish botanist

Dr William Andrew Clark FRSE (1911-1983) was a Scottish botanist known for collections largely in the Outer Hebrides. He was an expert on spermatophytes and the flora of north-east England.

== Life ==
He was born in Girvan in Ayrshire the son of Thomas Clark. He attended Alva Academy 1916-1923 and then Harris Academy in Dundee 1923–1929.

He attended St Andrews University gaining a BSc in 1932 and a PhD in 1936. He lectured in Botany firstly at Liverpool University then at Newcastle University until retiring in 1976. He was elected a Fellow of the Royal Society of Edinburgh in 1957.

He died in Ryton, Tyne and Wear on 19 November 1983.

== Family ==
He married Helena Heslop-Harrison, daughter of John William Heslop-Harrison FRSE in 1941.
