= Frederick Orpen Bower =

English botanist (1855–1948)

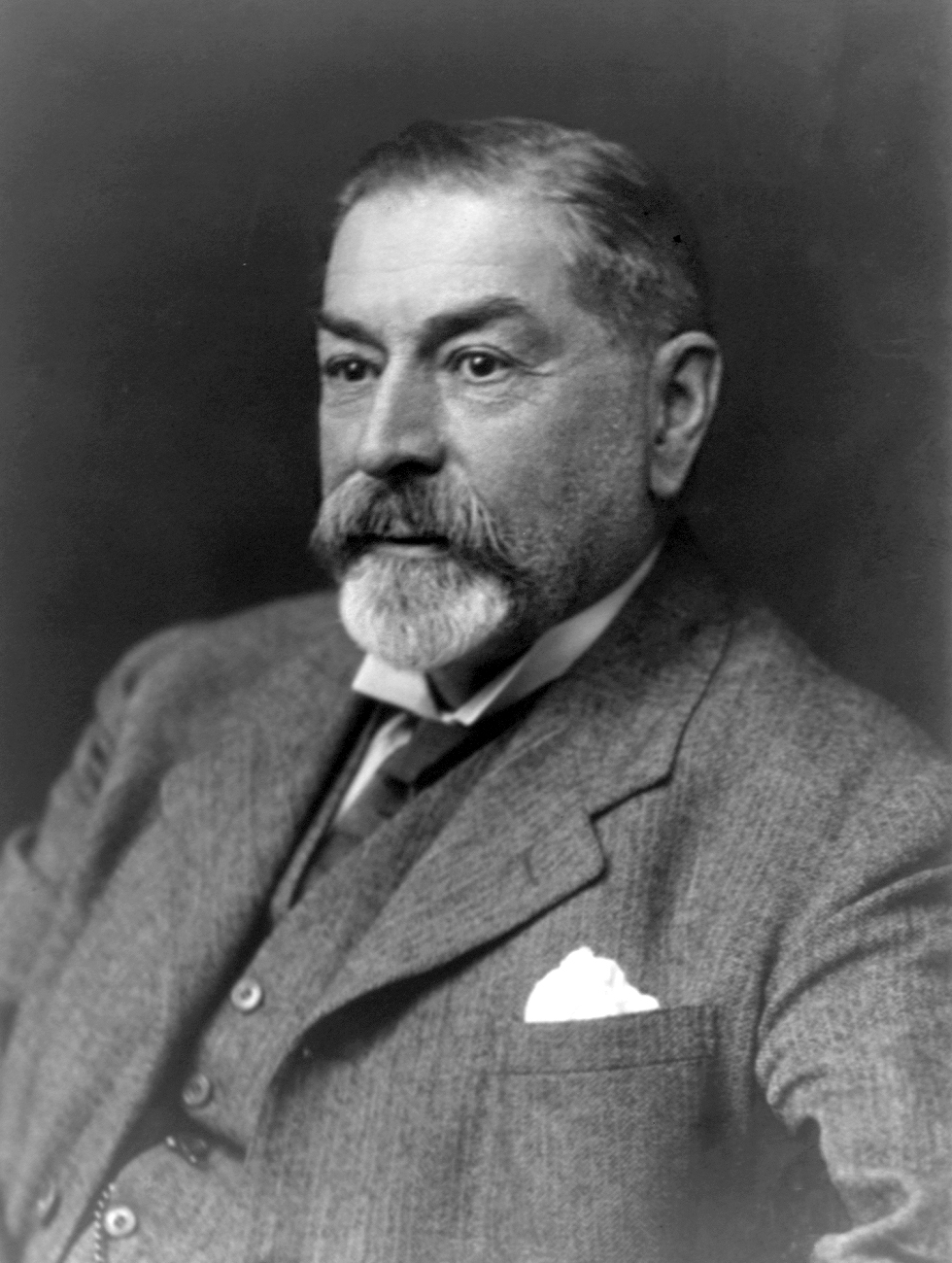
- Born: 4 November 1855
- Died: 11 April 1948 (aged 92)
- Awards: Linnean Medal (1909); Royal Medal (1910); Darwin Medal; Fellow of the Royal Society
- Scientific career
- Fields: botany
- Author abbrev. (botany): Bower

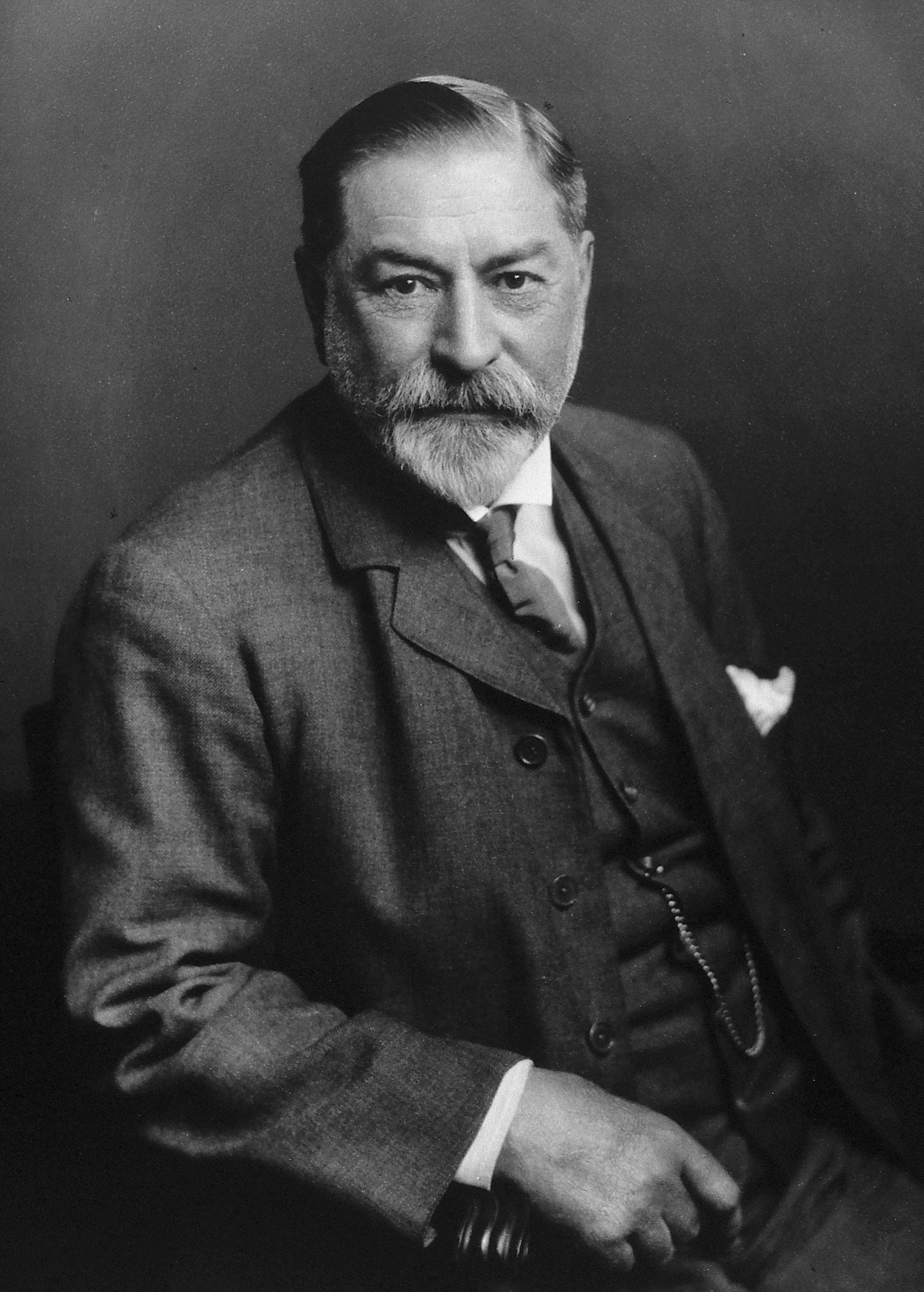
Frederick Orpen Bower in 1924

Frederick Orpen Bower FRSE FRS (4 November 1855 – 11 April 1948) was an English botanist. He was elected a Fellow of the Royal Society in 1891. He was awarded the Gold Medal of the Linnean Society in 1909 and the Darwin Medal of the Royal Society in 1938. He was president of the British Association in 1929–1930.

== Life ==
Bower was born in Ripon in Yorkshire the son of Abraham Bower and Cornelia Morris, sister of the eminent botanist, Francis Orpen Morris. He was educated at Repton School in Derbyshire before studying at Trinity College, Cambridge, where he graduated MA in 1877.

In 1880, he acquired a position as assistant lecturer in botany at University College, London under Thomas Huxley. In 1882, he moved to South Kensington as a full Lecturer in botany. During this period he spent time at Kew Gardens studying with Dukinfield Henry Scott. In 1885, he was awarded the chair in botany at the University of Glasgow, and was a professor there until 1925.

Bower never married. When he retired he returned to Ripon, and died there in April 1948.

== Memberships ==
- Fellow of the Royal Society of Edinburgh (1886)
- Fellow of the Royal Society (1891)
- Fellow of the Royal Society of Belgium
- Fellow of the Academy of Science of Munich
- Fellow of the Royal Danish Society

== Honours and awards ==
- He was elected president of the Botanical Society of Edinburgh for 1893–95.
- He served as vice president of the Royal Society of Edinburgh 1910 to 1916 and president from 1919 to 1924, receiving the Neill Prize in 1925.

== Publications ==
- Practical Botany for Beginners (1894)
- The Origin of a Land Flora (1908)
- Plant Life of Land (1911)
- The Ferns 3 vols. (1923–28)
- Plants and Man (1925)
- Size and Form in Plants (1930)
- Primitive Land Plants (1935)
- Sixty Years of Botany in Britain, 1875-1935 (1938)

== Archives ==
The archives for Frederick Orpen Bower are maintained by the Archives of the University of Glasgow (GUAS).
