= Edward James Salisbury =

English botanist and ecologist

Sir Edward James Salisbury FRS CBE DSc
- Born: 16 April 1886; Limbrick Hall, Harpenden, Hertfordshire, England
- Died: 10 November 1978 (aged 92); Felpham, West Sussex, England
- Education: University College School, University College London
- Occupations: Ecologist, botanist
- Employer(s): East London College, University College London
- Spouse: Mabel Elwin-Coles (1917–1956)
- Parent(s): James Wright Salisbury (businessman); Elizabeth Salisbury née Stimpson
- Relatives: Frank O. Salisbury (cousin)
- Awards: Veitch Memorial Medal (1935); Royal Medal (1945); VMH (1953)
- Scientific career
- Author abbrev. (botany): E.Salisb.

Sir Edward James Salisbury CBE FRS (16 April 1886 – 10 November 1978) was an English botanist and ecologist. He was born in Harpenden, Hertfordshire and graduated in botany from University College London in 1905. In 1913, he obtained a D.Sc. with a thesis on fossil seeds and was appointed a senior lecturer at East London College. He returned to University College London as a senior lecturer, from 1924 as a reader in plant ecology and from 1929 as Quain Professor of botany.

Salisbury was director of the Royal Botanic Gardens, Kew from 1943 to 1956. He was responsible for the restoration of the gardens after the Second World War.

He was elected a Fellow of the Royal Society on 15 March 1933 and won the society's Royal Medal in 1945 for "his notable contributions to plant ecology and to the study of the British flora generally". In 1936, he was awarded The Veitch Memorial Medal of the Royal Horticultural Society in acknowledgement of his book The Living Garden (1935), which was enormously popular. In 1939, he received the Commander of the Order of the British Empire and in 1946 he was knighted.

At first, his research was focussed on forest ecology, particularly in his native Hertfordshire. Later, he pioneered investigations of seed size and reproductive output of plants in relation to habitat. He also investigated the ecology of garden weeds and of dune plants.

He was elected President of the Sussex Wildlife Trust in January 1962, where he remained in office until April 1967.

== Popular science books ==
- The Living Garden. 1936
- Flowers of the Woods. 1946

== Scientific books ==
- Durand, Théophile; Benjamin Daydon Jackson; William Turner Thiselton-Dyer; David Prain; Arthur William Hill; Edward James Salisbury (1908). Index Kewensis plantarum phanerogamarum: Supplementum Tertium Nomina et Synonyma Omnium Generum et Specierum AB Initio Anni MDCCCCI Usque AD Finem Anni MDCCCCV Complectens. Royal Botanic Gardens, Kew.
- Salisbury, E.J. (1935). The Living garden, or the how and why of garden life. London: George Bell & Sons. Unknown ID: N000193912.
- Salisbury, E.J. (1942). The Reproductive Capacity of Plants. London: George Bell & Sons.
- Salisbury, E.J. (1952). Downs and Dunes: their plant life and its environment. London: George Bell & Sons.
- Salisbury, E.J. (1961). Weeds and Aliens. The New Naturalists. Vol. 43. London: Collins.
- Salisbury, E.J. (1962). The Biology of Garden Weeds. The Royal Horticultural Society.

== Selected scientific papers ==
- Salisbury, E.J. (1916) The emergence of the aerial organs in woodland plants. Journal of Ecology 4 (3–4): 121–128.
- Salisbury, E.J. (1920) The significance of the calcicolous habit. Journal of Ecology 8 (1): 202–215.
- Salisbury, E.J. (1922) Stratification and Hydrogen-ion concentration of the soil in relation to leaching and plant succession with special reference to woodlands. Journal of Ecology 9 (2): 220–240.
- Salisbury, E.J. (1925) The incidence of species in relation to soil reaction. Journal of Ecology 13 (1): 149–160.
- Salisbury, E.J. (1925) Note on the edaphic succession in some dune soils with special reference to the time factor. Journal of Ecology 13 (2): 322–328.
- Salisbury, E.J. (1925) Note on the edaphic succession in some dune soils with special reference to the time factor. Journal of Ecology 13 (2): 322–328.
- Salisbury, E.J. (1926) The geographical distribution of plants in relation to climatic factors. The Geographical Journal 67 (4): 312–335. Discussion on pp. 335–342 by H.N. Ridley a.o.
- Salisbury, E.J. (1927) On the causes and ecological significance of stomatal frequency with special reference to woodland flora. Philosophical Transactions of the Royal Society of London, series B 216 (1928): 1–65.
- Salisbury, E.J. (1929) The biological equipment of species in relation to competition. Journal of Ecology 17 (2): 197–222.
- Salisbury, E.J. (1930) Mortality amongst plants and its bearing on natural selection. Nature 125 : 817. Commented by Ronald A. Fisher (1930) in Nature 125: 972–973.; Reply by Salisbury in Nature 126: 95–96.
- Salisbury, E.J. (1971) The pioneer vegetation of exposed muds and its biological features. Philosophical Transactions of the Royal Society of London, Series B: Biological Sciences 259 : 207–255.
- Salisbury, E. (1974) Seed size and mass in relation to environment. Proceedings of the Royal Society of London Series B: Biological Sciences 186 (1083): 83–88.
- Salisbury, E. (1975) The survival value of modes of dispersal. Proceedings of the Royal Society of London Series B: Biological Sciences 188 (1091): 183–188.
- Salisbury, E. (1976) Seed output and the efficacy of dispersal by wind. Proceedings of the Royal Society of London Series B: Biological Sciences 192 (1108): 323–329.

Academic offices
| Preceded by James Gray | Fullerian Professor of Physiology; 1947–1953 | Succeeded by Harold Munro Fox |
