= John McDermott (Scottish artist) =

- Born: Blantyre, Glasgow, UK
- Education: Glasgow School of Art
- Spouse: Anna McDermott
- Website: Official website

John McDermott (born 1957 in Blantyre near Glasgow) is a Scottish artist and veteran affairs activist. He is known for large abstract paintings and public art works. McDermott is the founder of Aftermath PTSD and Art For Heroes, a veterans art organisation.

McDermott was born and raised in Glasgow, and attended St Joseph's College, Dumfries. Later, he was admitted to Glasgow School of Art. McDermott studied in Art, Classics, Rise of Science & Technology, Modern history from the Open University.

== Career ==
McDermott started his career with the Royal Navy in 1972. According to him, during his tenure from 1972 to 2000, he traveled significantly around the world and experiencing military conflict and the self-destructive nature of mankind which often feature prominently in his arts. He was also a UN Military Observer serving in Cambodia, and West Africa. During this period, he met the late John Craxton RA who greatly influenced his art works.

In 2000, he was appointed as the Head of Security at the Old Bailey, London where he was drawn towards existential paintings. This led to a sell-out exhibition on the Falklands Islands to raise funds for the Veterans Refuge on the Islands. Later, in 2008, he moved to Exeter, Devon and started working full-time as an artist.

In 2009, he founded Aftermath PTSD to assist conflict trauma sufferers with existential arts and had 4 major exhibitions with national media coverage. From 2014 to 2016, he was invited by the Norwegian Art Therapists Association and the Norwegian Veterans Artist Programme for workshops. McDermott continues to paint and conduct art shops at Exeter Visual Arts (EVA).

== Select exhibitions ==
- 2015: Agalaus Art Festival - Voss, Norway
- 2013: Exeter Spring Festival - Exeter Castle at the request of Exeter City Council
- 2013: Aftermath PTSD 'Once were Warriors' Exhibition - Royal Albert Memorial Museum (RAMM), Exeter
