= Heterochrony =

Evolutionary change in the timing of an organism's development

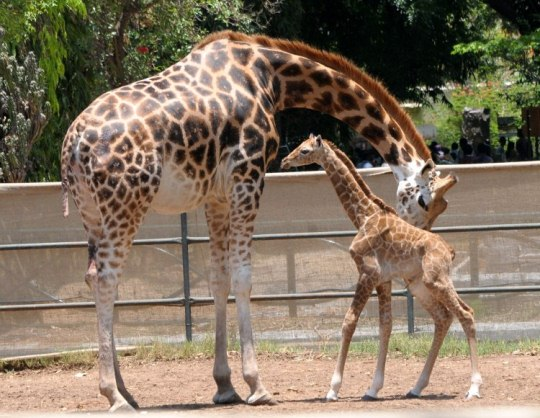
Giraffes acquired their long necks through heterochrony, extending the development period of the seven neck vertebrae's growth in the embryo to add length to the bones, not by adding more bones.

In evolutionary developmental biology, heterochrony is any genetically controlled difference in the timing, rate, or duration of a developmental process in an organism compared to its ancestors or other organisms. This leads to changes in the size, shape, characteristics and even presence of certain organs and features. It is contrasted with heterotopy, a change in spatial positioning of some process in the embryo, which can also create morphological innovation. Heterochrony can be divided into intraspecific heterochrony, variation within a species, and interspecific heterochrony, phylogenetic variation, i.e. variation of a descendant species with respect to an ancestral species.

These changes all affect the start, end, rate or time span of a particular developmental process. The concept of heterochrony was introduced by Ernst Haeckel in 1875 and given its modern sense by Gavin de Beer in 1930.

== History ==
Ernst Haeckel supposed that embryonic development recapitulated an animal's phylogeny, and introduced heterochrony as an exception for individual organs. Modern biology agrees instead with Karl Ernst von Baer's view that development itself varies, such as by changing the timing of different processes, to cause a branching phylogeny.

The concept of heterochrony was introduced by the German zoologist Ernst Haeckel in 1875, where he used it to define deviations from recapitulation theory, which held that "ontogeny recapitulates phylogeny". As Stephen Jay Gould pointed out, Haeckel's term is now used in a sense contrary to his coinage; Haeckel had assumed that embryonic development (ontogeny) of "higher" animals recapitulated their ancestral development (phylogeny), as when mammal embryos have structures on the neck that resemble fish gills at one stage. This, in his view, necessarily compressed the earlier developmental stages, representing the ancestors, into a shorter time, meaning accelerated development. The ideal for Haeckel would be when the development of every part of an organism was thus accelerated, but he recognised that some organs could develop with displacements in position (heterotopy, another concept he originated) or time (heterochrony), as exceptions to his rule. He thus intended the term to mean a change in the timing of the embryonic development of one organ with respect to the rest of the same animal, whereas it is now used, following the work of the British evolutionary embryologist Gavin de Beer in 1930, to mean a change with respect to the development of the same organ in the animal's ancestors.

In 1928, the English embryologist Walter Garstang showed that tunicate larvae shared structures such as the notochord with adult vertebrates, and suggested that the vertebrates arose by paedomorphosis (neoteny) from such a larva. The proposal implied (if it were correct) a shared phylogeny of tunicates and vertebrates, and that heterochrony was a principal mechanism of evolutionary change.

Modern evolutionary developmental biology (evo-devo) studies the molecular genetics of development. It seeks to explain each step in the creation of an adult organism from an undifferentiated zygote in terms of the control of expression of one gene after another. Further, it relates such patterns of control of development to phylogeny. De Beer to some extent anticipated such late 20th-century science in his 1930 book Embryos and Ancestors, showing that evolution could occur by heterochrony, such as in paedomorphosis, the retention of juvenile features in the adult. De Beer argued that this enabled rapid evolutionary change, too brief to be recorded in the fossil record, and in effect explaining why apparent gaps were likely.

== Mechanisms ==
Diagram of the six types of shift in heterochrony, a change in the timing or rate of any process in embryonic development. Predisplacement, hypermorphosis, and acceleration extend development (peramorphosis, in red); postdisplacement, hypomorphosis, and deceleration all truncate it (paedomorphosis, in blue). These may be combined, e.g. to shift some aspect of development earlier.

Heterochrony can be divided into intraspecific and interspecific types.

Intraspecific heterochrony means changes in the rate or timing of development within a species. For example, some individuals of the salamander species Ambystoma talpoideum delay the metamorphosis of the skull. Reilly and colleagues argue we can define these variant individuals as paedotypic (with truncated development relative to the ancestral condition), peratypic (with extended development relative to the ancestral condition), or isotypic (reaching the same ancestral shape, but via a different mechanism).

Interspecific heterochrony means differences in the rate or timing of a descendant species relative to its ancestor. This can result in either paedomorphosis (truncating the ancestral ontogeny), peramorphosis (extending past the ancestral ontogeny), or isomorphosis (reaching the same ancestral state via a different mechanism).

There are three major mechanisms of heterochrony, each of which can change in either of two directions, giving six types of perturbations, which can be combined in various ways. These ultimately result in extended, shifted, or truncated development of a particular process, such as the action of a single toolkit gene, relative to the ancestral condition or to other conspecifics, depending on whether inter- or intraspecific heterochrony is the focus. Identifying which of the six perturbations is occurring is critical in identifying the actual underlying mechanism driving peramorphosis or paedomorphosis.

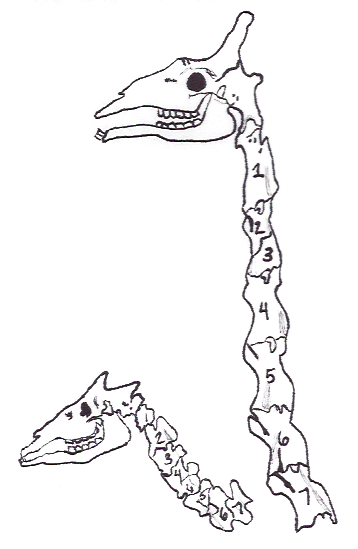
Despite greatly differing neck lengths, giraffes (right) have no more cervical vertebrae, just 7, than their fellow giraffids, okapi (left). With the number constrained, the development of the vertebrae is extended, allowing them to grow longer.

- Onset: A developmental process can either begin earlier, pre-displacement, extending its development, or later, post-displacement, truncating it.
- Offset: A process can either end later, hypermorphosis, extending its development, or earlier, hypomorphosis or progenesis, truncating it.
- Rate: The rate of a process can accelerate, extending its development, or decelerate (as in neoteny), truncating it.

A dramatic illustration of how acceleration can change a body plan is seen in snakes. Where a typical vertebrate like a mouse has only around 60 vertebrae, snakes have between around 150 to 400, giving them extremely long spinal columns and enabling their sinuous locomotion. Snake embryos achieve this by accelerating their system for creating somites (body segments), which relies on an oscillator. The oscillator clock runs some four times faster in snake than in mouse embryos, initially creating very thin somites. These expand to adopt a typical vertebrate shape, elongating the body.

Giraffes gain their long necks by a different heterochrony, extending the development of their cervical vertebrae; they retain the usual mammalian number of these vertebrae, seven. This number appears to be constrained by the use of neck somites to form the mammalian diaphragm muscle; the result is that the embryonic neck is divided into three modules, the middle one (C3 to C5) serving the diaphragm. The assumption is that disrupting this would kill the embryo rather than giving it more vertebrae.

== Detection ==
Heterochrony can be identified by comparing phylogenetically close species, for example a group of different bird species whose legs differ in their average length. These comparisons are complex because there are no universal ontogenetic timemarkers. The method of event pairing attempts to overcome this by comparing the relative timing of two events at a time. This method detects event heterochronies, as opposed to allometric changes. It is cumbersome to use because the number of event pair characters increases with the square of the number of events compared. Event pairing can however be automated, for instance with the PARSIMOV script. A recent method, continuous analysis, rests on a simple standardization of ontogenetic time or sequences, on squared change parsimony and phylogenetic independent contrasts.

== Effects ==
=== Paedomorphosis ===
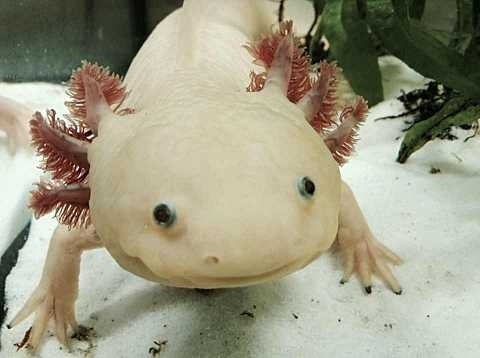
Axolotls retain gills and fins as adults; these are juvenile features in most amphibians.

Paedomorphosis can be the result of neoteny, the retention of juvenile traits into the adult form as a result of retardation of somatic development, or of progenesis, the acceleration of developmental processes such that the juvenile form becomes a sexually mature adult. This means that in progenesis, germ cell growth is accelerated relative to normal or in neoteny; while somatic cell growth is normal in progenesis, but retarded in neoteny.

Neoteny retards the development of the organism into an adult, and has been described as "eternal childhood". In this form of heterochrony, the developmental stage of childhood is itself extended, and certain developmental processes that normally take place only during childhood (such as accelerated brain growth in humans), is also extended throughout this period. Neoteny has been implicated as a developmental cause for a number of behavior changes, as a result of increased brain plasticity and extended childhood.

Progenesis (or paedogenesis) can be observed in the axolotl (Ambystoma mexicanum). Axolotls reach full sexual maturity while retaining their fins and gills (in other words, still in the juvenile form of their ancestors). They will remain in aquatic environments in this truncated developmental form, rather than moving onto land as other sexually mature salamander species. This is thought to be a form of hypomorphosis (earlier ending of development) that is both hormonally and genetically driven. The entire metamorphosis that would allow the salamander to transition into the adult form is essentially blocked by both of these drivers.

Paedomorphosis by progenesis may play a critical role in avian cranial evolution. The skulls and beaks of living, adult birds retain the anatomy of the juvenile theropod dinosaurs from which they evolved. Extant birds have large eyes and brains relative to the rest of the skull; a condition seen in adult birds that represents (broadly speaking) the juvenile stage of a dinosaur. A juvenile avian ancestor (as typified by Coelophysis) would have a short face, large eyes, a thin palate, narrow jugal bone, tall and thin postorbitals, restricted adductors, and a short and bulbous braincase. As an organism such as this aged, they would change greatly in their cranial morphology to develop a robust skull with larger, overlapping bones. Birds, however, retain this juvenile morphology. Evidence from molecular experiments suggests both fibroblast growth factor 8 (FGF8) and members of the WNT signalling pathway have facilitated paedomorphosis in birds. These signalling pathways are known to play roles in facial patterning in other vertebrate species. This retention of the juvenile ancestral state has driven other changes in the anatomy that result in a light, highly kinetic (moveable) skull composed of many small, non-overlapping bones. This is believed to have facilitated the evolution of cranial kinesis in birds which has played a critical role in their ecological success.

=== Peramorphosis ===
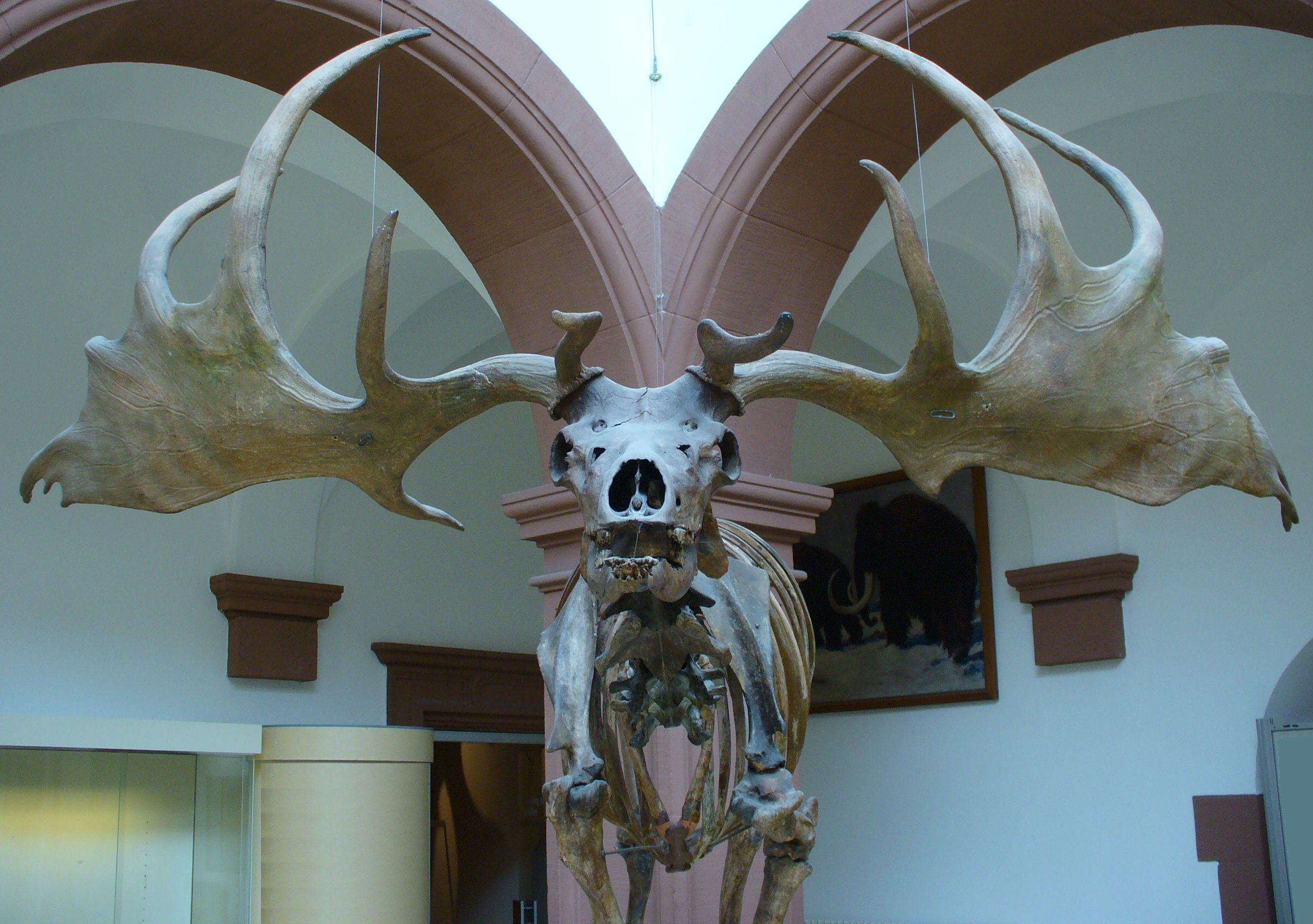
Irish elk skeleton with antlers spanning 2.7 metres (8.9 ft) and a mass of 40 kg (88 lb)

Peramorphosis is delayed maturation with extended periods of growth. An example is the extinct Irish elk. From the fossil record, its antlers spanned up to 12 feet (3.7 m) wide, which is about a third larger than the antlers of its close relative, the moose. The Irish elk had larger antlers due to extended development during their period of growth.

Another example of peramorphosis is seen in insular (island) rodents. Their characteristics include gigantism, wider cheek and teeth, reduced litter size, and longer lifespan. Their relatives that inhabit continental environments are much smaller. Insular rodents have evolved these features to accommodate the abundance of food and resources they have on their islands. These factors are part of a complex phenomenon termed Island syndrome or Foster's rule.

The mole salamander, a close relative to the axolotl, displays both paedomorphosis and peramorphosis. The larva can develop in either direction. Population density, food, and the amount of water may have an effect on the expression of heterochrony. A study conducted on the mole salamander in 1987 found it evident that a higher percentage of individuals became paedomorphic when there was a low larval population density in a constant water level as opposed to a high larval population density in drying water. This had an implication that led to hypotheses that selective pressures imposed by the environment, such as predation and loss of resources, were instrumental to the cause of these trends. These ideas were reinforced by other studies, such as peramorphosis in the Puerto Rican tree frog. Another reason could be generation time, or the lifespan of the species in question. When a species has a relatively short lifespan, natural selection favors evolution of paedomorphosis (e.g. Axolotl: 7–10 years). Conversely, in long lifespans natural selection favors evolution of peramorphosis (e.g. Irish Elk: 20–22 years).

=== Across the animal kingdom ===
Heterochrony is responsible for a wide variety of effects such as the lengthening of the fingers by adding extra phalanges in dolphins to form their flippers, sexual dimorphism, and the polymorphism seen between insect castes.

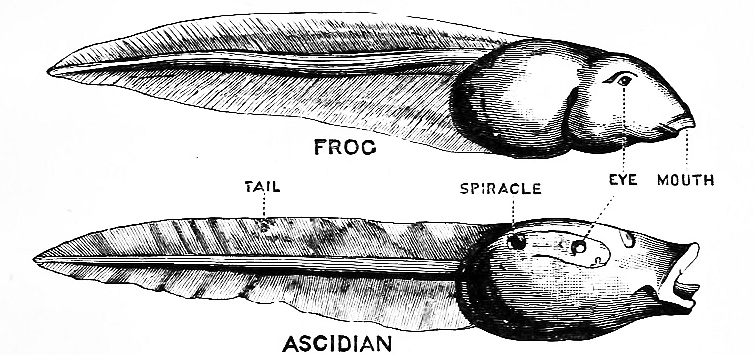
A 1901 comparison of a frog tadpole (a vertebrate) and a tunicate larva; in 1928 Walter Garstang proposed that vertebrates derived from such a larva by neoteny.

==== Garstang's hypothesis ====
Walter Garstang suggested the neotenous origin of the vertebrates from a tunicate larva, in opposition to Darwin's opinion that tunicates and vertebrates both evolved from animals whose adult form was similar to (frog) tadpoles and the 'tadpole larvae' of tunicates. According to Richard Dawkins, Garstang's opinion was also held by Alister Hardy, and is still held by some modern biologists. However, according to others, closer genetic investigation rather seems to support Darwin's old opinion:

Garstang's theory is certainly an attractive one, and it was much in favour for many years ... Unfortunately, recent DNA evidence has swung the pendulum in favour of Darwin's original theory. If the larvaceans constitute a recent re-enactment of an ancient Garstang scenario, they should find closer kinship with some modern sea squirts than with others. Alas, this is not so.

— Richard Dawkins

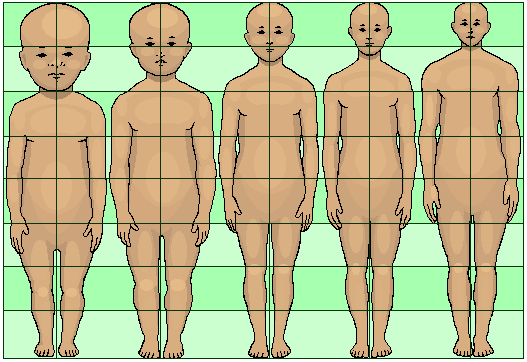
Neoteny in human development

=== In humans ===
Several heterochronies have been described in humans, relative to the chimpanzee. In chimpanzee fetuses, brain and head growth starts at about the same developmental stage and grow at a rate similar to that of humans, but growth stops soon after birth, whereas humans continue brain and head growth several years after birth. This particular type of heterochrony, hypermorphosis, involves a delay in the offset of a developmental process, or what is the same, the presence of an early developmental process in later stages of development. Humans have some 30 different neotenies in comparison to the chimpanzee, retaining larger heads, smaller jaws and noses, and shorter limbs, features found in juvenile chimpanzees.

== Related concepts ==
The term "heterokairy" was proposed in 2003 by John Spicer and Warren Burggren to distinguish plasticity in timing of the onset of developmental events at the level of an individual (heterokairy) or population (heterochrony).

== See also ==
- Developmental biology
- Embryogenesis
- Evolutionary biology
- Phylogeny
