= P. B. Tomlinson =

British botanist

Philip Barry Tomlinson (born 1932) is a British botanist specializing in tropical botany. He graduated in Biology BSc and Botany PhD from University of Leeds. He is the Edward C. Jeffrey Professor of Biology, Emeritus at Harvard Forest, Harvard University. He was awarded the Linnean Medal in 1999.

He was awarded the José Cuatrecasas Medal for Excellence in Tropical Botany in 2002.
