= Martin Embley =

British biologist

Martin Embley FRS FMedSci
- Born: Thomas Martin Embley
- Education: Newcastle University (PhD)
- Awards: EMBO Membership (2009)
- Scientific career
- Fields: Eukaryotes; Evolution
- Workplaces: Newcastle University; North East London Polytechnic; Natural History Museum, London
- Thesis: Aspects of the biology of Renibacterium salmoninarum (1983)
- Website: research.ncl.ac.uk/microbial_eukaryotes/martinembley.html

Thomas Martin Embley is a British scientist who is a professor at Newcastle University who has made contributions to the understanding of the origin of eukaryotes and the evolution of organelles such as mitochondria, mitosomes and hydrogenosomes, that are found in parasitic protists.

In May 2021, Embley was appointed as a Fellow of the Royal Society. He was elected a Fellow of the Academy of Medical Sciences in 2011.

== Education ==
Embley was educated at Newcastle University, where he was awarded a PhD on the biology of the bacterium Renibacterium salmoninarum in 1983.
