= Jack Heslop-Harrison =

English botanist

- Born: 10 February 1920; Middlesbrough, England, UK
- Died: 7 May 1998 (aged 78)
- Education: King's College, Newcastle; Queen's University Belfast
- Awards: Trail-Crisp Medal (1966); Linnean Medal (1996); Royal Medal (1996)
- Scientific career
- Fields: Botany
- Workplaces: King's College, Newcastle; Queen's University Belfast; University College London; University of Wisconsin–Madison; Royal Botanic Gardens, Kew; Aberystwyth University

John Heslop-Harrison FRS FAAAS (10 February 1920 – 8 May 1998) was a British soldier and botanist.

== Early life and education ==
He was born in Middlesbrough to John William Heslop-Harrison and his wife Christian Henderson, the last of three children. His older brother was George Heslop-Harrison.

Soon after John's birth, his father, at the time a teacher at Middlesbrough High School, accepted a position at the University of Durham as a lecturer in zoology, and the family moved to Birtley, his father's place of birth. For seven years the family lived in a small wooden cabin formerly used to house World War I refugees until Jack's father, upon his promotion to Professor of Botany, felt rich enough to buy his own house. When he was four he attended the Elizabethville Infant School, later moving to the Elizabethville Elementary School until he was 11, when he was accepted into the Chester-le-Street Secondary School. He completed the Higher School Certificate Examinations in 1938, scoring highly in chemistry and physics but not highly enough in mathematics to win the State Scholarship he required to go to the universities of Oxford or Cambridge. He took the King's College Scholarship Examination as well, not doing well enough in chemistry to get in. After returning from a holiday in Rùm he found that one of the boys above him had dropped out, and he was now applicable for a scholarship of £60 a year to attend King's College, Newcastle, which he did in October 1938 to study chemistry, zoology and botany.

== University life ==
At university he was taught by Meirion Thomas and Kathleen B Blackburn, who had been a collaborator with his father. He also met Yolande Massey, his future wife; they took the same courses and frequently competed for top marks. The city suffered irregular bombing raids during World War II, one of which happened during one of his final examination papers, forcing them to stop and go to the service tunnels they used as an air-raid shelter. He eventually graduated with first-class honours in Biology, as did Yolande.

== World War II ==
Due to his position as a university student Heslop-Harrison was given deferred entry to the armed forces after the introduction of conscription for World War II. He was provisionally given a place on a radio operator course, and as a result spent some of his remaining time at the university doing a course at the physics department on electronic wave theory, something which had no relation whatsoever to his eventual position. He was trained to operate radio equipment in relation to radar and geolocation, and towards the end of the course also got to handle the then-new cavity magnetron. He graduated first in his course and chose to be posted to Orkney. He was given a position at an AA battery near Dounby with the equivalent rank to that of second lieutenant, something the battery commander was not happy with since Heslop-Harrison was effectively a civilian. He was next commissioned as a second lieutenant in the Royal Army Ordnance Corps on 17 April 1942, and was later moved to South Ronaldsay. As part of his technical work he was a frequent visitor to the Royal Electrical and Mechanical Engineers (REME) base on the Orkney mainland, and, after his commanding officer finally lost patience with the operating officer, Heslop-Harrison was offered a position as operator of the complex and a promotion to captain, which he accepted. He officially transferred to REME on 1 October 1942.

His time at Orkney was (for the most part) boring. After the beginning of the V2 attacks he took part in the efforts to develop a radar capable of tracking their trajectories, but after a few failed attempts at developing such a device the project was called off with the Allied occupation of V2 launching sites.

In March 1945 he was posted to 21 Army Group Headquarters in Brussels, where he was tasked with retrieving a sample of the fungus Eremothecium ashbyi from the Dutch National Mycological Collection at Baarn; it had proved useful in synthesising vitamin B, something in demand in post-war Europe. After VE Day he was again reposted, this time to join T-force, teams tasked to retrieve technological data from German research facilities as they were discovered. His team proceeded to Pelzerhaken, near Denmark, where many of the scientists uprooted by allied bombings had been based. Here the team found research into infra red detection, radar systems and U-boat signature masking.

== Academic life ==
After completion of his reports he was discharged from the army to work for Glaxo in penicillin production, but soon left to become a junior lecturer at King's College. A year later, finding it difficult to cope with an underfunded department, he moved to Queen's University in Belfast. The department was small, consisting of a professor, a lecturer and a second (part-time) lecturer, and when Heslop-Harrison applied to take a PhD there was nobody qualified to supervise him. He acted as a guide at the 1949 International Phytogeographic Excursion where he met W. H. Pearsall, who before leaving offered him a place as a lecturer at University College London, with the understanding that he would be shortly made a Reader should everything work out.

He moved to UCL in 1950, becoming a Reader in 1953, but returned to Queen's in 1954. It was here he began spelling his name as Heslop-Harrison; with a colleague of his called Douglas Harrison letters were regularly delivered to the wrong person. He did not personally get involved in research, but regularly assisted other scientists with various papers and theses. He left Queen's again in 1960 to become a professor of botany at the University of Birmingham

At Birmingham the university was in the process of unifying its various biology departments in one School of Biological Sciences, something he oversaw and became Chair of in 1963. In 1967 he was awarded the Trail-Crisp Medal by the Linnean Society of London, and the same year became the first Chairman of the Institute of Plant Development at the University of Wisconsin–Madison. In March 1970 he was elected a Fellow of the Royal Society, and delivered the Royal Society's Croonian Lecture in 1974. In 1970 he received an honorary degree from Queen's, something that was apparently prized more than others due to his history with the institution. He relinquished it in 1995 due to the increasing political instability in Northern Ireland.

== Director at Kew ==
In 1970 he was formally offered the position of Director of the Royal Botanic Gardens, Kew, a much-prized position. He spent about a year as "director-designate" without official duties or pay and spent much of this time researching for his position, meaning that by the time he was officially appointed he had a clear idea of the direction in which he wanted to take the Gardens. In 1974 he delivered the Royal Society's Croonian Lecture, and his presentation was well received. He made large changes to the way the institute worked but clashed with the government, who funded the institute, and eventually resigned in 1976, the first Director to do so since the position was created in 1822.

== After Kew ==
After leaving Kew, he was offered a position as Royal Society Research Professor at Aberystwyth University, which he accepted, becoming thoroughly engrossed in research; from his departure from Kew onwards he published 106 papers. In 1982 he was awarded the Darwin Medal of the Royal Society jointly with his wife, and the same year was made a Foreign Honorary Member of the American Academy of Arts and Sciences. In 1982 he received an Honorary Doctorate from the University of Bath. In 1985 he retired as Research Professor due to the age requirement, but both he and Yolande were made Honorary Visiting Workers. In 1996 he was awarded the Linnean Medal and the Royal Medal. He died on 8 May 1998.
