= Charles Russell Metcalfe =

English botanist and explorer (1904–1991)

- Born: 1904
- Died: 1991 (aged 86–87)
- Education: University of Cambridge
- Awards: Linnean Medal, OBE
- Scientific career
- Thesis: The 'Shab' disease of Lavender
- Author abbrev. (botany): CRMetcalfe

Charles Russell Metcalfe (1904–1991) was an English botanist and explorer, who undertook botanical collecting expeditions in west Cameroon.

== Selected publications ==
- Tomlinson, Philip Barry; Metcalfe, Charles Russell (1982). Anatomy of the monocotyledons. Vol. 7 (illustrated ed.). Clarendon Press. ISBN 9780198545026.
- Metcalfe, Charles Russell; Chalk, Laurence (1979). Anatomy of the dicotyledons. Vol. 1 (2nd ed.). Clarendon Press. ISBN 9780198543831.
- Robson, Norman Keith Bonnor; Cutler, David Frederick; Gregory, Mary (1970). New research in plant anatomy. Linnean Soc. of London / Academic Press. ISBN 0125906501.
- Metcalfe, C.R. (1976). "History of the Jodrell Laboratory as a centre for systematic anatomy" (PDF). Leiden Botanical Series (3): 1–19.

== Honours ==
- 1971: Linnean Medal

=== Eponymy ===
Genera

- (Poaceae) Metcalfia Conert
