= John William Heslop-Harrison =

Professor of Botany at Kings College, Newcastle

John William Heslop Harrison
- Born: 1881; Birtley, Tyne and Wear
- Died: 23 January 1967 (aged 85–86); Birtley, Tyne and Wear
- Education: Durham University
- Awards: Fellow of the Royal Society

John William Heslop Harrison, FRS, FRSE (1881–1967) was a professor of Botany at Kings College, Newcastle-Upon-Tyne, specialising in the genetics of moths. He is now best remembered for a widely recognised academic fraud.

== Early life and education ==
He was born in Birtley on 22 January 1881, the son of George Heslop-Harrison, a pattern-maker at Birtley Iron Works. He was educated at Bede College School in Durham then Rutherford School for Boys in Newcastle upon Tyne. His mother was a keen gardener, and other influences such as his uncle, Rev J E Hull, and neighbour, Charles Robson, led him to an early interest in botany and natural history.

He then studied at Durham College of Science, where he obtained a BSc degree in 1903. He did further postgraduate study at the University of Newcastle, gaining an MSc degree in 1916 and a DSc in 1917.

In 1921 he was elected a Fellow of the Royal Society of Edinburgh (FRSE). His proposers were James Hartley Ashworth, Sir Thomas Hudson Beare, Percy Hall Grimshaw, and James Ritchie. He served as the Society's Vice-President 1945–1948. He was elected a Fellow of the Royal Society (FRS) in 1928.

He died in Birtley, Tyne and Wear on 23 January 1967.

== Career ==
From 1903 to 1905 he was a schoolmaster in Gateshead and then until 1917 in Middlesbrough.

In 1917 he began lecturing in Genetics and Botany at the University of Newcastle being given a professorship in 1927. He remained in this role until retiring in 1946.

=== Rùm ===
In 1948 he was determined by John Raven, a University of Cambridge classics tutor, to have made false claims to have discovered certain plant species on the island of Rùm on the west coast of Scotland. Whether or not such grasses were on Rùm is pivotal to a theory that the islands escaped the last ice age. The fraud claim is described – and its veracity supported – in Karl Sabbagh's 1999 book, A Rum Affair. In 2008 further proof about the forgeries committed by Heslop-Harrison emerged.

=== Lamarckian experiments ===
Heslop Harrison was described as a loner who avoided as much contact as possible with other professionals and conducted most of his experiments at his home in Birtley, Tyne and Wear. He was a supporter of Lamarckian evolution from his experiments with moths and sawflies. According to researcher Michael A. Salmon "Heslop Harrison claimed to have experimental proof that physical changes in the life of an individual moth or sawfly could be passed on to its progeny, according to the theory of Lamarck... For example, Heslop Harrison thought that melanism resulted from the effect of pollution on individual moths which somehow altered their genes. When others attempted to repeat his experiment, however, they always seemed to come up with different results."

In the 1920s, Heslop Harrison conducted experiments on the peppered moth, claiming to have evidence for the inheritance of acquired characteristics. Other scientists failed to replicate his results. His experiments were criticised by J. B. S. Haldane.

== Family ==
In 1906 he married Christian Watson Henderson. Their eldest son was George Heslop-Harrison FRSE who also came to fame as an entomologist.

Heslop Harrison's fourth son was Jack Heslop-Harrison who became director of the Royal Botanic Gardens, Kew in 1970. His daughter Helena married the botanist William Andrew Clark.
