= George Heslop-Harrison =

British entomologist (1911–1964)

Dr George Heslop-Harrison FRSE (1911 – 3 June 1964) was a British entomologist. He was Head of the Department of Agricultural Zoology at Newcastle University. He specialised in crops and the insects which fed upon them, writing papers that included the taxonomy of the Psyllidae.

== Life ==
He was born in 1911 the son of John William Heslop-Harrison and his wife, Christian Watson Henderson. His younger brother was Jack Heslop-Harrison. George studied at Durham University graduating BSc in 1932. He received a doctorate (PhD) in 1934.

In 1934/35 he accompanied his father on trips to the Scottish islands including Canna, Raasay and Eigg. It is not clear if he also accompanied him on the controversial trip to Rùm, which escalated into a scandal in the botanical world, when his father claimed evidence of various grass species, evidencing that the island had escaped the Ice Age.

In 1936 he became director of Plant Pathology and Entomology in Iraq.

In the Second World War he was conscripted and at first was in service in Egypt. However, through connections he was transferred to India where he obtained the very odd rank of Captain Entomologist.

After the war he returned to Britain as a lecturer in Agricultural Zoology at Newcastle and was in this role for the rest of his life. In 1947 he was elected a Fellow of the Royal Society of Edinburgh. His proposers were Alfred Hobson, Robert Wheldon, his father John William Heslop-Harrison and Meirion Thomas. Durham University awarded him a further honorary doctorate (DSc) in 1961.

== Personal life ==
He was married to Dorothy. He died on 3 June 1964 aged 53.

== Publications ==
- Natural History on the Isle of Raasay (1938)
