= List of mycology journals =

The following is a list of journals and magazines in the field of mycology:

Title	Location/Publisher	Years
Annales Mycologici	Berlin, Germany	1903–1944, continued as Sydowia
Belarra	Sociedad Micologica Barakaldo	1975–
Bulletin de la Société Mycologique de France	Société Mycologique de France	1885-
Bulletin of the British Mycological Society	British Mycological Society	1967–1986, replaced by Mycologist
Cryptogamie Mycologie	Muséum National d'Histoire Naturelle - Paris	1980-
Experimental Mycology	New York, Orlando	1977–1995, Continued by Fungal Genetics and Biology
Field Mycology	British Mycological Society	2000–
Fungal Biology	British Mycological Society	2010–
Fungal Biology Reviews	British Mycological Society	2007–
Fungal Diversity	Hong Kong	1998–
Fungal Ecology	British Mycological Society	2008–
Fungal Genetics and Biology	Orlando	1995–, Continues Experimental Mycology
Herzogia	Vaduz	1968–
International Journal of Medicinal Mushrooms		
Journal of Fungi	MDPI (Basel, Switzerland)	2015–
Journal of Mycology	Manhattan	1885–1908, replaced by Mycologia
Medical Mycology	Taylor and Francis, Volume 1–23 published as Sabouraudia and Volumes 24–33 published as Journal of Medical and Veterinary Mycology	1972–
MycoKeys	Pensoft Publishers, Bulgaria	2011-
Mycologia	Mycological Society of America, New York	1909–
Mycological Progress	German Mycological Society	2002–
Mycological Research	British Mycological Society	1989–2009, replaced by Fungal Biology
Mycologist	British Mycological Society	1987–2006, continued as Fungal Biology Reviews
Mycopathologia	Kluwer Academic Publishers	1938–, Volumes 5 (1950) to 54 (1974) were published as Mycopathologia et Mycologia Applicata
Mycoscience	Elsevier, Tokyo (Mycological Society of Japan)	
Mycoses	Blackwell Publishing	
Mycotaxon	Mycotaxon Ltd.	1974–
New Zealand Journal of Botany	Royal Society of New Zealand	1963–
Nova Hedwigia		1959–
Ohio Mycological Bulletin	Columbus, Ohio	1903–1908
The Open Mycology Journal	Bentham Open	
Persoonia	National Herbarium of the Netherlands	1959–
Revue de Mycologie	Muséum National d'Histoire Naturelle - Paris	1936-1979, continued as Cryptogamie Mycologie
Studies in Mycology	Utrecht, CBS Fungal Biodiversity Centre	1972–
Sydowia	Vienna, Austria/Print Office Berger	1947–
Yeast	Wiley-Blackwell	1985–
Transactions of the British Mycological Society	British Mycological Society	1897–1988, continued as Mycological Research
