= Outline of fungi =

Overview of and topical guide to fungi

The following outline is provided as an overview of and topical guide to fungi and mycology:

Fungi – "Fungi" is plural for "fungus". A fungus is any member of the group of eukaryotic organisms that includes unicellular microorganisms such as yeasts and molds, as well as multicellular fungi that produce familiar fruiting forms known as mushrooms. Biologists classify these organisms as a kingdom, Fungi, the second highest taxonomic rank of living organism beneath the Eukaryota domain; other kingdoms include plants, animals, protists, and bacteria. One difference that places fungi in a different kingdom is that their cell walls contain chitin, unlike the cell walls of plants, bacteria and some protists. Similar to animals, fungi are heterotrophs, that is, they acquire their food by absorbing dissolved molecules, typically by secreting digestive enzymes into their environment. Growth is their means of mobility, except for spores (a few of which are flagellated), which may travel through air or water. Fungi function as the principal decomposers in ecological systems.

== Types of fungi ==
- By form
  - Molds
    - Aspergillus (list)
    - Fusarium (list)
  - Mushrooms
    - Agaricus (list)
    - Amanita (list)
    - Armillaria (list)
    - Boletus (list)
    - Coprinellus (list)
    - Coprinopsis (list)
    - Cortinarius (list)
    - Entoloma (list)
    - Gymnopilus (list)
    - Gymnopus (list)
    - Hebeloma (list)
    - Hygrocybe (list)
    - Hygrophorus (list)
    - Inocybe (list)
    - Lactarius (list)
    - Lactifluus (list)
    - Lepiota (list)
    - Leucoagaricus (list)
    - Leccinum (list)
    - Marasmius (list)
    - Pleurotus (list)
  - Yeasts
  - Other
    - Cyathus (list)
- By activity
  - Carnivorous fungi
  - Pathogenic fungi
  - Poisonous fungi
    - Poisonous mushrooms
      - List of poisonous mushrooms
        - List of deadly mushrooms
- By aspect
  - Bioluminescent fungi
  - Deadly fungi
- By use
  - Medicinal fungi
  - Edible fungi
    - Edible molds
      - Penicillium camemberti – used in the production of Brie cheese and Camembert cheese
      - Penicillium glaucum – used in making Gorgonzola cheese
      - Penicillium roqueforti – used in making Roquefort cheese, Danish Blue cheese, and also recently Gorgonzola
    - Edible mushrooms

== Symbiotic life forms of which fungi are a part ==
- Lichen – composite organism that arises from algae or cyanobacteria living among filaments of multiple fungi in a symbiotic relationship. Lichens are classified by the fungal component. Lichen species are given the same scientific name (binomial name) as the fungus species in the lichen. Lichens are being integrated into the classification schemes for fungi.
  - Caloplaca (list)
  - Cladonia (list)
  - Lecanora (list)

== Study of fungi ==
Mycology

- Branches of mycology
  - Lichenology (outline)
  - Mycotoxicology

== History of fungi ==
- History of mycology

== Fungi-related publications ==
- Books about fungi
- Mycology journals
  - Fungal Biology
  - Fungal Genetics and Biology
  - Medical Mycology
  - Mycologia
  - Mycological Progress
  - Mycoscience
  - Mycoses
  - Mycotaxon
  - Sydowia

== Persons influential in fungi ==
- List of mycologists

== See also ==
- Outline of biology
- Outline of lichens
