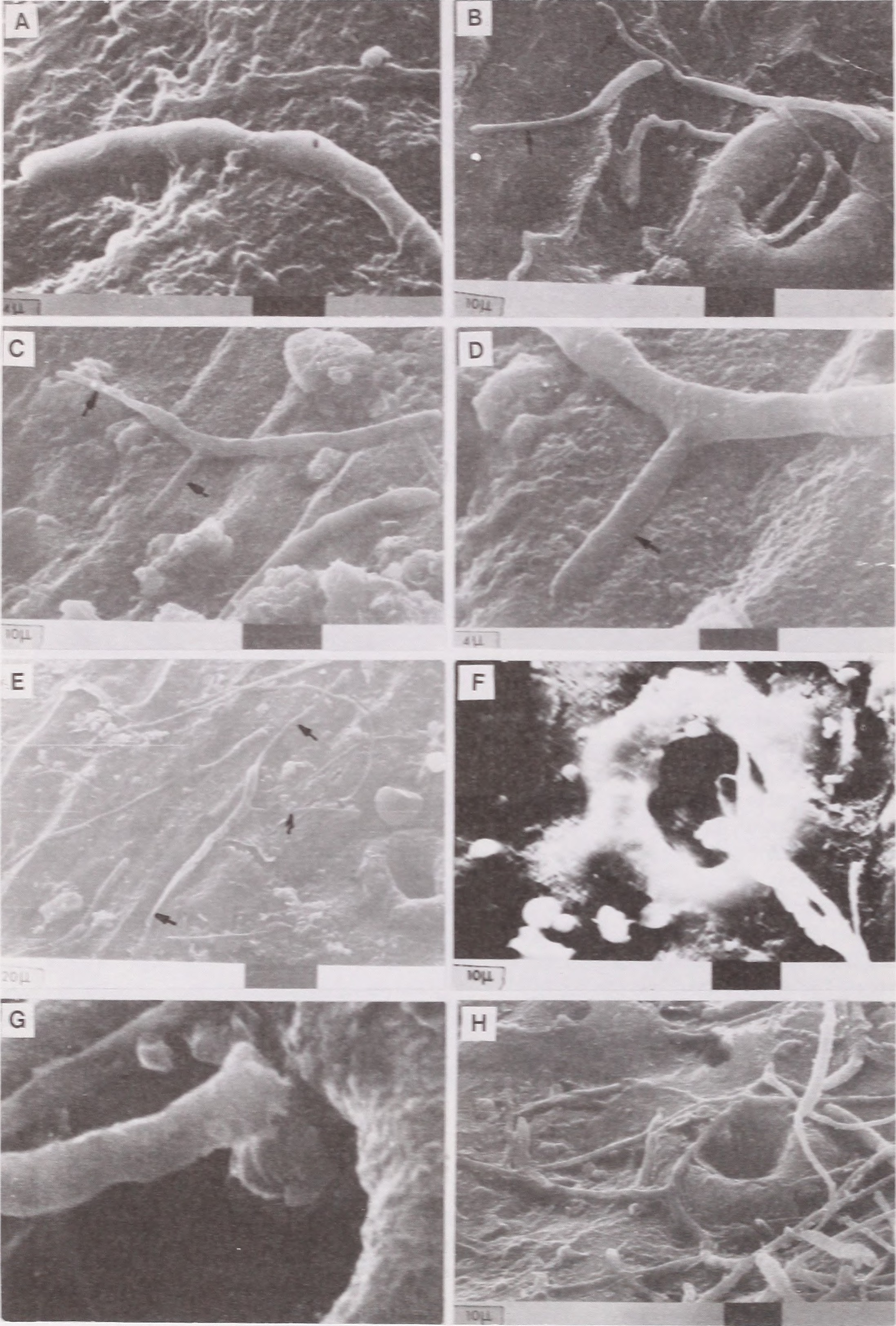
- D. septosporum. A. Conidium of the fungus on an Austrian pine needle. B.C.D.E. Germinating conidia. F. Direct penetration of the germ tube through a stoma. G. Appressorium-like structure formed in the antestomatal chamber. H. Secondary conidia developing on mycelium on the surface of the needle.

Scientific classification
- Kingdom: Fungi
- Division: Ascomycota
- Class: Dothideomycetes
- Order: Mycosphaerellales
- Family: Mycosphaerellaceae
- Genus: Dothistroma
- Species: D. septosporum

Binomial name
- Dothistroma septosporum (Dorogin) M. Morelet 1968 (as 'septospora')

Synonyms
- Eruptio pini (Rostr.) M.E.Barr (1996); Mycosphaerella pini Rostr. ex Munk (1957)

= Dothistroma septosporum =

Species of fungus

Dothistroma septosporum
- Mycological characteristics
- Ecology is parasitic

Dothistroma septosporum or Mycosphaerella pini is a hemibiotrophic species of fungus that causes the disease commonly known as red band needle blight. This fungal disease affects the needles of conifers, and is mainly found on pine (Pinus sp.). Over 60 species have been reported to be prone to infection and Corsican pine (Pinus nigra ssp. laricio) is the most susceptible species in Great Britain.

The precise origins of D. septosporum are unknown, although there are suggestions that the disease might be from the pine forests of Nepal, in the Himalayas. The origin is alternatively thought to be from the high-altitude rain forests of South America. The general opinion is that the fungus has been prevalent for some length of time in the Southern Hemisphere, where D. septosporum caused significant damage to non-native pine populations starting in the 1950s and 1960s. Since the 1990s, high levels of infection have also been reported in the Northern Hemisphere, with unprecedented records of the disease in Asia and Europe.

== Taxonomy ==
Dothistroma septosporum along with D. pini is a causal agent of Dothistroma needle blight. These two species can be clearly distinguished based on DNA sequence data; however, before 2004, they were considered as one species and the names were commonly interchanged. This confusion in their taxonomy stems from independent roots of the species name, one in Europe and the other in the United States. In the United States, the asexual state of the pathogen was described by Robert L. Hulbary in 1941 as Dothistroma pini. The pathogen had also previously been described as Actinothyrium marginatum, Cryptosporium acicola, Septoria acicola and it was confused with Lecanosticta acicola, a closely related, but distinctly different pathogen that causes brown-spot needle blight. Dothistroma needle blight is also commonly known as the red band needle blight.

== Life cycle ==
Dothistroma septosporum is a hemibiotroph, which follows two stages of development, biotrophic and necrotrophic, upon infecting an organism. Spread initially in moist conditions, the pathogen requires physical transport either through mist and rain, or by direct contact with other infected needles. Once the needles have been exposed, the fungus germinates. The ideal germination temperature is 12–18 °C, with high levels of humidity. This begins the biotrophic phase of the fungus' lifecycle; it subsequently penetrates the needle through the stoma, then colonizes the epistomatal chambers. Following this, the fungus begins its necrotrophic phase; it colonizes the mesophyll and produces the toxin dothistromin, which causes necrosis of cell tissue. The needles will then begin to show signs of infection, and eventually the pathogen produces stromata, which is the pathogen's fruiting body (sporocarps). These are formed in the spring and early summer, and usually coincide with above-average levels of rainfall. From these the blight is then passed on to the following year's growth. The stromata can be seen as a clear or white mass exuding from red spots on the leaf.

=== Reproduction ===
Dothistroma septosporum is able to reproduce asexually (in the anamorphic stage) as well as sexually (in the teleomorphic stage), but the teleomorphic stage is uncommonly found. The sexual reproduction of the disease holds a greater danger as the division of cells that comes with meiosis allows a far greater genetic variation of the disease, and increases its ability to adapt to local climates and resistance to various forms of control. The pathogen reproduces both asexually and sexually in the United Kingdom. The teleomorph that is produced from complete sexual reproduction, Mycosphaerella pini, has not been found in the United Kingdom.

== Disease ==
=== Symptoms ===
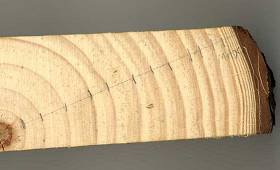
Annual growth rings at the section of a Corsican pine log, showing the reduction in yearly growth (log perimeter), and consequently timber yield due to Dothistroma septosporum.

The symptoms give the disease its name. The first signs of infection that can be seen are yellow and brown spots that develop on the living needles, which soon turn red. This infection starts on the base of the crown on older needles, which then turn a brownish red at the tip, while the rest of the needle remains green. This can be seen clearly between the months of June and July, after which the needles begin to 'turn up', much like a lion's tail. This infection is then passed on to the following years growth, which continues year after year. This ongoing spread of infection weakens the tree over time, with larger percentages of crown infection leading to lower yields of timber and, in some cases, to the mortality of the tree.

=== Damage ===
The disease causes defoliation which increases year on year. This reduces yield of timber growth and weakens the tree, serving as a predisposing factor to other diseases. In several cases of infection, the disease can lead to complete mortality of the tree. Infection may take several years to severely reduce yield, as crown infection under 40% is directly proportional to the reduction in yield. Once crown infection has reached 80% there is no growth at all.

== Distribution ==
Dothistroma septosporum is found on all continents of the world, except Antarctica. It has a very broad climate range, including subarctic, Mediterranean, and dry tropical climate regions. According to Drenkhan et al. (2016), the needle blight disease had been reported in 76 countries globally, with D. septosporum confirmed in 44 of those countries. Dothistroma species had been found to be hosted primarily by species in the Pinaceae family. Over 60 species have been reported to be prone to infection.

=== Africa ===
Needle blight was first observed in Rhodesia (now Zimbabwe) in the 1940s; however, it was not known at that time to be caused by Dothistroma species. Pine populations in East Africa were significantly affected by needle blight in the 1950s and 1960s, which resulted in the abandonment of planting Pinus radiata species in the region. D. septosporum has been confirmed in seven countries, including Kenya, Tanzania, Zimbabwe, and South Africa. It has been observed to be sexually-reproducing in Kenya and South Africa.

=== Asia ===
D. septosporum has been confirmed to infect Pinus radiata and Pinus wallichiana conifers in Bhutan.

=== North America ===
Early reports described the disease as being present in North America prior to the 1920s; the first attestation of infected needles was in Idaho in 1917. Dendrochronological studies indicate that the disease was present in British Columbia as early as 1831.

=== South America ===
Pine populations in Chile were significantly affected by needle blight in the 1950s and 1960s. D. septosporum has additionally been reported in Ecuador and Colombia.

=== Europe ===
Early reports described the disease as being present in Europe prior to the 1920s; the first reports of needle blight were in 1860 in France, 1878 in Austria, 1880 in Denmark, and 1910 in European Russia. D. septosporum was first described in eastern Europe in 1911. Reports of the disease were seen sporadically in the 1980s, but significant economic impact in Europe, particularly in France and the United Kingdom, only began in the 1990s.

D. septosporum is endemic in the Baltic states, as well as in Norway and Finland.

Between 1997 and 2005, the majority of reports in the United Kingdom were on Corsican pine in East Anglia, although it had been found in other parts of Britain since the 1950s. It was first reported in Northern Ireland in 2011, and D. septosporum was first confirmed in the Republic of Ireland in September 2016.

In 2019, the European Union named D. septosporum a Regulated Non-Quarantine Pest (RNQP) due to its wide occurrence and economic impact.

=== Oceania ===
Dothistroma needle blight was first reported in New Zealand in 1964; it had become widespread in the country by 1967. D. septosporum has since been confirmed in both New Zealand and Australia, while needle blight has also been reported in Papua New Guinea.

== Control and management ==
As a fungal disease, any intervention that increases airflow and reduces humidity will be beneficial. Thinning and pruning of sites allows areas to be less prone to the development of D. septosporum, and it has been observed that delays in the first thinning in East Anglia resulted in high mortality rates in the crop. Copper-based fungicides have been found to be effective in controlling D. septosporum, and are widely used in Australia and New Zealand; however, the environmental and economic factors behind copper-based fungicide treatment of large-scale commercial crops makes this method of control difficult and inadvisable.

== Works cited ==
Books

- Brown (2007). Red Band Needle Blight In Britain. Forestry Commission.
- Peterson (1982). Dothistroma Needle Blight of Pine. United States Forest Service.

Journals

- Barnes, I.; Kirisits, T.; Akulov, A.; Chhetri, D. B.; Wingfield, B. D.; Bulgakov, T. S.; Wingfield, M. J. (2008). "New host and country records of the Dothistroma needle blight pathogens from Europe and Asia". Forest Pathology. 38 (3): 178–195. doi:10.1111/j.1439-0329.2007.00536.x. ISSN 1437-4781.
- Barnes, I.; van der Nest, A.; Mullett, M. S.; Crous, P. W.; Drenkhan, R.; Musolin, D. L.; Wingfield, M. J. (2016). Woodward, S. (ed.). "Neotypification of Dothistroma septosporum and epitypification of D. pini, causal agents of Dothistroma needle blight of pine". Forest Pathology. 46 (5): 388–407. Bibcode:2016FoPat..46..388B. doi:10.1111/efp.12304. ISSN 1437-4781.
- Brown, A.; Webber, J. (2008). "Red Band Needle Blight of Pines in Britain" (PDF). Forestry Commission. ISSN 1756-5758.
- Bulman, L. S.; Bradshaw, R. E.; Fraser, S.; Martín-García, J.; Barnes, I.; Musolin, D. L.; Porta, N. La; Woods, A. J.; Diez, J. J.; Koltay, A.; Drenkhan, R.; Ahumada, R.; Poljakovic-Pajnik, L.; Queloz, V.; Piškur, B. (1 October 2016). "A worldwide perspective on the management and control of Dothistroma needle blight". Forest Pathology. 46 (5): 472–488. Bibcode:2016FoPat..46..472B. doi:10.1111/efp.12305. hdl:2263/58638. ISSN 1439-0329.
- Drenkhan, R.; Tomešová-Haataja, V.; Fraser, S.; Bradshaw, R. E.; Vahalík, P.; Mullett, M. S.; Martín-García, J.; Bulman, L. S.; Wingfield, M. J.; Kirisits, T.; Cech, T. L.; Schmitz, S.; Baden, R.; Tubby, K.; Brown, A. (2016). Cleary, M. (ed.). "Global geographic distribution and host range of Dothistroma species: a comprehensive review". Forest Pathology. 46 (5): 408–442. Bibcode:2016FoPat..46..408D. doi:10.1111/efp.12290. hdl:20.500.12885/1047. ISSN 1437-4781.
- Kabir, M. S.; Ganley, R. J.; Bradshaw, R. E. (2015). "The hemibiotrophic lifestyle of the fungal pine pathogen Dothistroma septosporum". Forest Pathology. 45 (3): 190–202. Bibcode:2015FoPat..45..190K. doi:10.1111/efp.12153. ISSN 1439-0329.
- Munk, Anders (1957). "Danish Pyrenomycetes. A preliminary flora". Dansk Botanisk Arkiv. 17 (1): 312.
- Mullett, Martin S.; Drenkhan, Rein; Adamson, Kalev; Boroń, Piotr; Lenart-Boroń, Anna; Barnes, Irene; Tomšovský, Michal; Jánošíková, Zuzana; Adamčíková, Katarína; Ondrušková, Emília; Queloz, Valentin; Piškur, Barbara; Musolin, Dmitry L.; Davydenko, Kateryna; Georgieva, Margarita (3 February 2021). "Worldwide Genetic Structure Elucidates the Eurasian Origin and Invasion Pathways of Dothistroma septosporum, Causal Agent of Dothistroma Needle Blight". Journal of Fungi. 7 (2): 111. doi:10.3390/jof7020111. ISSN 2309-608X. PMC 7913368.
- Piotrowska, M. J.; Ennos, R.; Riddell, C.; Hoebe, P. N. (2016). "Fungicide sensitivity of Dothistroma septosporum isolates in the UK". Forest Pathology: 1–5. doi:10.1111/efp.12314. hdl:20.500.11820/0a6586ec-b433-42fb-8543-14e97fc502db.
- Theron, Cheyenne Amor (November 2022). Characterization of Lecanosticta and Lophodermium species on non-native pines in the Southern Hemisphere (MSc thesis). University of Pretoria.
- Adamson, Kalev; Mullett, Martin S.; Solheim, Halvor; Barnes, Irene; Müller, Michael M.; Hantula, Jarkko; Vuorinen, Martti; Kačergius, Audrius; Markovskaja, Svetlana; Musolin, Dmitry L.; Davydenko, Kateryna; Keča, Nenad; Ligi, Karli; Priedite, Rasa D.; Millberg, Hanna (January 2018). "Looking for relationships between the populations of Dothistroma septosporum in northern Europe and Asia". Fungal Genetics and Biology. 110: 15–25. doi:10.1016/j.fgb.2017.12.001. ISSN 1087-1845. Archived from the original on 13 April 2024.
- Watt, Michael S.; Kriticos, Darren J.; Alcaraz, Samantha; Brown, Anna V.; Leriche, Agathe (March 2009). "The hosts and potential geographic range of Dothistroma needle blight". Forest Ecology and Management. 257 (6): 1505–1519. doi:10.1016/j.foreco.2008.12.026. ISSN 0378-1127. Archived from the original on 13 April 2024.

Websites

- Brown, A.; Rose, D.; Webber, J. (2003). "Red Band Needle Blight of Pine" (PDF). Forestry Commission. ISSN 1460-3802.
- "Disease symptoms and life cycle of Dothistroma (red band) needle blight". Forest Research. Archived from the original on 6 December 2025.
- "Dothistroma Needle Blight". Teagasc | Agriculture and Food Development Authority.
