= Richard Summerbell =

Canadian mycologist (born 1956)

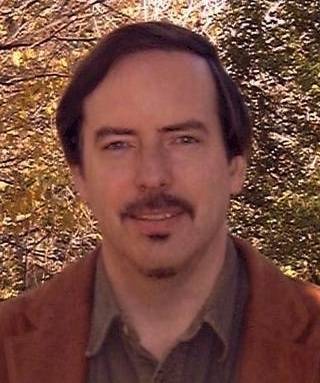
- Summerbell in 2005
- Born: 29 June 1956 (age 70); Brooks, Alberta
- Education: University of British Columbia, University of Toronto
- Scientific career
- Fields: Mycology
- Author abbrev. (botany): Summerb.

Richard C. Summerbell (born 29 June 1956) is a Canadian mycologist, author and award-winning songwriter. He was editor-in-chief of an international scientific journal Medical Mycology from 2000 to 2004. In the 1970s and 1980s, he was a gay activist and an early commentator on (then) controversial topics such as AIDS and promiscuity and attitudes to homosexuality in organized religion.

Born in Brooks, Alberta, Summerbell trained as a botanist, receiving his master's degree from the University of British Columbia and his doctorate degree from the University of Toronto. He has lived with his partner, Ross Fraser, since 1978 and currently resides in Toronto, Ontario, Canada.

== Research in mycology ==
Summerbell has published over 150 peer-reviewed papers in mycology, botany and bacteriology, including research papers in journals such as Nature and Philosophical Transactions of the Royal Society. Much of the research explores opportunistic fungal pathogens—those that grow on (and at the expense of) humans and animals—and the unique ways in which these organisms exploit their environments. These environments are diverse. They include biofilms in hospital plumbing that harbour fungal pathogens which attack patients hospitalized for leukemia or major organ transplants. They also include waterfront vacation properties on streams, lakes or rivers that infect otherwise healthy visitors with the often deadly disease blastomycosis. His most cited works are on the fungi that cause human skin diseases (dermatophytes) and nail infections (onychomycosis). As of July 9, 2010, his 1989 paper on onychomycosis is the most-cited original research paper published in the over 50-year history of the journal Mycoses.

Summerbell spent a decade as the Chief of Medical Mycology at the Ontario Ministry of Health Public Health Lab in Toronto, followed by 6 years as senior scientist at the Centraalbureau voor Schimmelcultures (renamed Westerdijk Fungal Biodiversity Institute) a mycological institute and branch of the Royal Netherlands Academy of Arts and Sciences in Utrecht, Netherlands He was editor-in-chief of the international scientific journal Medical Mycology from 2000 to 2004. Since 2008, he has been a faculty member of the University of Toronto Dalla Lana School of Public Health and research director of Sporometrics, a Toronto-based microbiological testing company.

Summerbell has co-authored two textbooks in medical mycology, Identifying Filamentous Fungi (simultaneously published in French as Champignons Filamenteux D'Intérêt Medical) and Laboratory Handbook of Dermatophytes.

Species (co-)described include:

- Arachnomyces kanei (asexual state Onychocola kanei), an invader of human nails
- Phaeoacremonium krajdenii, a cause of subcutaneous infection of humans
- Phaeoacremonium alvesii, a cause of subcutaneous infection of humans
- Phaeoacremonium amstelodamense, a cause of human joint infection
- Phaeoacremonium australiense, an endophyte of grapevines
- Phaeoacremonium griseorubrum, a cause of human fungemia (blood infection)
- Phaeoacremonium scolyti, an endophyte of grapevine, also isolated from bark beetle larvae
- Phaeoacremonium subulatum, an endophyte of grapevine
- Phaeoacremonium tardicrescens, from unspecified human medical source
- Phaeoacremonium venezuelense, from eumycetoma of the human foot
- Phaeoacremonium sphinctrophorum, from fungal cyst of the human foot
- Phaeoacremonium theobromatis, from stem of wild mountain cocoa (Theobroma gileri) in Ecuador
- Neocudoniella radicella, ectomycorrhizal with black spruce (Picea mariana)
- Teberdinia hygrophila a northern and alpine soil fungus
- Acremonium fuci, an endophyte of brown marine algae in the genus Fucus
- Acremonium exuviarum, from shed skin of lizard
- Fusarium delphinoides, from diseased succulent plant Hoodia gordonii and from human eye infection
- Fusarium biseptatum, from South African soil
- Fusarium penzigii, from decayed wood and human eye infection
- Phialosimplex caninus, cause of fatal infections in dogs
- Phaeomoniella pinifoliorum, a surface colonizer of pine needles
- Phaeomoniella zymoides, also from pine needles

The genus Summerbellia and the species Sarocladium summerbellii have been named in Summerbell's honour.

== Gay activism ==
Summerbell began working as a gay activist in 1979 when he became president of the gay and lesbian student association at the University of British Columbia. He was co-host of Coming Out, Canada's first gay and lesbian radio programme on CFRO-FM in Vancouver from 1978 to 1980. He was also an editor of the gay liberation magazine The Body Politic from 1982 to 1986 and a contributor to other early Canadian gay publications such as Q Magazine. As a gay activist, he was an early commentator on (then) controversial topics such as AIDS and promiscuity, and attitudes to homosexuality in Christianity, Judaism and Islam.

In 1985, he published a humorous look at gay life and culture entitled Abnormally Happy: A Gay Dictionary that satirizes stereotypical views of gays and lesbians.

Summerbell also authored an early safe sex campaign series called "Is There a Condom in Your Life?" in Toronto gay newspaper Xtra!, beginning in 1987.

== Music ==
As a songwriter and musician, Summerbell released an independent CD, Light Carries On, in 2004. One song from the CD, Thank you for being My Dog, won the 7th Annual Great American Song Contest in the Special Music category and won Summerbell a place in the Great American Song Hall of Fame. Songs by Summerbell have been included in several popular compilations of music by gay musicians. He has also written contemporary lyrics for the Huron Carol.

== Books ==
- Identifying Filamentous Fungi, G. St. Germain & R. C. Summerbell, Star Publishing, Belmont CA, 1995, ISBN 978-0-89863-177-7
- Champignons Filamenteux D'Interêt Medical, G. St. Germain & R.C. Summerbell, Star Publishing, Belmont CA, 1995, ISBN 978-0-89863-179-1
- Laboratory Handbook of Dermatophytes, J. Kane, R. C. Summerbell, et al., Star Publishing, Belmont CA, 1996, ISBN 978-0-89863-157-9
- Abnormally Happy: A Gay Dictionary, Richard Summerbell, New Star Books, Vancouver BC, 1985, ISBN 978-0-919573-41-3
