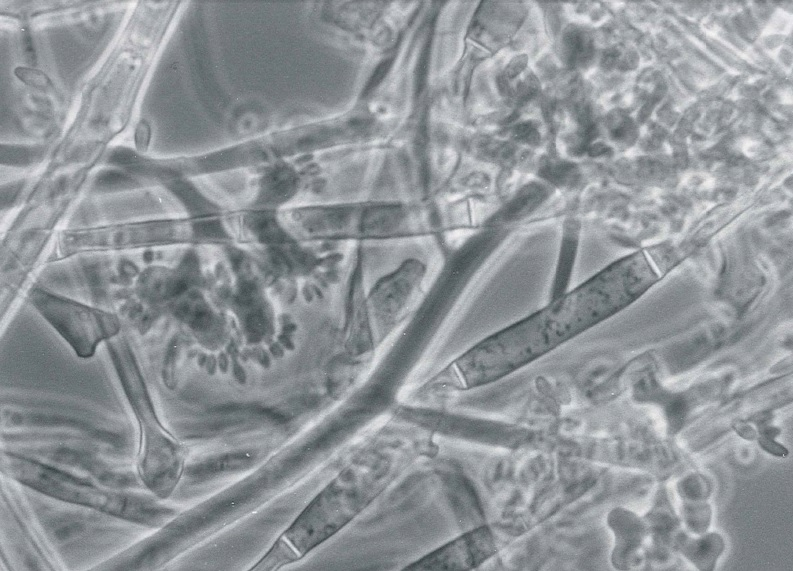

Scientific classification
- Kingdom: Fungi
- Division: Ascomycota
- Class: Sordariomycetes
- Order: Hypocreales
- Genus: Botryosporium
- Species: B. longibrachiatum

Binomial name
- Botryosporium longibrachiatum Maire, R. (1903)

Synonyms
- Botrytis longibrachiata Oudem. Maire, R. (1890)

= Botryosporium longibrachiatum =

Species of fungus

Botryosporium longibrachiatum is a fungus in the genus Botryosporium. It was mainly found on plant stems and leaves especially those grow in greenhouses or in similar environments. The colonies are white and hairy, form hoar-frost on affected plants. Botryosporium longibrachiatum causes diseases in plant species including sea-lavender, burley tobacco and sweet basil. The disease was not commonly occurred and the treatment was poorly studied.

== History and taxonomy ==
The species Botryosporium longibrachiatum was first identified by Marie R. in 1890 and first published on the peer-reviewed journal Annales Mycologici in 1903. It is a species of Botryosporium Corda and has other 2 varieties: Botryopsorium longibrachiatum var. macrospora and Botryopsorium longibrachiatum var. macrosporum. Both varieties were described based on spore size and name type by Sharma N.D. in 1978. There were 17 georeferenced records of Botryosporium longibrachiatum which were distributed in Bihar, Great Britain, Karnataka, Pakistan, Sierra Leone, Western Australia, etc.

== Morphology ==
Colonies are hairy, non-pigmented and extensive with a pure white color. The main body of conidiophores are long branched and bear lateral. The side branches grow indeterminate with a clavate shape that is narrower at the attachment to the main body and broader at the tip. Up to six ampullaes can bear on one tip at the same time. The size of the conidia is 8-11μm long and 4-4.5 wide which forms an ellipsoid shape.

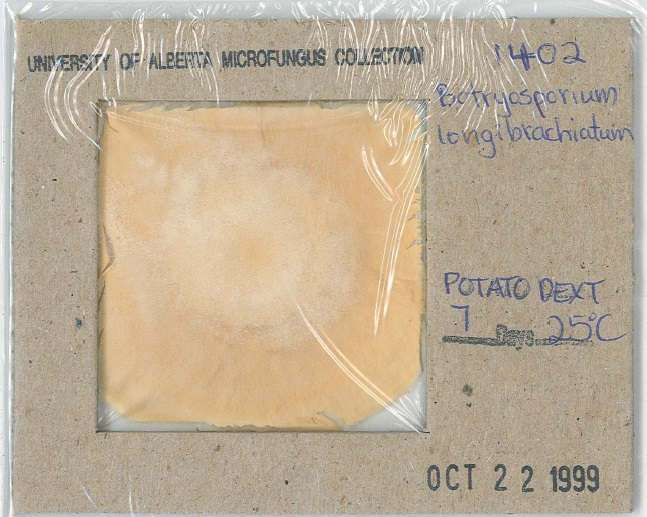
Dried colony of Botryotrichum longibrachiatum grown on Potato Dextrose Agar at 25 C for 7 days

== Habitat and ecology ==
Botryosporium longibrachiatum was largely recorded to grow on dead leaves and stems. It was also found on twine that was used in greenhouses to support plant growth such as tomatoes and eggplants. In general, the genus Botryosporium was rarely discovered from soil and there was only one record of Botryosporium in Ontario by 1968. Another possible place for Botryosporium to appear is above the potting soil in greenhouses. Several evidences have shown that the fungus favors cool and humid environment especially places like greenhouses.

== Disease in plants ==
In 2013, Botryosporium longibrachiatum was found to cause diseases in sea-lavender that grew in polyethylene-film-covered greenhouses as a commercial cut flower in Gochang County, Korea. The stems of affected plants turned into a dark brown color and were covered with the fungus Botryosporium longibrachiatum which looks like hoar frost. Other plant species including burley tobacco and sweet basil were also affected by this fungus.

=== Pathogenicity test ===
Isolated specimen was submitted to Korea University Herbarium for further studies. Koch’s postulates was used to test the pathogenicity of Botryosporium longibrachiatum. The fungal DNA was first isolated from B. longibrachiatum then the internal transcribed spacer region of rDNA was amplified with ITS1/ITS4 primers. After sequencing, a BLAST search identified ≥99% ITS sequence of the fungus from sweet basil. Then five treatment plants were set to be transferred the colonized mycelial agar individually and five control plants got non-colonized agar. All experimental plants were incubated under the same condition similar to those in the greenhouses for 3 to4 days. The result was that the symptoms were observed on treatment plants but not control plants. Lastly the fungus was re-isolated from the affected treatment plants to fulfill Koch’s postulates.
