= Fresia (surname) =

Fresia is a surname. Notable people with the surname include:

- Attilio Fresia (1891–1923), Italian footballer
- Vincenzo Fresia (1888–1946), Italian footballer and manager

== See also ==
- Fresa
- Fresia (disambiguation)
