= Friesia =

Friesia may refer to:

- Croton (plant), a genus of the flowering plant family Euphorbiaceae (synonym by authority: Spreng.)
- Parodia, a genus of the cactus family Cactaceae (synonym by authority: Fric (nom. inval.))
- Friesia (journal), a scientific journal concerned with mycology, see list of mycology journals
- Friesia (moth), a synonym of the moth genus Prosoparia of the family Erebidae

== See also ==
- Frisia, a region along the Dutch-German-Danish coast
- Freesia, a genus of flowering plants
- Friesea, a genus of springtails
- Fresia (disambiguation)
