= Ice nativity scene (Graz) =

Advent ice sculpture in Graz

Coordinates: 47.069816°N 15.439413°E

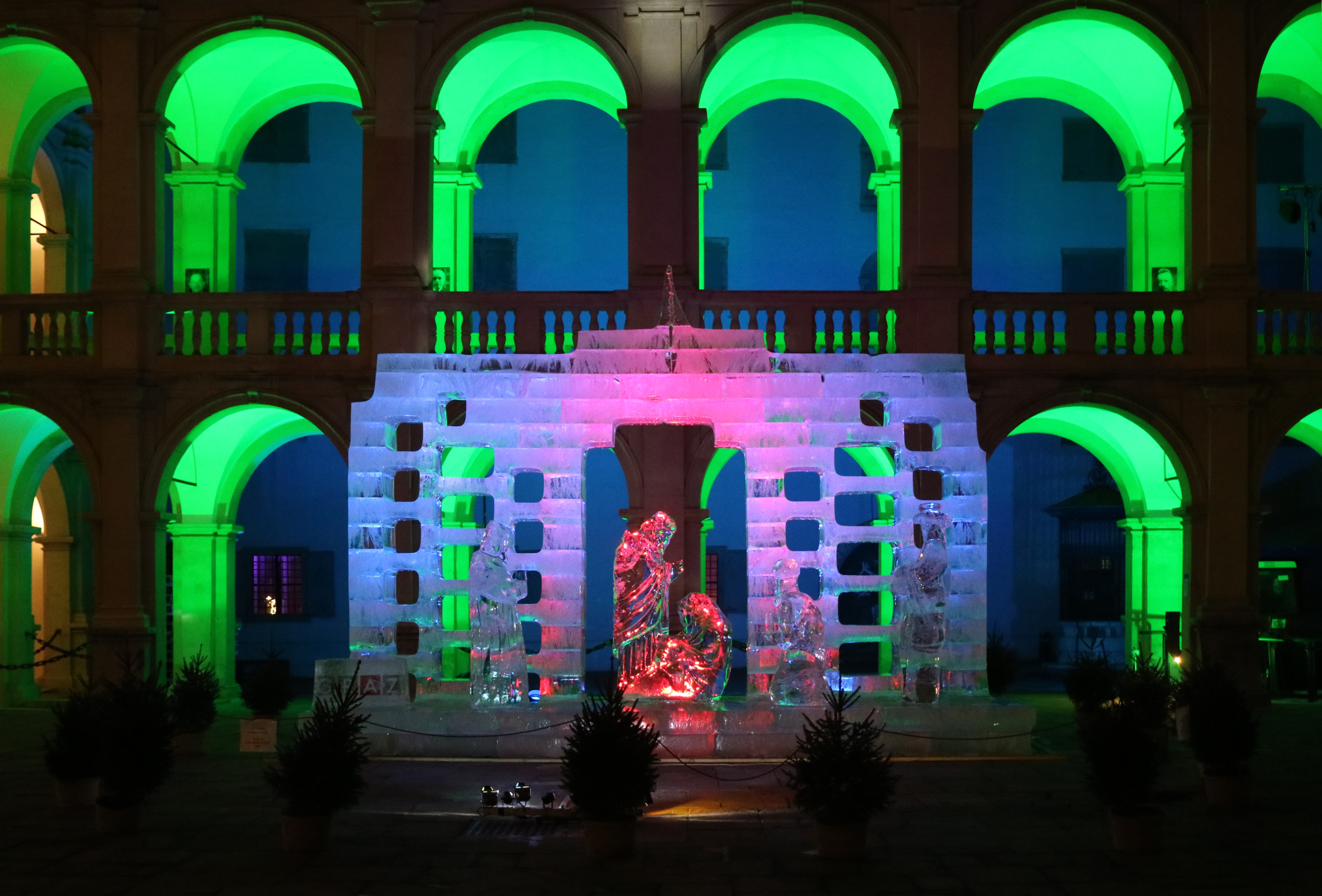
Ice nativity scene on 18 December 2017

The ice nativity scene (German Eiskrippe) is an ice sculpture exhibited annually in the Landhaus courtyard in Graz, Austria, during Advent time. The project of a nativity scene made of glaze ice has been a highlight in the town's Advent scene since 1996 and receives international media attention.

== History ==
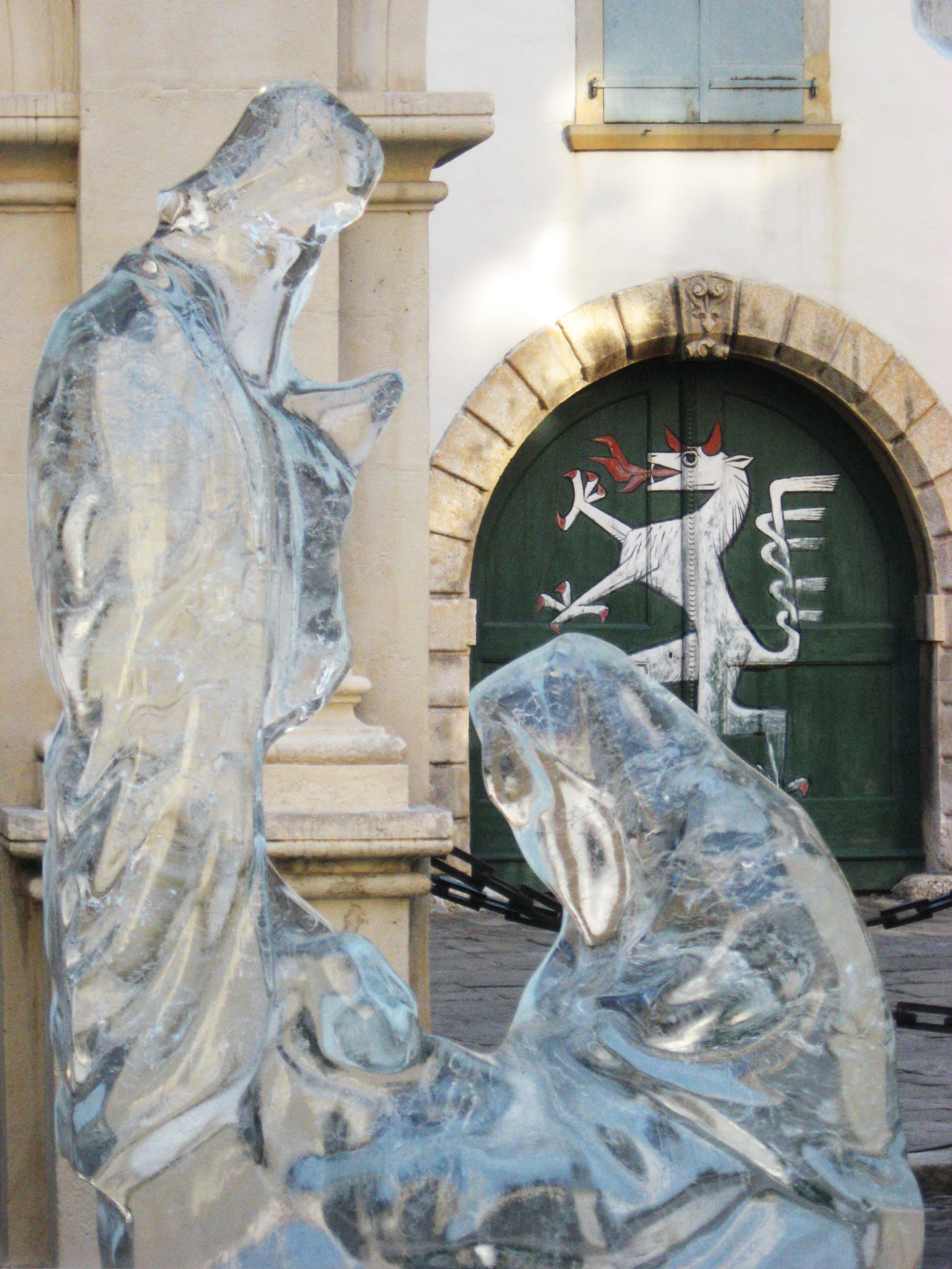
Ice nativity scene 2011 (detail)

The first ice nativity scene was modelled in 1996 on behalf of the Graz tourist association. The renowned Villach ice artist Gert J. Hödl (1943–2017) who had already succeeded in Canada, Russia, Norway and Japan came on board for the artistic direction. After two years of planning Hödl alongside four employees carved an ice nativity scene out of 156 blocks with a total weight of 23 tons, a global first. The Landhaus in the city centre was chosen as exhibition site for artwork with life-sized characters. The complete installation was eight meters wide by four meters high.

The tourist association kept the project alive for the following years and was first able to provide online live pictures in 1998. Since its first installation the nativity scene is sculpted in late November or early December and revealed in a solemn ceremony. In the evening hours the ice nativity scene and the Arcade halls of the Landhaus are colorfully illuminated.

To ensure increased durability, bigger blocks were first used in 2003, the year Graz was the European Capital of Culture, and the ice weight rose to 45 tons. The ice also showed a greenish hue for the first time. As a tribute to a famous son of Graz, Arnold Schwarzenegger, who had been elected Governor of California shortly before, Hödl put a bear – the Californian heraldic animal – in the background of the Holy Family, an action that greatly enhanced international media interest. Other actions aimed at slowing down the melting process include a more "monumental construction" first implemented in 2004 which is supposed to generate an ice house effect. Several sets of characters are stored in an ice house near Graz in case they are required as replacements.

Since 2014, Finnish ice artist Kimmo Frosti is responsible for the artistic design of the ice nativity scene. With support from a five-man team and liquid nitrogen, it takes him about a week to complete the work. The components are then arranged with the help of a forklift. The ice nativity scene has generated international attention since its first installment. As of 2016, coverage was provided on more than 200 international TV channels and newspapers. Press agencies like The Huffington Post and Reuters reported on the project.

== Controversy ==
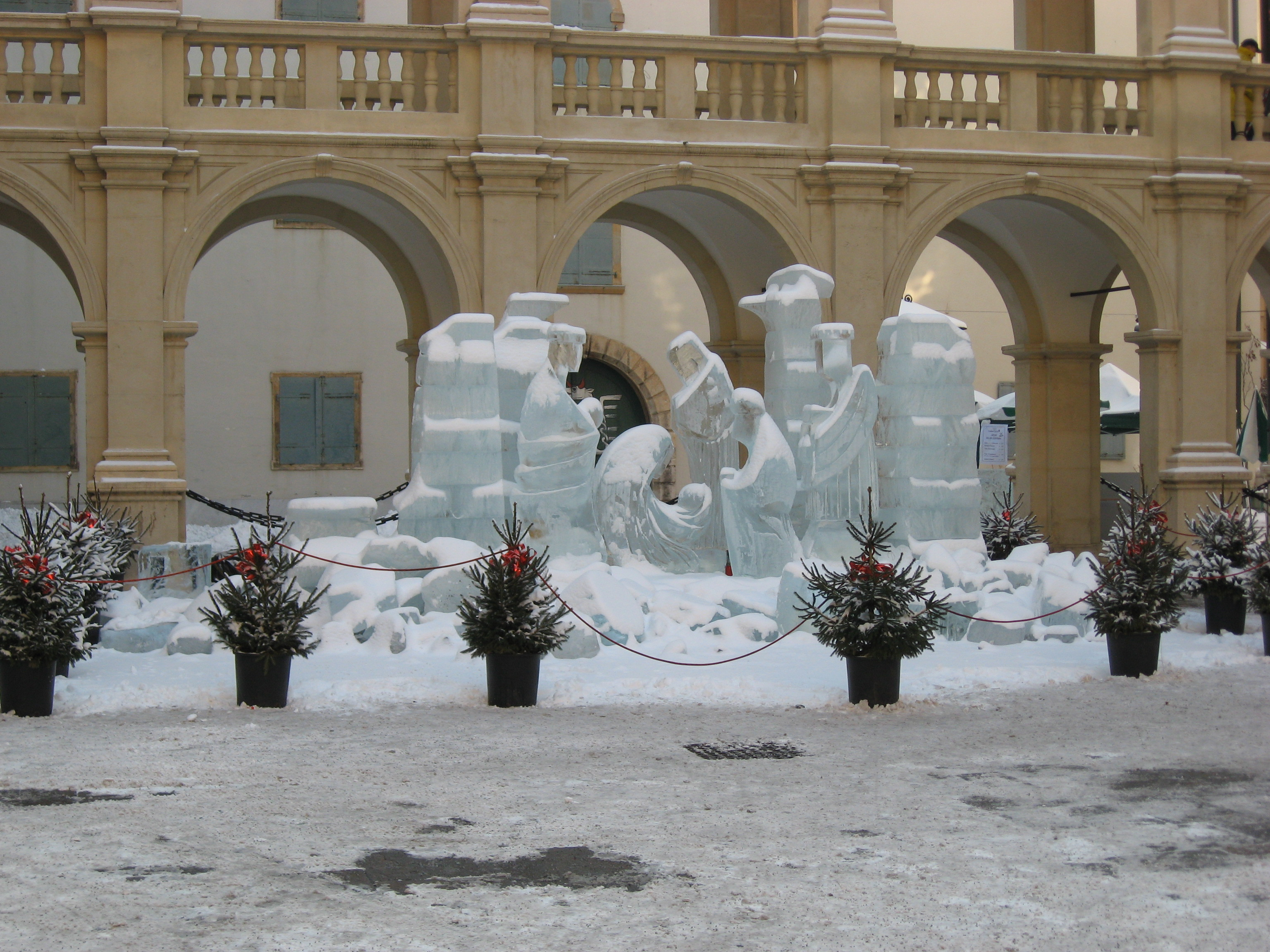
Collapsed artwork 2009

Despite its value as a tourist attraction there has been debate over the meaningfulness of the ice nativity scene. At warmer temperatures the construction does not always survive throughout the entirety of Advent. In 2002, the sculpture collapsed before being even opened to the public, and had to be saved by the artist with night work. In 2006, and 2009, the nativity scene did not endure the warm weather and crumpled before Christmas. A local politician of the Green Party cynically noted:

"Due to global warming, Advent will become ever milder. This raises the question of whether the city of Graz should continue to invest more than 40,000 € in a pool of water."

Suggestions to cancel the project have been turned down by the tourist association who argued that the ice nativity scene rendered the economically important Graz Advent an "unmistakable" event. The Tiroler Tageszeitung made tongue-in-cheek claims about yearly bets of Graz citizens on the ice nativity scene's endurance. A planned wood roof to protect the artwork from rain was vetoed in 1999 through intervention of the Federal Monuments Office because it would disturb the ambience of the Renaissance architecture. In the same year there was a conflict of interest with a movie event that wished to keep equipment in place, which nearly prevented the popular artwork's construction.

== Artistic direction ==
- 1996–2013: Gert J. Hödl (Austria)
- since 2014: Kimmo Frosti (Finland)
