= Raul Cano (scientist) =

Microbiologist

Raul Cano is a microbiologist and medical mycologist, Professor Emeritus at the biology department at California Polytechnic State University, San Luis Obispo, California. His claim to fame is having revived microorganisms from amber alongside entomologist George Poinar Jr. This work was published in the peer-reviewed journal Science in 1995, describing the revival and identification of a 25- to 40-million-year-old bacterial spore recovered from the digestive tract of a bee preserved in Dominican amber. Initially, a company was founded to promote medical uses of the microorganisms, which proved unsuccessful.

Cano was the first author of a 1993 paper in Nature reporting the extraction, amplification, and sequencing of DNA from a 120–135-million-year-old weevil found in Lebanese amber.

In 2008, he co-founded Fossil Fuels Brewing Company. Cano claims that their beer is brewed with "ancient yeast" that he extracted from amber and revived after 25 million to 45 million years. The process used to extract the yeast is similar to the process described in the book Jurassic Park that was used to retrieve dinosaur blood from mosquitos trapped in amber. The beer has received mixed reviews, with critics noting that it has a unique taste. The company has since closed.

== Later career and honors ==
In May 2024, Cano was inducted into the Cuban Academy of Sciences, becoming the first Cuban-American scientist to receive the honor. Cano, who emigrated from Cuba to the United States in 1962 at age 16, returned to Cuba in 2020 to collaborate with Clinical Hospital Hermanos Ameijeiras in Havana, where a clinical trial began in June 2022. In 2023, Cano co-authored a published randomized clinical trial investigating a probiotic intervention for the management of type 2 diabetes mellitus.
