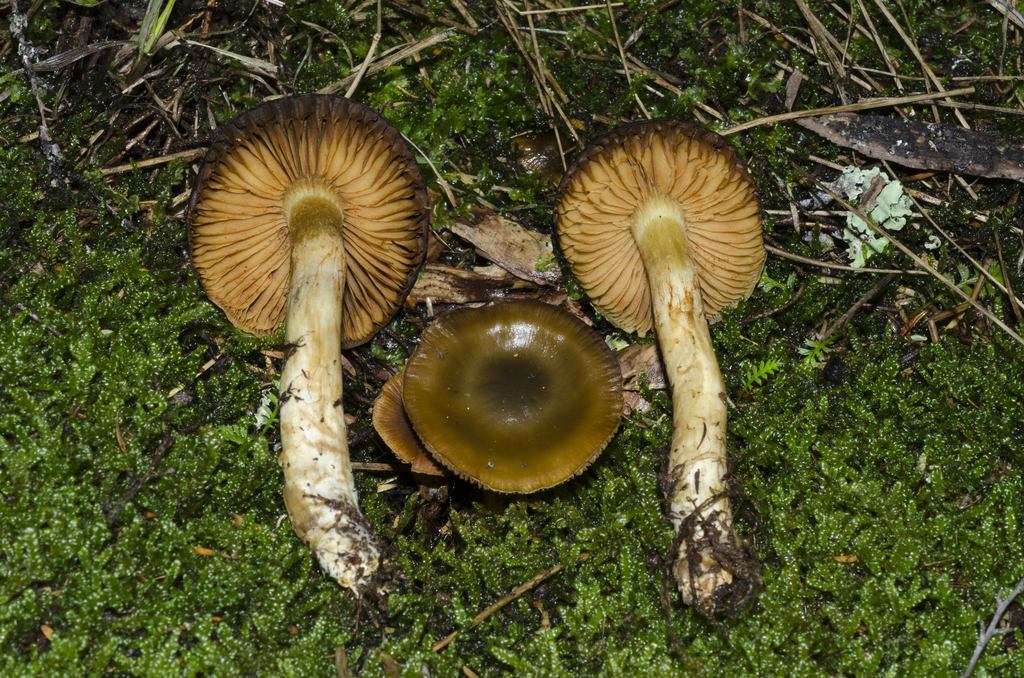
- Fruiting bodies from Eyrewell Scientific Reserve, CA, NZ.

Scientific classification
- Kingdom: Fungi
- Division: Basidiomycota
- Class: Agaricomycetes
- Order: Agaricales
- Family: Cortinariaceae
- Genus: Cortinarius
- Species: C. alienatus

Binomial name
- Cortinarius alienatus (E. Horak) G. Garnier

Synonyms
- Dermocybe alienata E. Horak

= Cortinarius alienatus =

Species of fungus

Cortinarius alienatus is a species in the genus Cortinarius that grows on soil in southern beech (Nothofagus) and myrtaceous forests in New Zealand. It is endemic to New Zealand.

== Taxonomy ==
Cortinarius alienatus was first described in the scientific journal Sydowia as Dermocybe alienata by Egon Horak in 1987. In 1991, Gaston Garnier reclassified the species in the genus Cortinarius as Cortinarius alienatus. This decision has been supported by phylogenetic evidence that shows Cortinarius alienatus is not within the Dermocybe section of Cortinarius.

Aliēnātus is a perfect passive participle of aliēnō in Latin, which means to alienate of make foreign. Aliēnāta is the feminine singular of aliēnātus.

== Description ==
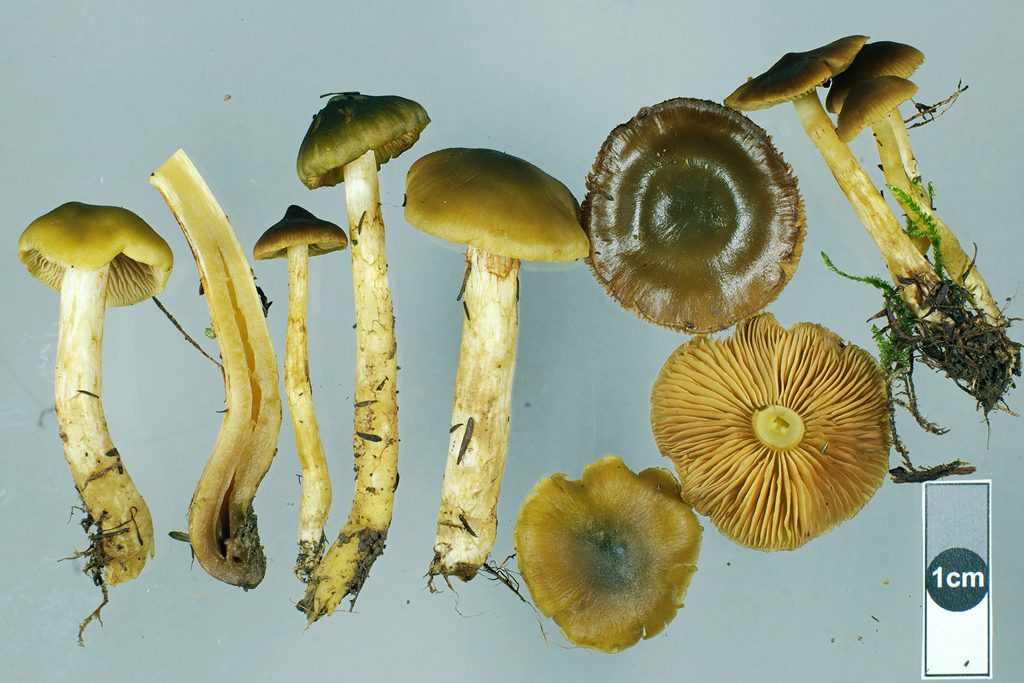
Laboratory photos from Eyrewell Scientific Reserve, CA, NZ

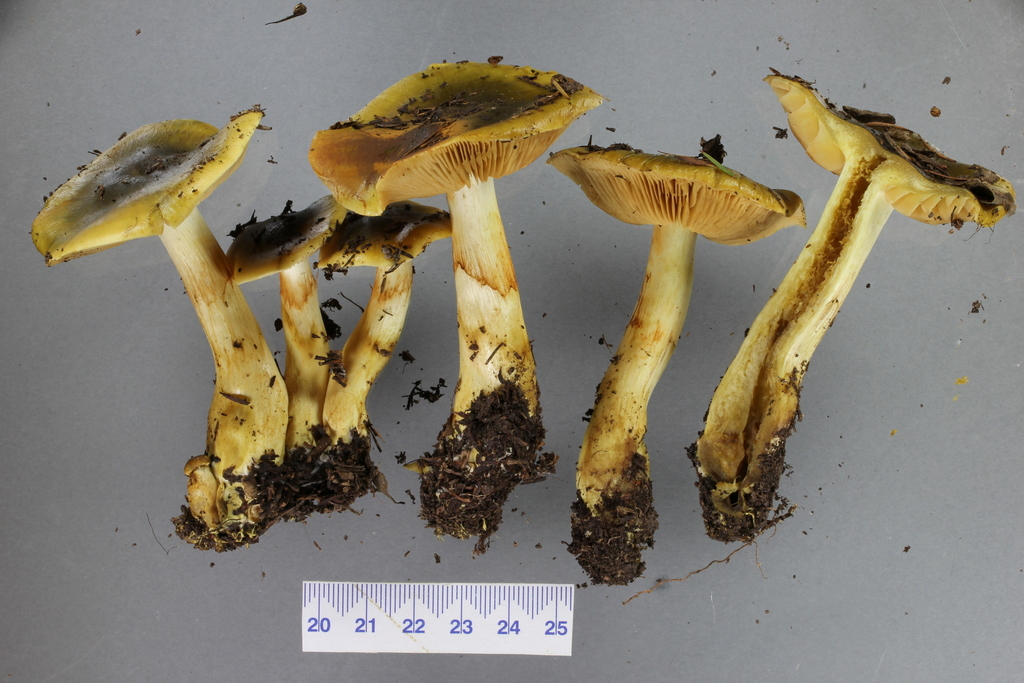
Laboratory photos from Fringed Hill, Nelson, New Zealand

Cortinarius alienatus can have hemispherical caps, or caps which are convex that become broadly umbonate, often with a slimy or glutinous texture. Cap diameter of Cortinarius alienatus is 20–70 mm (0.8–2.8 in). Cap colour tends to be olivaceous but can vary between olive-yellow and olive-grey. The cap commonly has a darker olive-brown, olive-green, or even blackish disk at the centre. The outer edge of the cap is a paler olive-tan colour. The cap is not hygrophanous and the colours do not fade significantly when dried. The gills of Cortinarius alienatus tend to be thick and yellow-green to citrinous in colour, the same colour as the internal flesh. The flesh bruises brown and has a faintly raphanoid odour. The stipe is also yellow to citrinous or grey-citrinous in colour, covered in a texture resembling small thread-like fibres. The veil of Cortinarius alienatus appears sparsely and is slimy or glutinous in texture and yellow-green to olive-brown in colour.

=== Spores ===
The spore print of Cortinarius alienatus is rust brown. The spores are oval or elliptic in shape, and covered in course warts at the apex.

=== Chemical reactions ===
NaOH causes colour change from orange to red on the flesh of the cap, gills, and stipe.

=== Similar species ===
Cortinarius olivaceoniger is a similar species and has similar spores, though it is slender with more yellow components. It grows in the same habitats but is rare. Definitive identification may be hard in the field due to similar spores and features. However, species can be distinguished through DNA sequencing or chromatography of the anthra-quinonoid pigments.

== Ecology and habitat ==
Cortinarius alienatus is a common ectomycorrhizal species that grows on soil substrate in southern beech (Nothofagus) and myrtaceous forests in New Zealand.

== See also ==
- List of Cortinarius species
