= Mycological Society of Japan =

Professional organization of mycologists

The Mycological Society of Japan (MSJ) is a learned society that serves as the professional organization of mycologists in Japan. It was founded in 1956. Members of the MSJ meet annually to exchange information and build understanding of fungi.

== Publications ==
Mycoscience is the official scholarly journal of the Mycological Society of Japan. Six issues are published each year. Both members and non-members are invited to submit scholarly manuscripts for publication.

== See also ==
- International Mycological Association
