= Yeast (disambiguation) =

A yeast is a eukaryotic and single-celled microorganism.

Yeast may also refer to:

- Baker's yeast, yeast used as a leavening agent in baking
- Yeast extract, food product from processed yeast
- Yeast (novel), aka Yeast: A Problem, an 1848 novel by Charles Kingsley
- Yeast (journal), a monthly peer-reviewed scientific journal
- Yeast (wine), the role of yeast in winemaking
