= International Journal of Medicinal Mushrooms =

- Discipline: Mycology
- Language: English
- Edited by: Solomon P. Wasser

Publication details
- History: Since 1999
- Publisher: Begell House
- Frequency: Monthly
- Impact factor: 1.4 (2024)

Standard abbreviations
- ISO 4: Int. J. Med. Mushrooms

Indexing
- ISSN: 1521-9437 (print); 1940-4344 (web)
- LCCN: sn98001301
- OCLC no.: 882906412

Links
- Journal homepage

The International Journal of Medicinal Mushrooms covers research on medicinal mushrooms, including systematics, nomenclature, taxonomy, morphology, medicinal value, biotechnology, and more. It was established in 1999.

The journal exhibited unusual levels of self-citation and its impact factor of 2019 was suspended from the Journal Citation Reports in 2020.

According to the Journal Citation Reports, the journal has a 2024 impact factor of 1.4.
