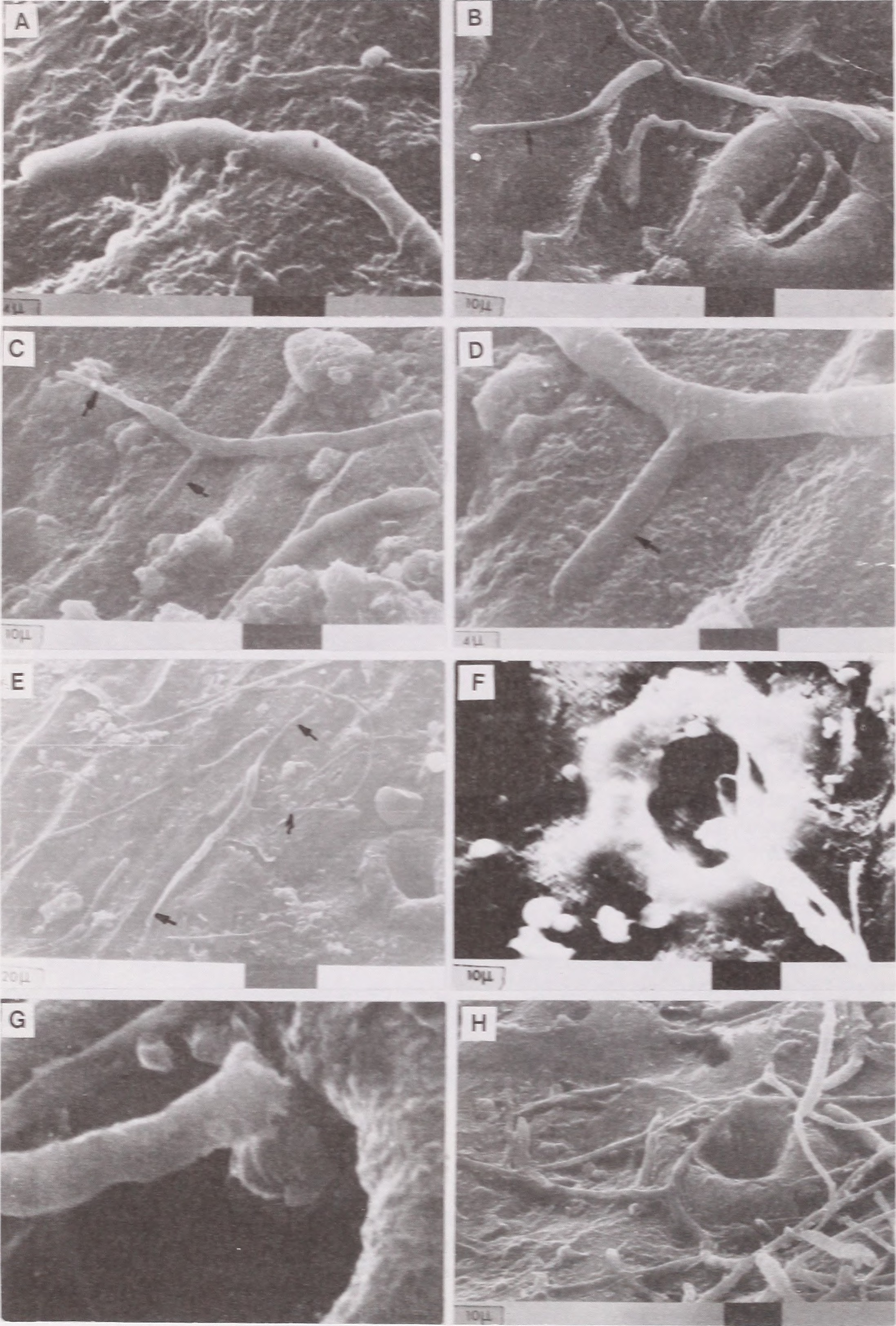
- Dothistroma septosporum. A. Conidium of the fungus on an Austrian pine needle. B.C.D.E. Germinating conidia. F. Direct penetration of the germ tube through a stoma. G. Appressorium-like structure formed in the antestomatal chamber. H. Secondary conidia developing on mycelium on the surface of the needle.

Scientific classification
- Domain: Eukaryota
- Kingdom: Fungi
- Division: Ascomycota
- Class: Dothideomycetes
- Order: Capnodiales
- Family: Mycosphaerellaceae
- Genus: Dothistroma; Hulbary, 1941

= Dothistroma =

Genus of fungi

Dothistroma is a genus of fungi belonging to the family Mycosphaerellaceae.

The genus has almost cosmopolitan distribution.

Species:

- Dothistroma flichianum (Vuill.) M.Morelet
- Dothistroma pini Hulbary
- Dothistroma septosporum (Dorogin) M.Morelet
