= Verlag Ferdinand Berger & Söhne =

Austrian publisher and printing company

Verlag Ferdinand Berger & Söhne Ges.m.b.H.
- Status: Active
- Founded: 1868
- Founder: Ferdinand Berger
- Country of origin: Austria
- Headquarters location: Horn
- Key people: Elisabeth Hübl
- Publication types: books, e-books, scientific journals.
- No. of employees: 250
- Official website: www.verlag-berger.at

Ferdinand Berger is an Austrian publisher and printing company based in Horn, Lower Austria.

== History ==
The publishing house and printing company was founded in 1868, initially limited to local newspapers and printing. From 1920, the publication list expanded into literature, history, fiction and poetry. Today, the publisher Ferdinand Berger publishes across Europe and employs about 250 people.

In addition to publishing various authors, the company is also publisher for the Austrian Federal Monuments Office, as the Austrian publisher of the encyclopedic manual of artistic monuments, the Dehio-Handbuch first established by Georg Dehio.

== Authors ==
Over the decades, the company have published numerous authors, including

- Vladimir Aichelburg (1945)
- Gerhard Blaboll (1958)
- Chaloupek Ferdinand (1900-1988)
- Joachim Dalfen (1936)
- Felix Ermacora (1923-1995)
- Rupert Feuchtmüller (1920-2010)
- Werner Gamerith (1939)
- Mario R. Lackner (1978)
- Gerhard Petermann (1942)
- Josef Pointner (1920)

== Publications ==
The company publish books, e-books and several academic journals, both German and English language. The former include Mitteilungen der Anthropologischen Gesellschaft (Communications of the Anthropological Society of Germany) and the latter include Phyton - Annales Rai Botanicae and Sydowia.
