= Forest integrated pest management =

Pest control method

Forest integrated pest management or forest IPM is the practice of monitoring and managing pest and environmental information with pest control methods to prevent pest damage to forests and forest habitats by the most economical means.

== Application ==
Forest IPM practices vary from region to region and particularly by state, according to the habitat and forests present. Forest integrated pest management or Forest IPM combines cultural, biological and chemical technologies to reduce pest damage to levels below those that of economic damage. Forest IPM is utilized for the whole life of the tree, from site prep to harvest. An IPM treatment is utilized before the cost of the treatment is equal to the reduction in crop value due to past injury, which is called the economic injury level. Forest integrated pest management has a strong emphasis on intensive forest management.

The main components of forest integrated pest management are how pest populations change over time, forest stand susceptibility and resistance to pests, pest impact on crop value, and control strategies. Forest IPM is designed to provide the information needed to deal with multiple pest problems in a way that promotes forest management objectives.

In the state of Vermont, two common pests are of particular significance, the Hemlock Woolly Adelgid or HWA, and thrips.

== Practices ==
=== Preventive ===
Preventive practices of forest integrated pest management include training, detection, diagnosis and evaluation and exclusion. These are actions that can be done to prevent pest infestations from reaching levels of concern. Training employees to find early signs of pest occurrence will help landowners find and remove infected trees before the infestation spreads. Cleaning equipment before moving to different stands and when first brought onto the property will remove any contaminates that could affect the forest.

=== Cultural ===
Intensive forest management can be described as the cultural practices in forest integrated pest management. Cultural practices are done during the growth of the crop trees and also in the form of site prep and harvest practices. These practices range from choosing a good site with adequate drainage to the having an appropriate tree per acer (TPA). Seedling density is very important in tree nurseries. Having seedlings with a too high density promotes foliage disease fungi since airflow is reduced. The seedlings will also have more competition between themselves with a higher density, and this will reduce the quality of each seedling. The recommended density for longleaf pine is 50–90 per square meter and loblolly and slash pine at less than 215 seedlings per square meter.

=== Biological ===
The act of releasing native or nonnative predators of pest species is uncommon in forest integrated pest management. It would not be economically feasible to utilize this method in a forestry scenario. Instead, the forest and its surrounding area is managed in a way to promote natural enemies of pest species. In a study of eucalyptus plantations in Brazil, the closer the plantation is to a "natural" more diverse forest, the more diverse and balanced the insect populations are. This more diverse environment is less likely for produce an outbreak of pest species. Bacillus thuringiensis (Bt) is a bacterium that is used to kill larvae of many pest species. This can be applied aerially or on the ground over large surfaces. Bt is safe for humans and other wildlife since it only infects certain species of insects.

=== Chemical ===
Integrated pest management was designed after Rachael Carson's Silent Spring as a way to manage for pests without overusing pesticides. Chemicals are still used but in a way that focuses on proper use of pesticide application so overuse does not occur. The fungicide triadimefon is applied to loblolly and slash pine seeds to prevent fusiform rust. If the seeds used are not treated for fusiform rust, the stand can lose 1–30% of their trees to the rust. Longleaf pine is naturally resistant to fusiform rust so their seeds are not treated with triadimefon. Southern pine nurseries fumigate the soil every four years and hardwood nurseries fumigate yearly. Fumigation promotes growth of beneficial fungus Trichoderma and less of the harmful Phythium fungus. In forest integrated pest management, insecticides are not applied until an infestation is observed. Herbicides are used to control weeds in nurseries. Low rates and frequent application intervals of herbicide is what is recommended.

== Eucalyptus plantations ==
Eucalyptus plantations provide a unique management challenge since they are commonly grown out of their native range and also in monocultures of clones. Large homogeneous areas of one species of tree are more susceptible of pest attacks. This is due to an abundant and predictable amount of food for the pest, and an absence of their natural enemies. There are less predator species in monocultures because the plants they need to forage, rest and lay eggs on are not there. This combination is why monoculture environments favor certain species and amplify their numbers to pest levels.

The biggest pest concern with eucalyptus plantations in Brazil, for example, are leaf-cutting ants and Lepidopteran (moth and butterfly) defoliators. Leaf-cutting ants contribute the most damage to these plantations. The insecticide methyl bromide is needed to fight leaf-cutting ants, with application done within a month of planting. Periodic applications during the rest of the rotation may be necessary. Monitoring leaf-cutting ant activity is crucial in eucalyptus plantations. Keeping a vegetative understory can also lower leaf-cutting ant numbers. Lepidoptera larvae can be controlled with Bt application. Using a tractor is a more efficient than aerially applying Bt since the canopy is so closed and the Bt needs to reach the ground where the larvae are. Traps are used to monitor larva levels to help better manage for them.

== See also ==
- Biological pest control
- Forest pathology
- Integrated pest management
