= Botryosporium pulchrum =

Scientific classification
- Domain: Eukaryota
- Kingdom: Fungi
- Division: Ascomycota
- Class: Sordariomycetes
- Order: Hypocreales
- Genus: Botryosporium
- Species: B. pulchrum

Binomial name
- Botryosporium pulchrum Corda (1840)

Synonyms
- Phymatotrichum pyramidale Bonord 1851; Cephalosporium elegans Bonorden 1851; Botryosporium elegans (Corda) Corda 1842

Species of fungus

Botryosporium pulchrum is an ascomycete fungus that is a plant pathogen. It was described by August Carl Joseph Corda in 1840. It causes leaf mold in geraniums.

== See also ==
- List of geranium diseases
