= Forest pathology =

Subfield of forestry and plant pathology

Forest pathology is a subfield of forestry and plant pathology that researches biotic and abiotic factors affecting the health of a forest ecosystem. This primarily deals with fungal pathogens and their insect vectors. Forest pathology is part of the broader approach towards forest protection.

== History ==
Forest pathology has its origins in Europe with Robert Hartig, who is considered the father of the discipline. Hartig wrote the first textbook in 1874; it was translated into English by Harry Marshall Ward in 1894. Hartig and Ward along with William Somerville went on to publish Text-book of the Diseases of Trees in 1894.

Forest pathology is the study of both biotic and abiotic maladies affecting the health of a forest ecosystem, primarily fungal pathogens and their insect vectors. It is a subfield of forestry and plant pathology.

As of 2015, insects, diseases and severe weather events damaged about 40 million hectares of forests, mainly in the temperate and boreal domains.

== Abiotic factors ==
Several abiotic factors affect the health of a forest, such as moisture issues like drought, waterlogging resulting from over-abundance or lack of rainfall.

Wind is an important abiotic factor as windthrow (the uprooting or breaking of trees due to high winds) causes direct loss of stability to trees.

Often, abiotic factors and biotic factors affect a forest at the same time. For example, if wind speed is 80 km per hour then many trees which have root rot (caused by a pathogen) are likely to be thrown. Higher wind speeds are necessary to damage healthier trees.

Fire, whether caused by humans or lightning, and related abiotic factors affect the health of forest.

The effects of man often alter a forest's predisposition to damage from both abiotic and biotic effects. For example, soil properties may be altered by heavy machinery.

Other abiotic factors

- Nutrient imbalances: deficiencies, chemicals (toxic salts, herbicides, air pollutants)
- Stemflow which can concentrate dry deposits which via soil acidification can kill surrounding plants.
- Temperature

== Biotic factors ==
Biotic factors include fungal pathogens and insect pests. These often act in concer. For example, Amylostereum areolatum is spread by the Sirex noctilio. The fungus gains access to new trees to live off, and the woodwasp larvae gain food.

Many plants can parasitize trees via root to root contact, especiallyl in tropical and subtropical climates.

== Animals ==
Nematodes, insects especially bark beetles, mammals may browse. Browsing can be prevented with tree shelters.

Humans and other mammals predate on trees. On an industrial scale, this is harmful to the forest. Poorly planned but conventionally replanted (post-cut) forest plantations are typically monocropped, and highly susceptible to further insect or fungal infection due to low biodiversity and diminished capacity for community resilience.

One aspect is forest entomology, which includes the study of all insects and arthropods, such as mites, centipedes and millipedes, which live in and interact in forest ecosystems. Forest entomology also includes the management of insect pests that cause the degrading, defoliation, crown die-back or death of trees.

Thus the scope is wide and includes:

- Documentation of all insect species and related arthropods in natural and man-made forests, and the study and ecology of those species.
- Description and assessment of damage to tree structures (parts of a tree), to forest stands, landscape effects and to wood products, timber in service and other ecosystem services.
- Eradication of recently introduced pests, or long-term management of established exotics and indigenous pests, to minimise losses in wood quality and wood production, and to reduce tree mortality.
- Assessments of forest operations, or of management impacts, on the invertebrate fauna, and the alleviation of any adverse effects on these invertebrates.

== Pathology detection ==
Forest pathology can be detected by machines or by dogs smelling the trees, or by monitoring.

The disease triangle is relevant to the evaluation of pathologies. Demonstration of suspected active agents can involve confirmation of Koch's postulates.

== See also ==
- Allelopathy
- Disturbance (ecology)
- Forest IPM
- Glossary of phytopathology
- Lists of invasive species
- Forest disturbance by invasive insects and diseases in the United States
- Plant disease epidemiology
- Robert Hartig
- Forest Pathology (journal)
- Sanitation harvest

== Sources ==
This article incorporates text from a free content work. Licensed under CC BY-SA 3.0 (license statement/permission). Text taken from Global Forest Resources Assessment 2020 Key findings, FAO, FAO.
