= Fresa =

Fresa may refer to:

- Fresa (slang), slang, socially used in Mexico and some parts of Latin America to describe a cultural stereotype of superficial youngsters
- Armando Fresa, (1893 - 1957), Italian politician and Civil Engineer Officer

== See also ==
- Fresia (disambiguation)
- Freisa
