= Denkmalgeschütztes Objekt =

Type of cultural heritage protection in Austria

Denkmalgeschütztes Objekt is a classification applied to protected objects listed on the Austrian cultural property list. This list is maintained by the Federal Monuments Office, known as the Bundesdenkmalamt (BDA).

The Austrian directory of "kulturdenkmal" objects is kept in accordance with the Austrian monument protection law of December 2007, which reported over 16,000 listed properties in Austria. The BDA estimates the total inventory to be about 60,000 objects, and the complete monument database was published in 2011. Approximately three-quarters of items in Austria are of a secular nature, such as castles and palaces and residential buildings; ten percent are religious buildings such as churches; and roughly about one-seventh are groups of monuments, such as museum collections, and archaeological sites and finds. In addition to the official list of physical monuments there is also a list of items of interest from the Austrian Dehio Handbook presented by the Department of Inventory and monument research (developed by the BDA).

"Denkmalgeschütztes Objekt" according to state (AT=national level), 2007
Type of Object	AT	BGL	KTN	NOE	OOE	SBG	STM	TIR	VBG	WIE
All Objects	36,363; 16,678	1,972; 1,042	2,687; 1,243	10,056; 4,424	5,536; 2,901	2,138; 1,329	4,690; 1,621	4,676; 1,838	1,476; 566	3,132; 1,472
Archeology	2,330	239	166	1,109	205	95	488	25	1	2
Construction features	113	6	3	19	18	6	9	22	2	28
Movable heritage	242	NA	NA	NA	NA	NA	NA	NA	NA	NA
Individual buildings	17	2	2	4	4	1	3	1	0	0
Gardens and parks	25	2	4	5	4	2	1	2	1	4
Horticultural Monuments	115	9	3	22	11	10	10	13	4	33
Secular Buildings	12,239	699	968	2,924	2,413	1,121	932	1,450	471	1,261
Sacred buildings	1,384	77	91	305	214	86	144	313	81	73
Collections	121	8	1	10	9	8	20	5	3	57
Technical monuments	92	0	5	26	23	0	14	7	3	14
