= Botryosporium =

Scientific classification
- Kingdom: Fungi
- Division: Ascomycota
- Class: Sordariomycetes
- Order: Hypocreales
- Genus: Botryosporium; Corda

Synonyms
- Peylia Opiz, 1857

Genus of fungi

Botryosporium is a genus of fungi belonging to the order Hypocreales, family unknown.

The genus has cosmopolitan distribution.

== Species ==
As accepedted by GBIF:

- Botryosporium diffusum Corda
- Botryosporium elegans (Corda) Corda
- Botryosporium erumpens Schwein.
- Botryosporium hamatum Bonord.
- Botryosporium hughesii Vincent & W.H.Blackw.
- Botryosporium indicum Tilak
- Botryosporium leucostachys Zopf
- Botryosporium longibrachiatum (Oudem.) Maire
- Botryosporium madrasense Raghuk.
- Botryosporium magnum Subram. & Sudha
- Botryosporium palmicola Speg.
- Botryosporium peristrophes R.R.Yadav & Dayal
- Botryosporium pulchellum Maire, 1900
- Botryosporium pulchrum Corda
- Botryosporium pyramidale Costantin
- Botryosporium sholayarense V.G.Rao & Varghese
