= Mycological Progress =

- Discipline: Mycology
- Language: English
- Edited by: [Marco Thines]

Publication details
- History: 2002–present
- Publisher: Springer Nature
- Frequency: Continuous
- Open access: Hybrid
- Impact factor: 2.538 (2021)

Standard abbreviations
- ISO 4: Mycol. Prog.

Indexing
- ISSN: 1617-416X (print); 1861-8952 (web)
- OCLC no.: 67618445

Links
- Journal homepage; Online access

Mycological Progress is a peer-reviewed scientific journal covering the study of fungi including lichens. It is published by Springer Science+Business Media on behalf of the German Mycological Society. Its editor in chief is Marco Thines.

== History ==
The journal was established in February 2002 by the German Mycological Society under founding editor-in-chief, Franz Oberwinkler (University of Tübingen). The current editor-in-chief is Marco Thines, who is also the president of the German Mycological Society. Originally published by botanical publisher, IHW-Verlag (Eching), the title transferred to Springer in 2006 by which time it was the official journal of ten European national mycological societies. It was published quarterly until 2015 when it converted to continuous publication online and production of the printed version ceased.

== Abstracting and indexing ==
The journal is abstracted and indexed in:

- AGRICOLA
- BIOSIS Previews
- Scopus
- Science Citation Index Expanded
- CAB Abstracts
- Current Contents/Agriculture, Biology & Environmental Sciences
- Elsevier Biobase
- EMBiology
- The Zoological Record

According to the Journal Citation Reports, the journal has a 2018 impact factor of 2.0.
