= Federal Monuments Office =

Austrian Federal Monuments Office

Coordinates: 48.2075°N 16.3665°E

logo

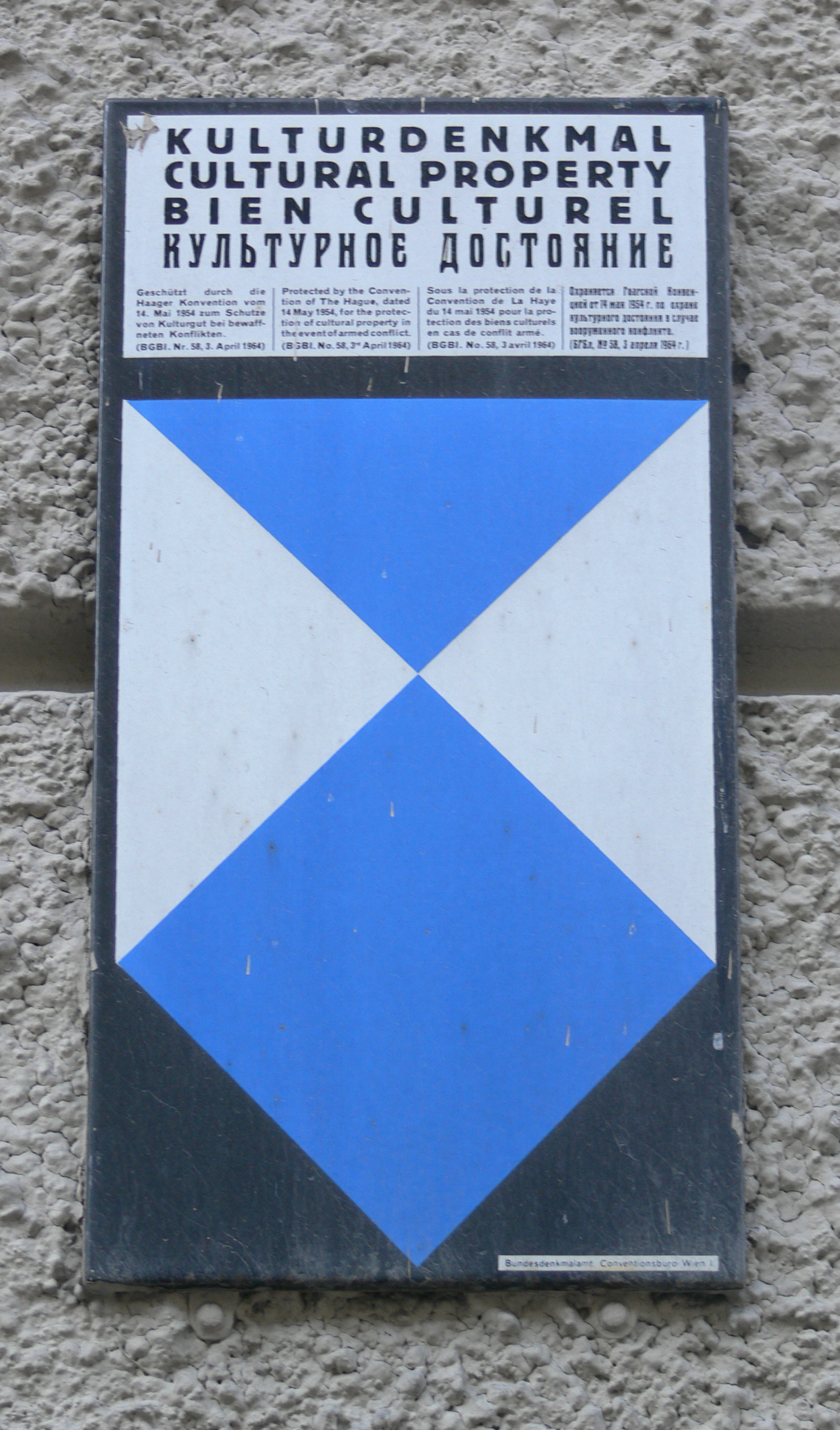
Bundesdenkmalamt plaque on a building in Salzburg indicating "Cultural property" in four languages: German: Kulturdenkmal, English: Cultural Property, French: Bien culturel, and Russian: 'Культурное Достояние.

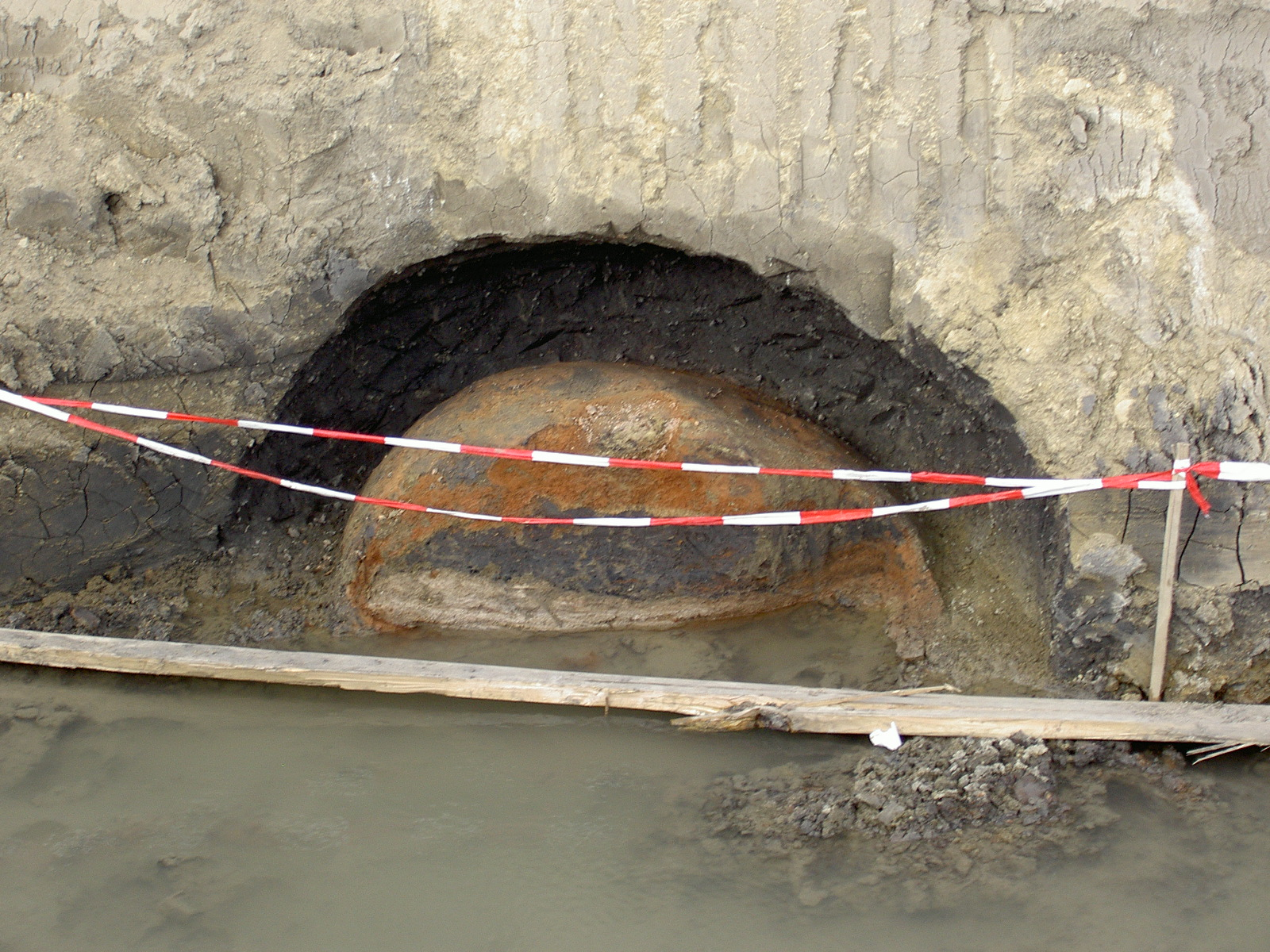
Early medieval oven, uncovered during excavations in Gaweinstal by the Bundesdenkmalamt.

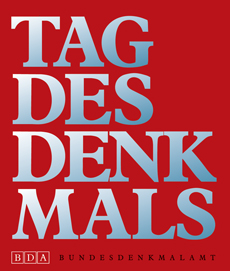
Poster for the Tag des Denkmals, the Austrian version of the European Heritage Days, sponsored by the Bundesdenkmalamt.

The Federal Monuments Office (BDA; German: Bundesdenkmalamt) is a department of the Federal Chancellery responsible for cultural heritage in Austria.

== History ==
The BDA was established in 1853 under Emperor Franz Joseph I, as a central commission for the preservation of National Heritage Sites. Its duties include the preservation, restoration and cataloging of immoveable cultural heritage. The BDA also monitors the export provisions of the Austrian monument protection act for moveable cultural heritage. The BDA is divided into one central bureau and nine "land conservation districts" in the provincial capitals. At their disposal are the following central departments:

- Historic buildings
- Garden architecture (Historic garden conservation and historic parks)
- Restored workshops Baudenkmalpflege
- Industrial heritage (historic factories)
- Export licenses for cultural heritage
- Archaeological sites
- Heritage lists
- Inventory and Heritage Studies (publisher of the Georg Dehio manual)
- "Sound monuments" (church bells and organs)
- Museums & libraries (excluding national museums)
- Legal Matters (conservation law)
- Art restoration workshops; namely the Central Chemical Laboratory of the Federal Monuments Office at the Vienna Arsenal, and the Architectural conservation restoration workshop in the Mauerbach Charterhouse.

== Art and property restitution ==
The BDA is also responsible for restitution of some 8,000 objects and works of looted art which Austria in the time of National Socialism had acquired by devious means. Since often the original owners and all of their relatives had been killed during the Holocaust, restitution took place in the manner of auctions for the benefit of the Jewish community or to pay for material restitution of destroyed property, as in the case of the Jewish cemetery in Währing. Austria first did little to restore property to the damaged owner, but in the late 1940s and 1950s was put under pressure to make more of an effort according to the Moscow Declaration. As access to archives has slowly opened over time for provenance research, new clues and details such as stickers on the backs of auctioned objects that were photographed, have resulted in the discovery of previously "unfindable" owners. A set of such results was published in early December 2008 and exhibited at the Museum of Applied Arts.

== Periodicals ==
- Austrian magazine for art and historic preservation . Verlag F. Berger, 1947ff, ISSN 0029-9626 (quarterly).
- Restorers annual magazine.
- Studies on conservation and historic preservation. Verlag F. Berger (irregular).
- Austrian Art topography. Verlag F. Berger, 1907ff (irregular releases).
- Department of Natural Monuments, Hofburg (eds): Fund reports from Austria . Verlag F. Berger, 1920ff, ISSN 0429-8926 (annually, as well as material specifications and special volumes).
- Theodor Brückler, Ulrike Nimeth; Federal Monuments Office (ed.): Encyclopedia of the Austrian people Preservation from 1850 to 1990 - 2002. Verlag F. Berger, Vienna 2001, ISBN 978-3-85028-344-1 .

== Literature ==
- Walter Frodl : idea and realization. If the state of conservation in Austria. Vienna, Cologne, Graz 1988, Bundesdenkmalamt Vienna (Ed.): Studies on conservation and historic preservation. XIII
- Manfred Koller : The History of the Restoration in Austria. In: History of the Restoration in Europe / Histoire de la Restoration en Europe. I, Worms 1991, p. 65-85, Bundesdenkmalamt Vienna (Ed.): Acts of International Congress Restauriergeschichte / Histoire de la Restoration. XIII, Interlaken 1989

== See also ==
- Austrian World Heritage Sites
- Denkmalgeschütztes Objekt
