= Fresia =

Fresia may refer to

- Fresia, Chile
- Fresia Island, a lake island in Los Lagos, Chile; see List of islands of South America § Chile
- Chilean submarine Fresia
- Fresia, wife of Mapuche leader Caupolicán
- Mama Fresia, a Mapuche character in the Chilean novel Daughter of Fortune
- Fresia Saavedra, Ecuadorian teacher and singer-songwriter
- Fresia (surname), Italian surname
- Fresia Magdalena, an EP by Sofia Kourtesis

== See also ==
- Freesia, a plant
- Friesia (disambiguation)
- Frisian (disambiguation)
- Freyja (disambiguation)
