= Yeast (journal) =

- Discipline: Mycology
- Language: English
- Edited by: John Armstrong, Dana Davis, Gianni Liti, Steve Oliver

Publication details
- History: 1985-present
- Publisher: Wiley-Blackwell
- Frequency: Monthly
- Impact factor: 3.325 (2021)

Standard abbreviations
- ISO 4: Yeast

Indexing
- CODEN: YESTE3
- ISSN: 0749-503X (print); 1097-0061 (web)
- LCCN: sf94092374
- OCLC no.: 715436033

Links
- Journal homepage; Online access; Online archive

Yeast is a monthly peer-reviewed scientific journal published by Wiley-Blackwell. It publishes original research articles, reviews, and short communications on all aspects of Saccharomyces and other clinically important yeasts. The journal focuses on the most significant developments of research with unicellular fungi, including innovative methods of broad applicability. The editors-in-chief are John Armstrong, Dana Davis, Gianni Liti, Steve Oliver. According to the Journal Citation Reports, the journal has a 2011 impact factor of 1.895.
