= Fungal Genetics and Biology =

Scientific journal

- Discipline: Genetics, Microbiology, Mycology
- Language: English
- Edited by: N. Keller

Publication details
- Former name(s): Experimental Mycology
- History: 1977-present
- Publisher: Academic Press
- Frequency: Monthly
- Impact factor: 3.883 (2021)

Standard abbreviations
- ISO 4: Fungal Genet. Biol.

Indexing
- ISSN: 1087-1845 (print); 1096-0937 (web)

Links
- Journal homepage; Online access

Fungal Genetics and Biology is a peer-reviewed scientific journal established in 1977 as Experimental Mycology, obtaining its current title in 1996. It covers experimental investigations of fungi and their traditional allies that relate structure and function to growth, reproduction, morphogenesis, and differentiation.
