= Mycoscience =

- Discipline: Mycology
- Language: English

Publication details
- History: 1956–present
- Publisher: J-STAGE on behalf of the Mycological Society of Japan
- Frequency: Bimonthly
- Open access: Yes
- Impact factor: 1.4 (2022)

Standard abbreviations
- ISO 4: Mycoscience

Indexing
- ISSN: 1340-3540 (print); 1618-2545 (web)
- OCLC no.: 488153380

Links
- Journal homepage

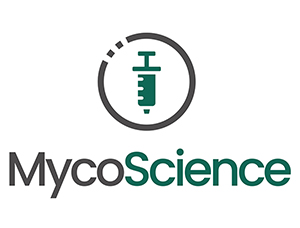

Mycoscience is a peer-reviewed scientific journal covering all aspects of basic and applied research on fungi, including lichens, yeasts, oomycetes, and slime moulds. It is the official journal of the Mycological Society of Japan. A publication of the Mycological Society of Japan, it was founded in 1956 as Transactions of the Mycological Society of Japan (1956–1993) and was later titled Mycoscience (1994–present).

== Editor-in-Chief ==
The following persons have been editor-in-chief of the journal:

- 1956–1969 - Rokuya Imazeki
- 1970–1971 - Minoru Hamada
- 1972–1973 - Hiroharu Indo
- 1974–1975 - Keisuke Tsubaki
- 1976 - Minoru Hamada
- 1976 - Kiyoo Aoshima
- 1977–1978 - Akinori Ueyama
- 1979–1980 - Syunichi Udagawa
- 1981–1984 - Shinichi Hatanaka
- 1985–1988 - Tatsuo Yokoyama
- 1989–1990 - Yukio Harada
- 1991–1992 - Kishio Hatai
- 1995–1996 - Kazuko Nishimura
- 1997–1998 - Takao Horikoshi
- 1999–2000 - Masatoshi Saikawa
- 2001–2004 - Makoto Kakishima
- 2005–2006 - Akira Nakagiri
- 2007–2008 - Gen Okada
- 2009–2010 - Takashi Yaguchi
- 2011–2012 - Yoshitaka Ono
- 2013–2014 - Gen Okada
- 2015–2016 - Takayuki Aoki (Mycologist)
- 2017–2018 - Tsutomu Hattori
- 2019–2020 - Eiji Tanaka
- 2021–2022 - Yutaka Tamai
- 2023–present - Kiminori Shimizu

According to the Journal Citation Reports, Mycoscience has an impact factor of 1.4.

== Abstracting and indexing ==
Mycoscience is abstracted and indexed in:

- Science Citation Index Expanded
- Scopus
- CAB International
- Academic OneFile
- Academic Search
- AGRICOLA
- Biological Abstracts
- BIOSIS
- CAB Abstracts
- Chemical Abstracts Service
- J-STAGE
- EMBiology
- VINITI Database RAS
- The Zoological Record
