= Journal of Fungi =

- Discipline: Mycology
- Language: English
- Edited by: David S. Perlin

Publication details
- History: 2015–present
- Publisher: MDPI
- Frequency: Quarterly
- Open access: Yes
- Impact factor: 5.724 (2021)

Standard abbreviations
- ISO 4: J. Fungi (Basel)

Indexing
- CODEN: JFOUCU
- ISSN: 2309-608X
- OCLC no.: 941792439

Links
- Journal homepage

Journal of Fungi is a peer-reviewed open access scientific journal published by MDPI quarterly covering all aspects of Fungi. It was established in 2015. The editor in chief is David S. Perlin (Hackensack Meridian Health Center for Discovery and Innovation). The journal is associated with the European Confederation of Medical Mycology.

== Abstracting and indexing ==
The journal is abstracted and indexed in:

- Biological Abstracts
- BIOSIS Previews
- Chemical Abstracts Service
- Current Contents/Life Sciences
- Scopus
- Science Citation Index Expanded
