= Deutschsprachige Mykologische Gesellschaft =

Deutschsprachige Mykologische Gesellschaft (DMykG) e.V. (German-Speaking Mycological Society) has been acknowledged as a non-profit organisation. The society was founded in 1961 as a platform for all scientists of the German-speaking area who are interested in mycology either from a medical or veterinary standpoint, i.e. medical mycology or veterinary mycology. To promote science and research is a prime concern. The society is based in the city of Essen.

The society currently has about 500 members and organises yearly meetings. These meetings are held for several days each year and are dubbed Myk. Working parties for “clinical mycology” as well as “mycological laboratory diagnostics” make major contributions to the work of the society. The scientific organ of the society publishes the internationally renowned journal Mycoses. Moreover, the society publishes a scientific magazine dubbed Mykologie Forum which is distributed 4 times a year in a circulation of about 5.000 issues to members as well as further interested groups of physicians.

Mycological quality management forms a major part of the work of the society. In this context there is a focus on the preparation and updating of guidelines. Currently, the society provides under the canopy of Arbeitsgemeinschaft der Medizinisch-Wissenschaftlichen Fachgesellschaften (AWMF) 6 guidelines (for the electronic version see www.awmf-leitlinien.de), namely „tinea of glabrous skin“, „onychomycosis“, „vulvovaginal candidosis“, „cutaneous candidosis“, “oral candidosis”, and “tinea capitis”. Just recently, English versions of the German language guidelines have started to be published in mycoses.

On international grounds Deutschsprachige Mykologische Gesellschaft cooperates with the International Society for Human and Animal Mycology (ISHAM) as well as the European Confederation of Medical Mycology (ECMM).

Promotion of the career of younger mycologists is a major concern. In this context a prize for the promotion of mycological research dubbed Forschungsförderungspreis is offered yearly.

To provide a sound basis for the work of the society recently a corresponding foundation has been established, dubbed Stiftung der Deutschsprachigen Mykologische Gesellschaft e.V..
