= Forest Pathology (journal) =

- Discipline: Forest pathology
- Language: English
- Edited by: Steve Woodward

Publication details
- History: 1971-present
- Publisher: Wiley-Blackwell
- Frequency: Bimonthly
- Impact factor: 1.670 (2012)

Standard abbreviations
- ISO 4: For. Pathol.

Indexing
- CODEN: FOPAFV
- ISSN: 1437-4781 (print); 1439-0329 (web)
- LCCN: 00220241
- OCLC no.: 782075371

Links
- Journal homepage; Online access; Online archive

Forest Pathology/Journal de Pathologie Forestière/Zeitschrift für Forstpathologie is a bimonthly peer-reviewed scientific journal dedicated to forest pathology. It covers the subject of tree diseases caused by phytoplasmas, viruses, bacteria, fungi, and nematodes as well as those caused by genetic, physical, chemical, and environmental factors such as air pollution.

According to the Journal Citation Reports, the journal has a 2017 impact factor of 1.741.
