= Mycoses (journal) =

- Discipline: Mycology
- Language: English
- Edited by: Oliver Cornely, Jacques Meis and Martin Schaller

Publication details
- Former name(s): Mykosen
- History: 1957–present
- Publisher: Wiley-Blackwell
- Frequency: Monthly
- Impact factor: 4.931 (2021)

Standard abbreviations
- ISO 4: Mycoses

Indexing
- ISSN: 0933-7407 (print); 1439-0507 (web)

Links
- Journal homepage

Mycoses: Diagnosis, Therapy and Prophylaxis of Fungal Diseases is a monthly peer-reviewed medical journal covering mycology. It is published by Wiley-Blackwell. The editor-in-chief are Oliver Cornely, Jacques Meis and Martin Schaller. It is the official publication of the Deutschsprachige Mykologische Gesellschaft. The journal covers the pathogenesis, diagnosis, therapy, prophylaxis, and epidemiology of fungal infectious diseases in humans and animals as well as on the biology of pathogenic fungi.

== History ==
The journal was established in 1957 by Heinz Grimmer (Wiesbaden) and published by Medizinische Verlags Anstalt (Berlin) under the title Mykosen (German for "mycoses"). It was originally published in German, but switched 1988 to English. At that time the title was changed to Mycoses.

== Abstracting and indexing ==
According to the Journal Citation Reports, the journal has a 2018 impact factor of 3.065.
