= Medical Mycology =

- Discipline: Medical mycology
- Language: English
- Edited by: Karl V. Clemons

Publication details
- Former names: Sabouraudia, Journal of Medical and Veterinary Mycology
- History: 1962-present
- Publisher: Oxford University Press on behalf of the International Society of Human and Animal Mycology
- Frequency: 8/year
- Impact factor: 3.747 (2021)

Standard abbreviations
- ISO 4: Med. Mycol.

Indexing
- CODEN: MEMYFR
- ISSN: 1369-3786 (print); 1460-2709 (web)
- LCCN: 99113023
- OCLC no.: 38873464

Links
- Journal homepage; Online access; Online archive

Medical Mycology is a peer-reviewed medical journal published by Oxford University Press on behalf of the International Society for Human and Animal Mycology. It was established in 1962 as Sabouraudia, honoring the French dermatologist/medical mycologist, Raimond Sabouraud and publishing 3 to 4 issues per year. In 1986 the name was changed to Journal of Medical and Veterinary Mycology and the number of issues was increased to six per year. The journal obtained its current name in 1998, increasing the number of yearly issues to eight in 2005. In addition, the journal occasionally publishes supplemental issues on specific topics of current interest to the medical mycology community or the proceedings of international conferences.

The journal covers all aspects of medical, veterinary, and environmental mycology. The editor-in-chief is Karl V. Clemons (California Institute for Medical Research).

According to the Journal Citation Reports, the journal has a 2018 impact factor of 2.851.
