= Sydowia (journal) =

- Discipline: Mycology
- Language: English
- Edited by: Irmgard Krisai-Greilhuber

Publication details
- Former name(s): Annales Mycologici
- History: 1903–present
- Publisher: Verlag Berger
- Frequency: Biannual
- Open access: Hybrid
- Impact factor: 1.410 (2021)

Standard abbreviations
- ISO 4: Sydowia

Indexing
- CODEN: SYAMAU
- ISSN: 0082-0598
- LCCN: 58034637
- OCLC no.: 1767032

Links
- Journal homepage; Early volumes

Sydowia is a biannual peer-reviewed scientific journal covering the study of fungi, including their taxonomy, systematics, evolution, structure, development, ecology, pathology in plants, animals, and humans, and biotechnological applications. It is published by Verlag Ferdinand Berger & Söhne. Its editor in chief is Irmgard Krisai-Greilhuber.

== History ==
The journal was originally established in 1903 under the title Annales Mycologici by founding editor Hans Sydow. It was continued as Annales mycologici, series II and retitled with the prefix Sydowia in Sydow's honour following his death in 1946. Sydowia was edited by Franz Petrak from 1947 until his death in 1973. Egon Horak succeeded him until 1989. Orlando Petrini took over from 1989 to 1996 and Liliane Petrini until 2004.

Sydowia was published bimonthly from 1947 and biannually since 1992. Now published in English, earlier volumes included papers in English, French, German, Italian, Latin, and Spanish.

Volumes since 2012 are available online. Volumes 1 to 30 are freely available online.

== Abstracting and indexing ==
The journal is abstracted and indexed in:

- Scopus
- Science Citation Index Expanded
- CAB Abstracts
- Current Contents/Agriculture, Biology & Environmental Sciences

According to the Journal Citation Reports, the journal has a 2013 impact factor of 0.213.
