= Mycology =

Study of fungi

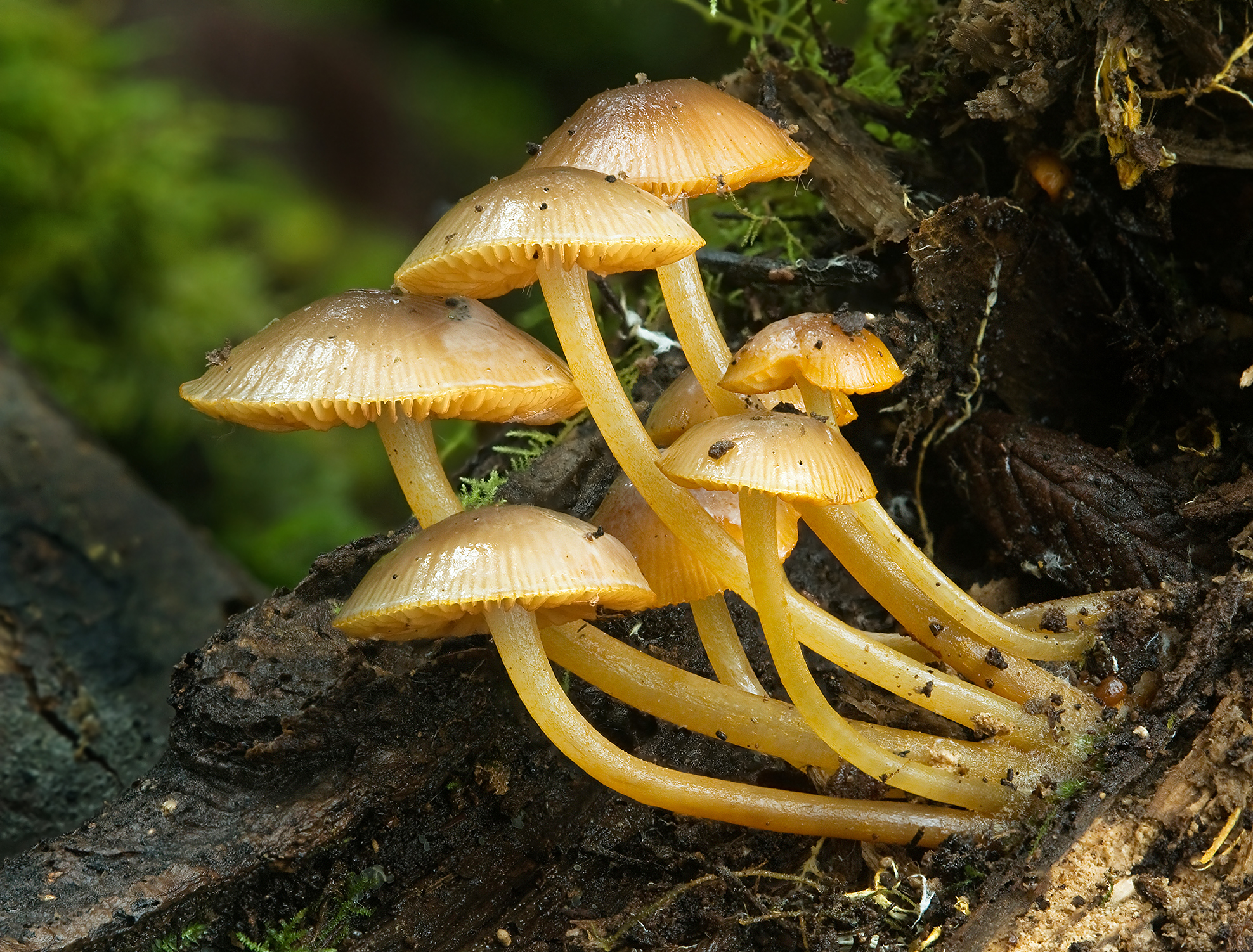
Mature Mycena leaiana, a kind of mushroom, in Mount Field National Park

Mycology is the branch of biology concerned with the study of fungi, including their taxonomy, genetics, biochemical properties, and use by humans. Fungi can be a source of tinder, food, and traditional medicine, as well as entheogens, poison, and infection. Yeasts are among the most heavily utilized members of the fungus kingdom, particularly in food manufacturing.

Mycology overlaps with the field of phytopathology, the study of plant diseases. The two disciplines are closely related, because the majority of plant pathogens are fungi. A biologist specializing in mycology is called a mycologist.

== Overview ==
The word mycology comes from the Ancient Greek: μύκης (mukēs), meaning "fungus" and the suffix -λογία (-logia), meaning "study." Pioneer mycologists included Elias Magnus Fries, Christiaan Hendrik Persoon, Heinrich Anton de Bary, Elizabeth Eaton Morse, and Lewis David de Schweinitz. Beatrix Potter, author of The Tale of Peter Rabbit, also made significant contributions to the field. Pier Andrea Saccardo developed a system for classifying the imperfect fungi by spore color and form, which became the primary system used before classification by DNA analysis. He is most famous for his Sylloge Fungorum, which was a comprehensive list of all of the names that had been used for mushrooms. Sylloge is still the only work of this kind that was both comprehensive for the botanical kingdom Fungi and reasonably modern.

Many fungi produce toxins, antibiotics, and other secondary metabolites. For example, the cosmopolitan genus Fusarium and their toxins associated with fatal outbreaks of alimentary toxic aleukia in humans were extensively studied by Abraham Z. Joffe.

Fungi are fundamental for life on earth in their roles as symbionts, e.g. in the form of mycorrhizae, insect symbionts, and lichens. Many fungi are able to break down complex organic biomolecules such as lignin, the more durable component of wood, and pollutants such as xenobiotics, petroleum, and polycyclic aromatic hydrocarbons. By decomposing these molecules, fungi play a critical role in the global carbon cycle.

Fungi and other organisms traditionally recognized as fungi, such as oomycetes and myxomycetes (slime molds), often are economically and socially important, as some cause diseases of animals (including humans) and of plants.

Apart from pathogenic fungi, many fungal species are very important in controlling the plant diseases caused by different pathogens. For example, species of the filamentous fungal genus Trichoderma are considered one of the most important biological control agents as an alternative to chemical-based products for effective crop disease management.

Field meetings to find interesting species of fungi are known as 'forays', after the first such meeting organized by the Woolhope Naturalists' Field Club in 1868 and entitled "A foray among the funguses [sic]".

Some fungi can cause disease in humans and other animals; the study of pathogenic fungi that infect animals is referred to as medical mycology.

== History ==
It is believed that humans started collecting mushrooms as food in prehistoric times. Mushrooms were first written about in the works of Euripides (480–406 BC). The Greek philosopher Theophrastos of Eresos (371–288 BC) was perhaps the first to try to systematically classify plants; mushrooms were considered to be plants missing certain organs. It was later Pliny the Elder (23–79 AD), who wrote about truffles in his encyclopedia Natural History.

Fungi and truffles are neither herbs, nor roots, nor flowers, nor seeds, but merely the superfluous moisture or earth, of trees, or rotten wood, and of other rotting things. This is plain from the fact that all fungi and truffles, especially those that are used for eating, grow most commonly in thundery and wet weather.

— Jerome Bock (Hieronymus Tragus), 1552

The Middle Ages saw little advancement in the body of knowledge about fungi. However, the invention of the printing press allowed authors to dispel superstitions and misconceptions about the fungi that had been perpetuated by the classical authors.

In 1245, a Chinese scholar named Chen Renyu wrote a book called the Junpu, which described many different mushrooms. It is one of the oldest known mushroom books.

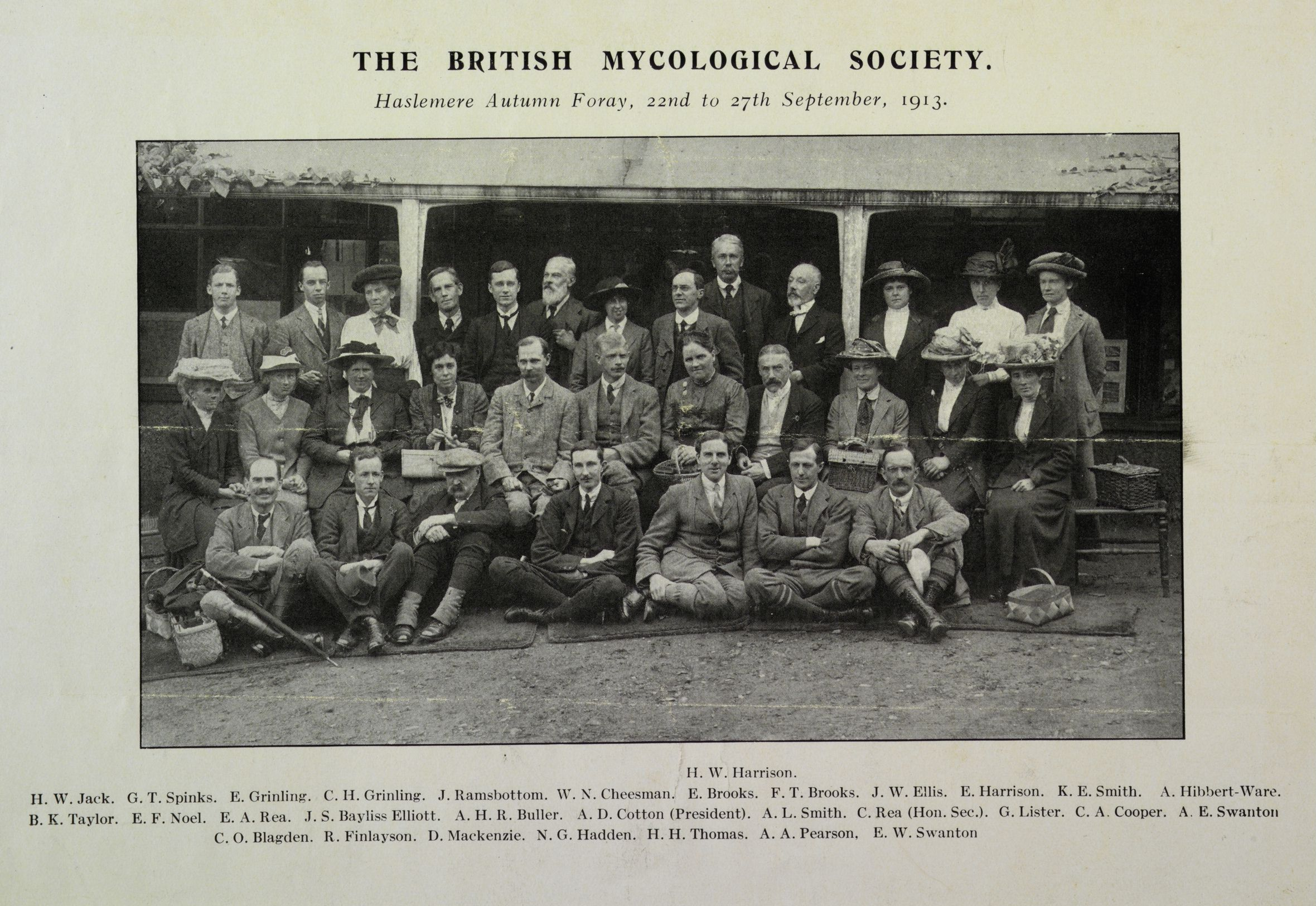
Group photograph taken at a meeting of the British Mycological Society in 1913

The start of the modern age of mycology begins with Pier Antonio Micheli's 1737 publication of Nova plantarum genera. Published in Florence, this seminal work laid the foundations for the systematic classification of grasses, mosses and fungi. He originated the still current genus names Polyporus and Tuber, both dated 1729 (though the descriptions were later amended as invalid by modern rules).

The founding nomenclaturist Carl Linnaeus included fungi in his binomial naming system in 1753, where each type of organism has a two-word name consisting of a genus and species (whereas up to then organisms were often designated with Latin phrases containing many words). He originated the scientific names of numerous well-known mushroom taxa, such as Boletus and Agaricus, which are still in use today. During this period, fungi were still considered to belong to the plant kingdom, so they were categorized in his Species Plantarum. Linnaeus' fungal taxa were not nearly as comprehensive as his plant taxa, however, grouping together all gilled mushrooms with a stem in genus Agaricus. Thousands of gilled species exist, which were later divided into dozens of diverse genera; in its modern usage, Agaricus only refers to mushrooms closely related to the common shop mushroom, Agaricus bisporus. For example, Linnaeus gave the name Agaricus deliciosus to the saffron milk-cap, but its current name is Lactarius deliciosus. On the other hand, the field mushroom Agaricus campestris has kept the same name ever since Linnaeus's publication. The English word "agaric" is still used for any gilled mushroom, which corresponds to Linnaeus's use of the word.

Although mycology was historically considered a branch of botany, the 1969 discovery of fungi's close evolutionary relationship to animals resulted in the study's reclassification as an independent field. The term mycology and the complementary term mycologist are traditionally attributed to M.J. Berkeley in 1836. However, mycologist appeared in writings by English botanist Robert Kaye Greville as early as 1823 in reference to Schweinitz.

== Scope and importance ==
=== Production, trade, and food manufacturing ===
Lumber and timber products are a key element of international trade, as they are used for all things from architecture to firewood. The cultivation of forested ecosystems to produce this amount of usable wood is highly dependent on the mycorrhizal symbiotic relationships between plants, specifically trees, and fungi. The fungi provide a great number of benefits to their symbiotic plant partner, such as disease tolerance, improved growth and mineral nutrition, stress tolerance, and even fertilizer utilization.

Another major component of international trade over recent years has been edible and medicinal mushrooms. While many fungal species can be cultivated in large farming installations, the cultivation of some coveted species has yet to be fully understood, which means that there are many species that can only be found naturally in the wild. While the demand of wild mushroom species has increased worldwide over recent years, the rarity of these species has not changed. Even still, mushroom hunting has become a key factor in local economies.

Increased scientific knowledge of fungal diversity has led to biotechnological advances in food manufacturing. Humans have utilized this knowledge by cultivating various types of fungi, particularly yeasts. There are over 500 species of yeasts that have been cultivated for different purposes, the most common of which is Saccharomyces cerevisiae, also known as baker's yeast. As its common name suggests, S. cerevisiae has been used for winemaking, baking, and brewing since ancient times.

Fermentation is one of the earliest forms of food preservation, with the earliest recorded use dating back over 13,000 years ago in Israel. The cultivation of bacteria and fungi, particularly yeasts, have been used for centuries to increase the storage life of meats, vegetables, grains, and other foods. Fermentation also plays a significant role in the production of various food products and alcoholic beverages such as beer and wine. About 90% of the world's beer production comes from lager beer and 5% from ale beer, while the rest is from spontaneous fermentation of a variety of yeasts and bacteria. Production of alcoholic beverages play significant roles in the economics of many countries, with beer often being a crucial export.

=== Plant pathogenic fungi ===
Plant pathogenic fungi are a serious threat when it comes to crop availability and food security. These fungi can infiltrate plants and food crops, which can cause serious economic issues for agricultural industries in numerous countries. Various plant pathogens can cause cash crops to become inedible and virtually useless to the farmer that is growing them. This problem has increased over the years as the usage of monocultures have become more prevalent: a limited variety of plants in one area can lead to the rapid spread of specific pathogens. Puccinia graminis is a type of stem rust that targets wheat crops worldwide from Africa to Europe. Another devastating fungal pathogen is Sarocladium oryzae, which is a type of sheath rot fungus prevalent in India and is a great threat to rice cultivation. Historically, one of the more well-known cases of plant-fungal pandemics was the potato blight of Ireland, which was caused by a water mold known as Phytophthora infestans. This event is known as the Great Famine of Ireland.

== Mycology and drug discovery ==
For centuries, certain mushrooms have been documented as a folk medicine in China, Japan, and Russia. Although the use of mushrooms in folk medicine is centered largely on the Asian continent, people in other parts of the world like the Middle East, Poland, and Belarus have been documented using mushrooms for medicinal purposes.

Mushrooms produce large amounts of vitamin D when exposed to ultraviolet (UV) light. Penicillin, ciclosporin, griseofulvin, cephalosporin and psilocybin are examples of drugs that have been isolated from molds or other fungi.

== Philosophy and computing ==
Fungi have become a subject of philosophical inquiry into the nature of cognition, intelligence, and mind. The popular science book Entangled Life by biologist Merlin Sheldrake brought wide attention to questions of fungal individuality and whether fungi display something resembling intelligence, arguing that fungi unsettle established categories used to describe living systems. Kristina Šekrst, in Topics in Cognitive Science, argues that fungal mycelial networks exhibit minimal cognition through memory-integrated adaptive regulation, drawing on cybernetic and enactivist accounts to describe fungal memory without appeal to neural substrates or symbolic representation.

Andrew Adamatzky has recorded oscillations of electrical potential in mycelium and sporocarps and interpreted the resulting spike trains as a possible form of information processing. He grouped these spikes into clusters he described as "words" and reported that their length distribution resembles that of human languages, while cautioning that the resemblance might be superficial and stop short of demonstrating genuine communication. Extending this work, Adamatzky and co-authors report neuron-like patterns of electrical spiking activity in fungi and argue that these support attributing forms of cognition and consciousness to fungi.

Adamatzky has also argued that fungi themselves can serve as a computing substrate, proposing that basidiomycetes could represent information as spikes of electrical activity, carry out computation within the mycelial network, and relay results through fruit bodies, reporting that stimulating one fruit body alters the electrical activity of others in the same cluster and so indicating transfer of information across the colony. Nic Roberts and Adamatzky showed that the nonlinear electrical response of living mycelium can be configured to realise Boolean logic gates, treating the fungal colony as a form of unconventional hardware. This line of work is collected in the edited volume Fungal Machines: Sensing and Computing with Fungi (2023), which surveys fungal electrical activity, biosensors, wearables, electronic components, and computing prototypes, and closes with chapters on fungal cognition and mind. Research of this kind treats computation and sensing as capacities that can be instantiated in a living, non-neural organism, which situates fungal biology within broader debates in unconventional computing and the philosophy of mind.

== See also ==
- Ethnomycology
- Fungal biochemical test
- Glossary of mycology
- List of mycologists
- List of mycology journals
- Marine fungi
- Mushroom hunting
- Mycotoxicology
- Pathogenic fungi
- Protistology
