= List of women botanists =

This is a list of women botanists.

Name	Description	Birth date	Death date	Country	Image
A.S. Losina-Losinskaja	Soviet botanist (1903–1958)	1903	1958	Russian Empire; Soviet Union	
Adeline Ames	American mycologist	1879	1976	United States	
Adriana Hoffmann	Chilean botanist	1940-01-29	2022-03-20	Chile	
Adrienne Clarke	Australian botanist	1938-01-06			
Agnes Arber	British botanist	1879-02-23	1960-03-22	United Kingdom	
Agnes Block	Dutch botanist and art collector	1629-10-29	1704-04-20	Netherlands	
Agnes Ibbetson	British physiologist	1757	1823-02	United Kingdom of Great Britain and Ireland	
Agnes Quirk	American botanist	1884	1974	United States	
Aime Mäemets	Estonian scientist	1930-09-29	1996-07-17		
Aimée Antoinette Camus	French botanist	1879-05-01	1965-04-17	France	
Aino Henssen	German lichenologist	1925-04-12	2011-08-29	Germany	
Alice Eastwood	Canadian American botanist	1859-01-19	1953-10-30	Canada; United States	
Alice Faber Tryon	American botanist	1920	2009	United States	
Alice Haskins	American botanist	1880-04-24	1971-10-16	United States	
Alice Lounsberry	Botanist	1872	1949	United States	
Alice Pegler	South African botanist	1861-07-21	1929-06-17	South Africa	
Alicia Amherst	English horticulturist and author of the first scholarly account of English gardening history.	1865	1941		
Alicia Lourteig	Argentine botanist	1913-12-17	2003-07-30	Argentina	
Almira Hart Lincoln Phelps	American educator and botanist	1793-07-15	1884-07-15	United States	
Almut Gitter Jones	German-American botanist and plant taxonomist	1923-09-08	2013-10-12	United States	
Amalie Dietrich	German naturalist	1821-05-26	1891-03-09	Germany	
Amelia Griffiths	British amateur phycologist	1768	1858	United Kingdom	
Amparo de Zeledón	Costa Rican botanist and philanthropist	1870-08-07	1951-04-20	Costa Rica	
Amy Jacot Guillarmod	South African botanist	1911-05-23	1992	South Africa	
Angela Piskernik	botanist and conservationist	1886-08-27	1967-12-23	Slovenia	
Angélica M. Arambarri	botanist and mycologist	1945-04-22	2012-12-11	Argentina	
Angie Beckwith	American phytopathologist	1881-01-27	1964-10-02	United States	
Ann Bishop	British biologist	1899-12-19	1990-05-07		
Ann Marvet	Estonian botanist	1939-04-21		Estonia	
Anna Amelia Obermeyer	South African botanist	1907-07-30	2001-10-10	British Empire; South Africa	
Anna Atkins	English botanist and photographer	1799-03-16	1871-06-09	United Kingdom	
Anna Maria Walker	British botanist in Ceylon	1778	1852-09-08	United Kingdom	
Anna Maurizio	Swiss botanist	1900-11-26	1993-07-24	Switzerland	
Anna Murray Vail	American botanist	1863-01-07	1955-12-18	United States	
Anna Russell	British botanist	1807	1876		
Anna Schchian	Russian botanist	1905-07-09	1990-05-15	Soviet Union	
Anna Vickers	British phycologist	1852-06-28	1906-08-01	United Kingdom	
Anna Weber-Van Bosse	Dutch marine biologist	1852-03-27	1942-10-29	Kingdom of the Netherlands	
Lady Anne Brewis	British botanist	1911-03-26	2002	United Kingdom	
Anne Catherine Hof Blinks	American botanist	1903	1995	United States	
Anne Elizabeth Ball	Irish botanist, algologist, and botanical illustrator	1808	1872	Ireland	
Annie Gravatt	American phytopathologist	1894	1986	United States	
Annie Lorrain Smith	British lichenologist	1854-10-23	1937-09-07	United Kingdom	
Annie Morrill Smith	American botanist	1856-02-13	1946	United States	
Anthea Phillipps	Malaysian botanist	1956-06-03		Malaysia	
Antonina Borissova	Russian botanist	1903	1970	Soviet Union	
Antonina Pojarkova	Russian expert on caucasian flora	1897	1980	Soviet Union	
Arabella Elizabeth Roupell	British artist	1817-03-23	1914-07-31	South Africa	
Astrid Cleve	Botanist, geologist, chemist	1875-01-22	1968-04-08	Sweden	
Audrey Brooks	British botanist and plant pathologist	1933	2018	United Kingdom	
Augusta Vera Duthie	South African botanist and mycologist (1881-1963)	1881-07-18	1963-08-08	South Africa	
Avishag Zahavi	Israeli biologist	1922	2021-10-31	Israel	
Barbara G. Briggs	Botanist	1934-06-15; 1934-11-22; 1934		Australia	
Barbara Pickersgill	British botanist	1940			
Beatrice Willard	botanist	1927-12-19; 1925	2003	United States	
Bernadette Cozart	American gardener and botanist	1949-05-17	2009-07-27		
Bernice Giduz Schubert	American botanist	1913-10-06	2000-08-14	United States	
Bertha Stoneman		1866-08-18	1943-04-30	United States	
Berthe Hoola van Nooten	Dutch botanist	1817-10-12	1892-04-12	Kingdom of the Netherlands	
Blanca Renée Arrillaga	Uruguayan scientist	1917	2011	Argentina	
Bonnie C. Templeton	American botanist	1906-10-23	2002	United States	
Carlotta Case Hall	American botanist	1880	1949	United States	
Carmen Lelia Cristóbal	Botanist	1932		Argentina	
Carmen Pujals	Argentinian botanist	1916	2003	Argentina	
Carrie Derick	Canadian botanist and geneticist	1862-01-14	1941-11-10	Canada	
Catharine Furbish	American botanist	1834-05-09	1931-12-06	United States	
Catharine Parr Traill	English-Canadian author	1802-01-09	1899-08-29	Canada	
Catherine Gage	Irish botanist	1815-05-18	1892-02-16		
Cecile Hulse Matschat	American botanist and geographer	1895	1976		
Charlotte Cortlandt Ellis	American plant collector	1874-06-27	1956-03-17	United States	
Charlotte Elliott	American plant physiologist	1883	1974		
Charlotte Grace O'Brien	Irish writer	1845	1909		
Charlotte Nichols Saunders Horner	American botanist	1823-07-05	1906-07-18	United States	
Chen Hang	Botanist	1931			
Chicita F. Culberson	American lichenologist	1931-11-01	2023-03-05	United States	
Christine Marie von Cappelen	Norwegian botanist	1766-09-21	1849-04-08	Norway	
Christine Buisman	Dutch botanist	1900-03-22	1936-03-27	Kingdom of the Netherlands	
Christine Marie Berkhout	Dutch biologist	1893	1932	Kingdom of the Netherlands	
Christine H. Sophie Kabuye	Ugandan ethnobotanist	1938		Uganda and Kenya	
Clara Eaton Cummings	American cryptogamic botanist	1855-07-13	1906-12-28	United States	
Clara Ethelinda Larter	English botanist	1847-06-27	1936-05-13	United Kingdom	
Clara H. Hasse	American botanist	1880	1926-10-10	United States	
Clarissa Tracy	American botanist	1818-11-12	1905-11-13	United States	
Clelia Durazzo Grimaldi	Botanist, aristocrat	1760	1830		
Cleofé Caldéron	Botanist	1929-10-26	2007-03-19	Argentina	
Constance Endicott Hartt	American biologist	1900-11-02	1984-12-21	United States	
Cythna Letty	South African botanical artist	1895-01-01	1985-05-03	South Africa	
Daphne Osborne	Botanist	1930-03-07	2006-06-16	United Kingdom	
Deborah M. Pearsall	American paleoethnobotany	1950		United States	
Dianne Edwards	Palaeobotanist	1942		United Kingdom	
Doris Löve	Swedish-Icelandic botanist (1918–2000)	1918-01-02	2000-02-25	Sweden	
Dorothea Pertz	Pertz, Dorothea Frances Matilda [Dora] (1859–1939), botanist	1859-03-14	1939-03-06		
Dorothy Adlington Cadbury	British botanist and company director	1892-10-14	1987-08-21	United Kingdom	
Dorothy Popenoe	English botanist and archaeologist	1899-06; 1899	1932	United Kingdom	
Éanna ni Lamhna	Entomologist, botanist, ecologist, radio and television presenter, author	1950			
Edith Coleman	Australian naturalist	1874	1951	Australia	
Edith Gertrude Schwartz	botanist (1877-1971)	1877-10-05	1971-07-26	United States	
Edith Katherine Cash	American mycologist	1890-10-04	1992-04-06		
Edith Layard Stephens	South African botanist	1884	1966	South Africa	
Edna H. Fawcett	American botanist	1879	1960	United States	
Edna P. Plumstead	Paleobotanist	1903-09-15	1989-09-23		
Effie Almira Southworth	American botanist	1860	1947		
Eileen Adelaide Bruce	British botanist (1905–1955)	1905	1955	United Kingdom	
Elaine Bullard	British botanist	1915	2011		
Eleanor Marion Bennett	botanist	1942		Australia	
Eleanor Mary Reid	British palaeobotanist	1860-11-13	1953-09-28	United Kingdom	
Eleanor Vachell	Welsh botanist	1879-01-08; 1879	1948-12-06; 1948	United Kingdom	
Elena Paunero Ruiz	Spanish botanist	1906-09-21	2009-03-09	Spain	
Elisa Caroline Bommer	Belgian botanist	1832-01-19	1910-01-17		
Elisa de Vilmorin	French horticulturalist	1826-05-03	1868-08-05	France	
Elisabeth Christina von Linné	Swedish botanist	1743-06-14	1782-04-15	Sweden	
Elisabeth Gantt	American botanist	1934		United States	
Elisabeth Schiemann	botanist, geneticist	1881-08-15	1972-01-03	Germany	
Elisabeth Tschermak-Woess	Austrian cytologist, phycologist and lichenologist	1917-01-28	2001-04-26	Austria	
Elise Hofmann	Austrian paleobotanist	1889-02-05	1955-03-14	Austria	
Eliza Amy Hodgson	Botanist	1888-10-10	1983-01-07	New Zealand	
Eliza Ann Youmans	American botanist	1826-12-17	1914-09-27	United States	
Eliza Standerwick Gregory	Botanist	1840-12-06	1932-03-22	United Kingdom	
Elizabeth A. Widjaja	botanist	1951			
Elizabeth Blackwell	Scottish botanical illustrator and author	1707	1758	United Kingdom	
Elizabeth Coleman White	Blueberry botanist	1871-10-05	1954-11-11	United States	
Elizabeth Gertrude Britton	American botanist	1857-01-09	1934-02-25	United States	
Elizabeth Jill Cowley	British botanist	1940		United Kingdom	
Elizabeth Lomax	English botanist	1810-02-22	1895-03-16	United Kingdom	
Elizabeth McClintock	Botanist	1912	2004	United States	
Elizabeth Stack (nee Jones)	Collector of ferns and mosses	1829	1919	New Zealand	
Elizabeth Twining	English botanical illustrator	1805	1889	United Kingdom	
Elke Mackenzie	British-American lichenologist	1911-09-11	1990-01-18	United Kingdom of Great Britain and Ireland	
Ellen Hutchins	Irish botanist	1785	1815	Ireland	
Ellen Schulz Quillin	American botanist, author and museum director	1892-06-16	1970-05-06	United States	
Ellen Willmott	English horticulturist	1858-08-19	1934-09-27	United Kingdom	
Ellen Wright Blackwell	Writer, botanist	1864-10-07	1952-02-24	New Zealand	
Elsa Beata Bunge	Botanist	1734-04-18	1819-01-19	Sweden	
Elsa Nyholm	Swedish botanist	1911	2002	Sweden	
Elsie Conway	British botanist and phycologist	1902; 1902-03-15	1992; 1992-07-22	United Kingdom	
Elsie Elizabeth Esterhuysen	South African botanist	1912	2006	South Africa	
Elsie M. Burrows	British Botanist	1913	1986	United Kingdom	
Elsie Mary Griffin	Botany teacher, community organisation administrator	1884-11-01	1968-05-03	New Zealand	
Elsie Maud Wakefield	British mycologist	1886-07-03	1972-06-17	United Kingdom	
Elva Lawton	American botanist	1896-04-03	1993-02-03	United States	
Elzada Clover	American botanist	1896	1980	United States	
Emilie Snethlage	Brazilian naturalist and ornithologist	1868-04-13	1929-11-25	Brazil; Germany	
Emily Collins	British botanist	1858	1945	United Kingdom	
Emily Dix	Paleobotanist	1904-05-21	1972	United Kingdom	
Emma Cole	American botanist	1845-01-23	1910-04-25	United States	
Emma Laughlin		1866	1962		
Emma Lucy Braun	American botanist	1889-04-19	1971-03-05	United States	
Enid Lucy Robertson	Australian botanist and conservationist	1925-11-20	2016-07-10	Australia	
Estella Leopold	American botanist	1927-01-08	2024-02-25	United States	
Esther Orozco	Mexican biologist, researcher and politician	1945-04-25		Mexico	
Ethel Anson Peckham	botanist (1879-1965)	1879	1965		
Ethel Bailey Higgins	American botanist	1866	1963	United States	
Ethel de Fraine	British botanist	1879	1918	United Kingdom	
Ethel Sargant	Botanist	1863-10-28	1918-01-16	United Kingdom	
Ethel Thomas	English botanist	1876	1944		
Ethel Zoe Bailey	American botanist (1889-1983)	1889-11-17	1983	United States	
Eva Mameli Calvino	Botanist	1886-02-12	1978-03-31	Italy	
Eva Schönbeck-Temesy	botanist (1930-2011)	1930	2011		
Eve Palmer	South African non-fiction writer and botanist	1916-02-20	1998	South Africa	
Evelyn Booth	Irish botanist	1897-10-30	1988	Ireland	
Flora Wambaugh Patterson	American mycologist	1847	1928	United States	
Florence Hedges	American botanist	1878-08-24	1956-12-17	United States	
Florence Meier Chase	American botanist	1902	1978-05-06	United States	
Florence Woolward	British botanical illustrator and botanist	1854	1936-01-03	United Kingdom	
Frances Acton	British botanist, archaeologist and artist (1794-1881)	1794-07-07	1881-01-24	United Kingdom	
Frances Margaret Leighton	South African botanist	1909-03-08	2006-01-08	Union of South Africa; South Africa; Australia	
Frances Meehan Latterell	Botanist	1920-12-21	2008-11-05	United States	
Frances Theodora Parsons	Botanist	1861-12-05	1952-06-10	United States	
Françoise Ardré	French botanist	1931	2010	France	
Gabriele Rabel	Austrian botanist	1880	1963	Austria	
Gabrielle Howard	British botanist	1876-10-03	1930-08-18	United Kingdom	
Georgia Mason	Botanist	1910-03-16	2007-10-08	United States	
Gertrud Dahlgren	botanist (1931-2009)	1931	2009		
Gertrude Bacon	Writer, Aeronaut, Botanist	1874-04-19	1949-12-22		
Gertrude Jekyll	garden designer, artist	1843-11-29	1932-12-08	United Kingdom	
Gertrude Simmons Burlingham	early 20th-century American mycologist	1872-04-21	1952-01-11	United States	
Gloria Galeano Garcés	Colombian scientist	1958-04-22	2016-03-23	Colombia	
Grace Evelyn Pickford	Biologist	1902	1986	United States	
Greta Stevenson	New Zealand mycologist	1911-06-10	1990-12-18	New Zealand	
Grethe Rytter Hasle	Norwegian scientist	1920-01-03	2013-11-09	Norway	
Gulielma Lister	Lister, Gulielma (1860–1949), mycologist and naturalist	1860-10-28	1949-05-18		
Guranda Gvaladze	Georgian botanist	1932-06-23	2020-01-24		
Gwendoline Joyce Lewis	British-born South African botanist (1909–1967)	1909	1967	United Kingdom; South Africa	
Haide-Ene Rebassoo	Estonian botanist	1935-01-25	2018-12-27		
Hanna Margońska	Botanist, Taxonomist	1968		Poland	
Hanna Resvoll-Holmsen	Norwegian biologist	1873-09-11	1943-03-13	Norway	
Hannah Caroline Aase	botanist (1883-1980)	1883-07-12	1980-11-23		
Harriet Creighton	American geneticist	1909-06-27	2004-01-09	United States	
Harriet Margaret Louisa Bolus	South African botanist (1877-1970)	1877-07-31	1970-04-05	British Empire; Union of South Africa; South Africa	
Hazel Marguerite Schmoll	American botanist (1890–1990)	1890-08-23	1990-01-31	United States	
Hedvig Lovén	Swedish botanist	1867	1943	Sweden	
Heidrun Elsbeth Klara Osterwald Hartmann	German botanist	1942-08-05; 1942	2016-07-11	Germany	
Helen Margaret Gilkey	American mycologist	1886	1972	United States	
Helen Morgenthau Fox	Botanist and author of gardening books	1884-05-27	1974-01-13	United States	
Helen Porter	British botanist	1899-11-10	1987-12-07		
Helen Sharsmith	American botanist	1905-08-26	1982-11-10	United States	
Helena Krzemieniewska	Polish botanist and microbiologist	1878	1966	Poland	
Helena Perpenti	Italian scientist (1764–1846)	1764	1846	Italy	
Hélène Durand	botanist (1883-1934)	1883-08	1934-08		
Helia Bravo	Mexican botanist	1901-09-30	2001-09-26	Mexico	
Henrietta Hooker	American botanist	1851-12-12	1929-05-13	United States	
Hildur Krog	Norwegian botanist	1922-03-22	2014-08-25	Norway	
Hiltje Maas-van de Kamer	Dutch botanist	1941-12-09		Kingdom of the Netherlands	
Ilma Grace Stone	Australian botanist	1913	2001		
Inez Clare Verdoorn	South African botanist	1896-06-15	1989	South Africa	
Inez M. Haring	US botanist	1875	1968	USA	
Inger Nordal	Norwegian botanist	1944-08-11		Norway	
Irene Manton	British botanist	1904-04-17	1988-05-13	United Kingdom	
Irina Grudzinskaya	Russian botanist	1920	2011		
Isabel Clifton Cookson	Australian botanist	1893-12-25	1973-07-01	Australia	
Isabella Abbott	Educator, ethnobotanist	1919-06-20	2010-10-28	United States	
Isabella Preston	botanist (1881-1965)	1881	1965		
Isobel Wylie Hutchison	Scottish Arctic traveller and botanist	1889	1982		
Janaki Ammal	Indian botanist	1897	1984-02	India	
Jane W. Loudon	English science fiction writer	1807-08-19	1858-07-13	United Kingdom	
Jane Colden	Botanist	1724-03-27	1766-03-10	United States	
Jane Glazebrook	American botanist				
Jane Ingham	English botanist and scientific translator	1897-08-15	1982-09-10	United Kingdom	
Janet Russell Perkins	American botanist and explorer (1853–1933)	1853	1933	United States	
Janet Sprent	British botanist	1934		United Kingdom	
Janice C. Beatley	American botanist and ecologist	1919-03-18	1987-11-14	United States	
Jantina Tammes	Dutch botanist and geneticist	1871-06-23	1947-09-20	Kingdom of the Netherlands	
Jayne V. Armstrong	British botanist			United Kingdom	
Jean Finnegan	Australian botanist				
Jean Galbraith	Australian botanist and writer	1906-03-28	1999-01-02	Australia	
Jean White-Haney	Australian botanist	1877-03-11	1952-10-21		
Jeanne Baré	French explorer	1740-07-27	1807-08-05	France	
Jenny Hempel	Danish botanist	1882-02-19	1975-02-13	Denmark	
Joan Cribb	Australian botanist	1930-04-14	2013-10-17	Australia	
Joan Dingley	New Zealand mycologist	1916-05-14	2008-01-01	New Zealand	
Lady Joan Margaret Legge	British botanist	1885-02-21	1939-07-04		
Joanne Chory	American plant biologist	1955-03-19	2024-11-12	United States	
Johanna Westerdijk	Dutch plant pathologist	1883-01-04	1961-11-15	Kingdom of the Netherlands	
Josephine Kablick	Czech scientist	1787	1863	Austrian Empire	
Joyce Lambert	Botanist	1916-06-23	2005-05-04		
Joyce Winifred Vickery	Australian botanist	1908-12-15	1979-05-29		
Judith Gay West	Australian botanist	1949		Australia	
Julia Morton	Botanist, Author	1912-04-25	1996-09-10	United States	
Julia Wilmotte Henshaw	Canadian botanist and writer	1869	1937	Canada	
Julie F. Barcelona	Filipino botanist	1972		Philippines	
Juliet Wege	Botanist	1971		Australia	
Juliette de Bairacli Levy	English herbalist and veterinarian	1912	2009	United Kingdom	
Kate Crooks	Canadian botanist	1833	1871	Canada	
Kate Sessions	American botanist and landscape architect	1857-11-08	1940-03-24	United States	
Katharina Perch-Nielsen	Swiss orienteer	1940-10-26		Switzerland	
Käthe Hoffmann	German botanist (1883–1960)	1883-08-01	1960-12-30	German Empire; Weimar Republic	
Katherine Esau	German-American botanist	1898-04-03	1997-06-04	United States	
Katherine Kane	Irish botanist	1811-03-18	1886-02-25	United Kingdom of Great Britain and Ireland	
Katherine Warington	British botanist	1897-09-05	1993-07-03		
Kathleen Anne Kron	biology professor; studies Ericaceae	1956			
Kathleen Basford	British botanist	1916-09-06	1998-12-20		
Kathleen Bever Blackburn	British botanist	1892	1968	United Kingdom	
Kathleen Maisey Curtis	Mycologist	1892-08-15	1994-09-05	New Zealand	
Kathleen Mary Drew-Baker	British phycologist	1901	1957		
Ladema Langdon		1893-01-05	1977-04		
Lady Anne Monson	English botanist and collector of plants and insects	1726	1776		
Leia Scheinvar	Mexican botanist	1954		Mexico	
Lela Viola Barton	Botanist, specializing in seeds.	1901-11-14	1967-07-31	United States	
Lena Clemmons Artz	American botanist	1891-08-03	1976-06-02	United States	
Libby Houston	Botanist	1941-12-09		United Kingdom	
Liivia Laasimer	Estonian botanist	1918-06-21	1988-02-26		
Lilian Clarke	botanist and teacher	1866-01-27	1934-02-12	United Kingdom	
Lilian Gibbs	Botanist	1870-09-10	1925-01-30	United Kingdom	
Lilian Snelling	Botanical illustrator	1879	1972-10-12	United Kingdom	
Lily May Perry	Canadian botanist (1895–1992)	1895-01-05	1992-03-11	United States	
Lily Newton	botanist (1893-1981)	1893-01-26	1981	United Kingdom	
Lilian E. Porter	Irish botanist and lichenologist (1885–1972)	1885-09-21	1972	Ireland	
Lois Brako	American botanist	1957-07-25		United States	
Louisa Grace Fortescue (née Butler), Lady Clermont	Irish botanist; discoverer of Lady Clermont's Spleenwort, Asplenium x clermontiae	1816-07-18	1896-11-8	Ireland	
Louise Guthrie	South African botanist (1879-1966)	1879-10-10	1966-02-20	South Africa	
Lucia McCulloch	American botanist	1873-02-26	1955-02-10	United States	
Lucy Beatrice Moore	Botanist, ecologist	1906-07-14	1987-06-09	New Zealand	
Lucy Cranwell	New Zealand botanist	1907-08-07	2000-06-08	New Zealand	
Ludmila Kuprianova	Russian botanist	1914-09	1987-01-13	Soviet Union	
Lumina Cotton Riddle Smyth	American botanist	1871-03-18	1939-02-02	United States	
Luisa Eugenia Navas	Chilean botanist	1920-07-27	2020-11-18	Chile	
Lula Pace	First female Baylor University professor with a PhD	1868	1925	United States	
Lynn G. Clark	American botanist	1956		United States	
Lynn Margulis	American evolutionary biologist	1938-03-05	2011-11-22	United States	
Maevia Noemí Correa	Argentinian botanist	1914-02-14	2005-04-18	Argentina	
Máirin de Valéra	Irish botanist	1912	1984		
Margaret A. Dix	British botanist	1939-05-19	2025-06-02	United Kingdom	
Margaret Adebisi Sowunmi	Nigerian botanist and environmental archaeologist	1939-09-24		Nigeria	
Margaret Bentinck, Duchess of Portland	British duchess	1715-02-11	1785-04-09	United Kingdom	
Margaret Clay Ferguson	American botanist	1863-08-29	1951-08-28	United States	
Margaret Elizabeth Barr-Bigelow	Canadian mycologist	1923-04-16	2008-04-01	Canada	
Margaret Gatty	British writer	1809-06-03	1873-10-04	United Kingdom	
Margaret Jane Benson	English botanist	1859	1936	United Kingdom	
Margaret Sibella Brown	Canadian bryologist	1866	1961	Canada	
Margaret Levyns	South AFrican botanist	1890-10-24	1975-11-11	South Africa	
Margery Claire Carlson	botanist (1892-1985)	1892-11-21	1985-07-05	United States	
Margot Williams	American botanist			United States	
Mari Reitalu	Estonian botanist	1941-02-10			
Maria Fadiman	Botanist	1969-07-04		United States	
Maria Gugelberg von Moos	Swiss botanist	1836	1918	Switzerland	
Maria Jacson	English writer	1755	1829-10-10	United Kingdom	
Maria Koepcke	German and Peruvian ornithologist	1924-05-15	1971-12-24	Germany	
Maria Wilman	South African botanist	1867-04-29	1957-11-09	South Africa	
Marian Farquharson	Naturalist, women's rights activist	1846-07-02	1912-04-20	United Kingdom	
Marie Beatrice Schol-Schwarz	Dutch phytopathologist	1898-07-12	1969-07-27	Kingdom of the Netherlands	
Marie Jean-Eudes Tellier	Religious Sister and botanist	1897	1978	Canada	
Marie Prins	South African botanist	1948		South Africa	
Marie Stopes	British paleontologist	1880-10-15	1958-10-02	United Kingdom	
Marie Taylor	American botanist	1911	1990-12	United States	
Marie-Anne Libert	Belgian botanist	1782-04-07	1865-01-14	Belgium	
Marie-Hélène Sachet	French botanist	1922	1986	France	
Marietta Pallis	Greek-British ecologist	1882	1963		
Marion Delf-Smith	British botanist	1883-01-31	1980-02-23	United Kingdom	
Marion E. Moodie	Canadian botanist	1867	1958		
Marjorie Elizabeth Jane Chandler	English palaeobotanist	1897-05-18	1983-10-01	United Kingdom	
Mary Agard Pocock	South African phycologist	1886	1977-07-20	South Africa	
Mary Agnes Chase	American botanical illustrator and botanist	1869-04-29	1963-09-24	United States	
Mary Albertson	American botanist	1838-06-21	1914-08-19	United States	
Mary Ann Robb	Botanist	1829	1912		
Mary Bowerman	American botanist	1908-01-25	2005-08-21	United States	
Mary Elizabeth Barber	British naturalist, South African biologist	1818-01-05	1899-09-04	United Kingdom	
Mary Gibson Henry	Botanist	1884	1967	United States	
Mary K. Bryan	American botanist	1877-02-13	1926	United States	
Mary Katharine Brandegee	American botanist	1844-10-28	1920-04-03	United States	
Mary Pirie	Scottish botanist and teacher	1822-01-20	1885-02-08	Scotland	
Mary Somerset, Duchess of Beaufort	English noblewoman, gardener and botanist, died 1715	1630-12-16	1715-01-07	United Kingdom	
Mary Sophie Young	American botanist	1872-09-20	1919	United States	
Mary Strong Clemens	American botanist	1873-01-03	1968-04-13	United States	
Mary Sutherland	Forester, botanist	1893	1955	New Zealand	
Mary Therese Kalin Arroyo	New Zealand botanist	1944		New Zealand	
Mary Tindale	Botanist	1920-09-19	2011-03-31		
Mary Treat	American biologist	1830-09-07	1923-04-11	United States	
Mary Wharton	American botanist	1912-10-12	1991	United States	
Matilda Cullen Knowles	Irish botanist	1864-01-31	1933-04-27; 1933-04-23	Ireland	
Matilda Smith	Botanical illustrator	1854	1926	United Kingdom	
Maureen Ann Donnelly		1954-08-10			
Meenakshi Banerjee	Indian cyanobacteriologist			India	
Mildred Adams Fenton	American scientist	1899-11-14	1995-12-07	United States	
Mildred Ester Mathias	American botanist	1906-09-19	1995-02-16	United States	
Miriam Phoebe de Vos	South African botanist	1912	2005	South Africa	
Monique Keraudren	French botanist	1928-12-08	1981-05-25	France	
Nancy Adams	botanist and botanical artist	1926-05-19	2007-03-27	New Zealand	
Nancy Tyson Burbidge	Australian botanist, conservationist and herbarium curator	1912-08-05	1977-03-04	Australia	
Naomi Feinbrun	Botanist, University Professor	1900	1995-03-08	Russian Empire; Romania; Israel	
Nélida María Bacigalupo	Argentinian botanist	1924	2019	Argentina	
Nellie Adalesa Brown	American botanist	1876	1956	United States	
Nina Avgustinovna Adolf	Russian botanist	1903	1951		
Nina Golubkova	Russian lichenologist	1932-01-28	2009-08-24	Russia	
Nora Lilian Alcock	Pioneering plant pathologist	1874-08-18	1972-03-31		
Norah Lillian Penston	British botanist and academic administrator	1903-08-20	1974-02-01		
Nuncia María Tur	Argentinian botanist	1940		Argentina	
O.F. Mizgireva	botanist and painter (1908-2000)	1908	2000	Soviet Union	
Olga Fédchenko	Russian botanist	1845-10-30	1921-04-24	Russian Empire	
Olive Blanche Davies	Australian botanical artist	1884-10-27	1976-10-20	Australia	
Olive Mary Hilliard	South African botanist	1925-07-04	2022	South Africa	
Orra White Hitchcock	American woman botanical artist	1796-03-08	1863-05-26	United States	
Ottoline Leyser	British botanist	1965-03-07			
Pamela S. Soltis	American botanist	1957-11-13		United States	
Pamela Woods	British botanist	1952		United Kingdom	
Pat Wolseley	Botanist	1938		United Kingdom	
Patricia Berjak	South African botanist	1939-12-29	2015-01-21	South Africa	
Patricia G. Gensel	American paleobotanist	1944			
Paula J. Rudall	botanist	1954			
Paula Pryke	British botanist	1960-04-29		United Kingdom	
Pauline Dy Phon	Cambodian botanist (1933-2010)	1933	2010-05-21	Cambodia	
Pauline Ladiges	Australian botanist	1948-01-19; 1948		Australia	
Phoebe Lankester	Lankester [née Pope], Phebe [pseud. Penelope] (1825–1900), writer on botany and health	1825-04-10; 1825	1900-04-09; 1900		
Phyllis Clinch	Irish botanist	1901-09-12	1984-10-19		
Pippa Greenwood	British botanist			United Kingdom	
Princess Theresa of Bavaria	Bavarian princess, scientist, philanthropist	1850-11-12	1925-12-19; 1925-09-19	Germany	
Priscilla Susan Bury	British botanist	1799-01-12	1872-03-08	United Kingdom	
Rana Ellen Munns	Australian botanist				
Rica Erickson	Australian historian and botanist	1908-08-10	2009-09-08	Australia	
Rosa Olga Sansom	Teacher, museum director, botanist, broadcaster, writer	1900	1989	New Zealand	
Rosamund Flora Shove	British botanist	1878	1954-10-17	United Kingdom	
Roseli Ocampo-Friedmann	Filipino-American microbiologist and botanist	1937-11-23	2005-09-04	United States	
Rosette Batarda Fernandes	Portuguese scientist	1916-01-10	2005-05-28	Portugal	
Rosmarie Honegger	Swiss lichenologist	1947		Switzerland	
Roxana Judkins Stinchfield Ferris	American botanist	1895-04-13	1978-06-30	United States	
Ruth Colvin Starrett McGuire	American Botanist	1893	1950	United States	
Ruth F. Allen	American botanist and plant pathologist	1879	1963	United States	
Ruth Kiew	Malaysian-British botanist	1946			
Ruth Mason	New Zealand botanist	1913-11-07; 1913	1990-05-14; 1990	New Zealand	
Ruth Patrick	American botanist and limnologist	1907-11-26	2013-09-23	United States	
Sandra Knapp	botanist	1956-12-09; 1956			
Sara Plummer Lemmon	American botanist	1836-09-03	1923	United States	
Sarah Bowdich Lee	English naturalist and author	1791-09-10	1856-09-22	United Kingdom of Great Britain and Ireland	
Sarah Darwin	English botanist	1964-04-14		United Kingdom	
Sarah Martha Baker	British botanist	1887-06-04	1917-05-29	United Kingdom	
Sarah Paxon Moore Cooper	American botanist and botanical collector	1824-09-18	1908-03-13	United States	
Shirley Sherwood	Botanist	1933-07-01		United Kingdom	
Shakti M. Gupta	Ethnobotanist	1927		Lahore, Pakistan	
Shiu-Ying Hu	Chinese botanist	1908-02-26	2012-05-22	People's Republic of China	
Silvia Blumenfeld	Argentine mycologist	1949		Argentina	
Silvia Zenari	Italian botanist	1895-03-31	1956-06-30	Italy	
Siri von Reis	American botanist and writer	1931-02-10	2021-08-03	United States	
Sophia Eckerson	American botanist		1954-07-19	United States	
Sophie Charlotte Ducker	botanist (1909-2004)	1909	2004		
Stella Grace Maisie Carr	Australian ecologist	1912-02-26	1988-09-09	Australia	
Stella Ross-Craig	British artist	1906-03-19	2006-02-06		
Susan Carter Holmes	British botanist	1933		United Kingdom	
Susanne Renner	German botanist	1954-10-05		Germany	
Suzanne Mary Prober	Australian botanist	1964		Australia	
Thekla Resvoll	Norwegian botanist	1871-05-22	1948-06-14	Norway	
Theodora Lisle Prankerd	British botanist	1878-06-21	1939-11-11	United Kingdom	
Thistle Yolette Harris	Australian botanist	1902-07-29	1990-07-05		
Tiiu Kull	Estonian botanist	1958-08-26			
Tracy L. Kahn	American botanist			United States	
Ülle Kukk	Estonian botanist and conservationist	1937-11-18			
Ursula Katharine Duncan	British botanist	1910-09-17	1985-01-27	United Kingdom	
Vandika Ervandovna Avetisyan	Armenian botanist and mycologist	1928-10-5		Armenia; Soviet Union	
Vera Scarth-Johnson	Botanist	1912	1999		
Victoria Ann Funk	American botanist	1947-11-26	2019-10-22	United States	
Violet Dickson	English botanist, writer, and Orientalist	1896-09-03	1991-01-04		
Vivi Laurent-Täckholm	Swedish botanist	1898-01-07	1978	Sweden	
Vivienne Cassie Cooper	New Zealand planktologist and botanist	1926-09-29	2021-07-05	New Zealand	
Wanda Kirkbride Farr	US botanist	1895-01-09	1983	United States	
Wanda Zabłocka	Polish botanist, phytopathologist, mycologist	1900-12-20	1978-11-30	Poland	
Winifred Brenchley	British botanist	1883-08-10	1953-10-27		
Winifred Curtis	British–Australian botanist	1905-06-15	2005-10-14	Australia	
Winifred Mary Page	British botanist	1887	1965-3-9		
Ynes Mexia	Mexican botanist	1870-05-24	1938-07-12	United States; Mexico	
Yolande Dalpé	botanist	1948			
Zinaida Botschantzeva	Russian botanist and embryologist, professor	1907-08-10	1973-08-17	Soviet Union	
Zoraida Luces de Febres	Venezuelan botanist specializing in grasses	1922	2015	Venezuela	

== See also ==
- List of botanists
- Lists of women
