= Alice Haskins =

American botanist (1880–1971)

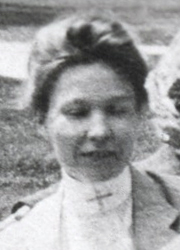
- Born: April 24, 1880; Acton, Massachusetts
- Died: October 16, 1971 (aged 91); Santa Clara, California
- Education: Smith College
- Spouse: Deane Bret Swingle
- Scientific career
- Fields: Botany
- Workplaces: U.S. Department of Agriculture

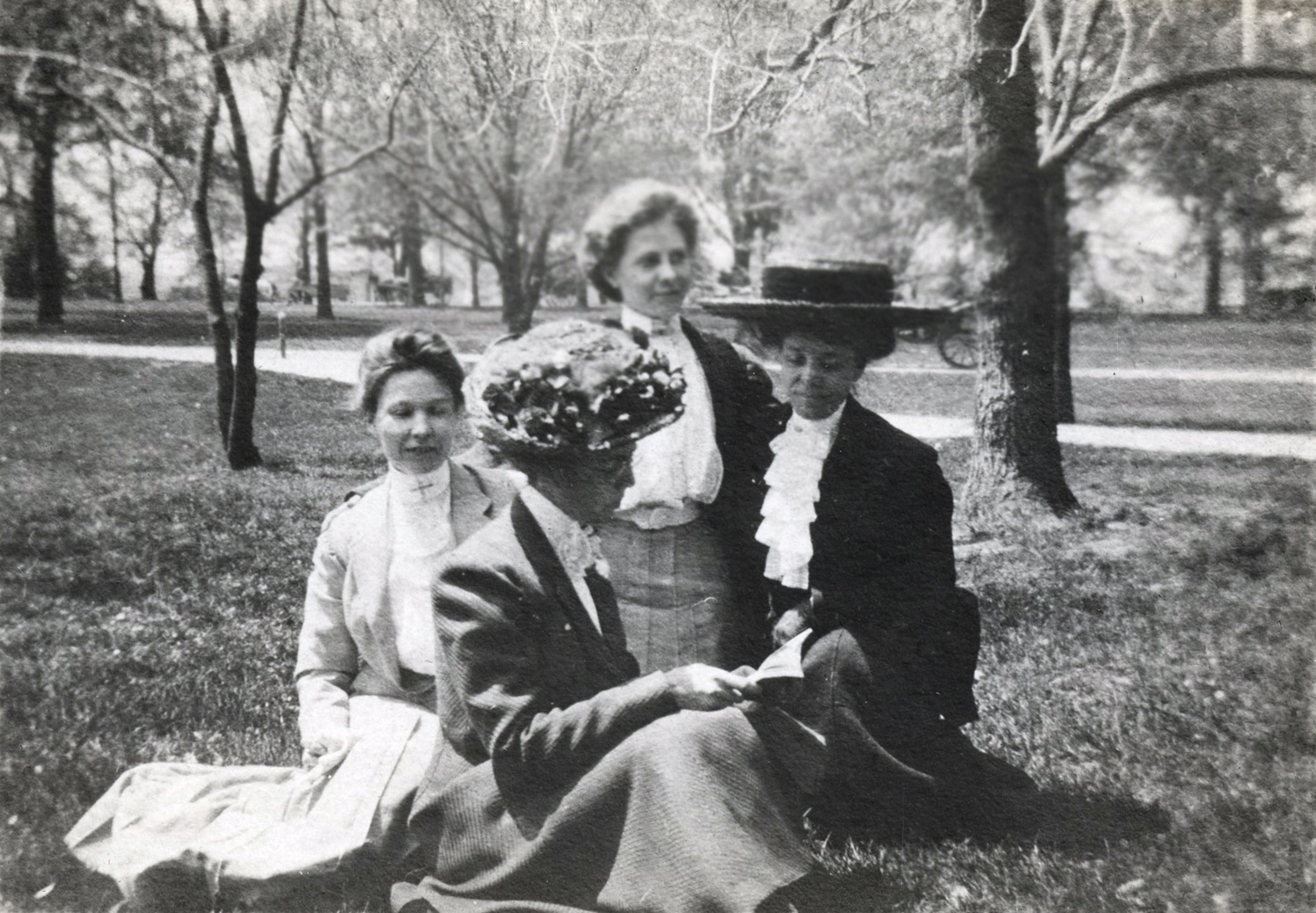
(left to right) Possibly Alice Haskins, Lucia McCulloch, Clara H. Hasse and Mary K. Berger

Alice Crane Haskins Swingle (1880–1971) was an American government botanist. With her husband, botanist Deane Bret Swingle (1879–1944), she co-authored the 1928 book A Textbook of Systematic Botany.

== Life and career ==
Haskins was born on 24 April 1880, in Acton, Massachusetts to Helen A. Crane and John R. Haskins. She graduated with a bachelor's degree from Smith College in 1903. Haskins worked as a research assistant in the Plant Pathology Laboratory of the United States Department of Agriculture from 1903 to 1906.

Erwin Frink Smith, the U.S. Department of Agriculture's plant pathologist-in-charge, regularly employed women botanists in the Bureau of Plant Industry to study plant diseases. Haskins was among the group, which included Nellie A. Brown, Clara H. Hasse, Florence Hedges, Agnes J. Quirk, Della Watkins, and Mary K. Bryan working on such agricultural problems as crown galls, citrus cankers, and corn and chestnut blight.

In 1906, she married Swingle, a fellow botanist and laboratory colleague, then moved to Bozeman, Montana, where Swingle became Professor of Botany and Bacteriology at Montana State College of Agriculture (later Montana State University).

Haskins died on 16 October 1971, in Santa Clara, California.
