= Angie Beckwith =

American phytopathologist (1881–1964)

Angie Maria Beckwith
- Born: 27 January 1881
- Died: 2 October 1964 (aged 83)
- Known for: Botany, Plant pathology
- Scientific career
- Institutions: United States Department of Agriculture

Angie Maria Beckwith (27 January 1881 – 2 October 1964) was an American phytopathologist, at the primary pathology laboratory at the USDA's Bureau of Plant Industry under Erwin F. Smith and Florence Hedges during the 1920s.

In 1921, Beckwith was one of more than twenty women who worked in Smith's lab, and who were credited with studying bacterial wilt in new dry beans. Among her cohort were several notable mycologists and botanists including Charlotte Elliott, Nellie A. Brown, Edith Cash, Mary Katherine Bryan, Anna Jenkins, and Lucia McCulloch, Pearle Smith.

She was a member of the Mycological Society of America and published regularly in the Bulletin of the Torrey Botanical Club.
