= Fraine (surname) =

Fraine is a surname.

Notable people with the surname include:

- Ethel de Fraine (1879–1918), British botanist
- Greg Fraine (born 1962), New Zealand cyclist
- John H. Fraine (1861–1943), Lieutenant Governor of North Dakota
- Katie Fraine (born 1987), American soccer player
- Will Fraine (born 1996), English cricketer

== See also ==
- Fraine, an Italian commune
