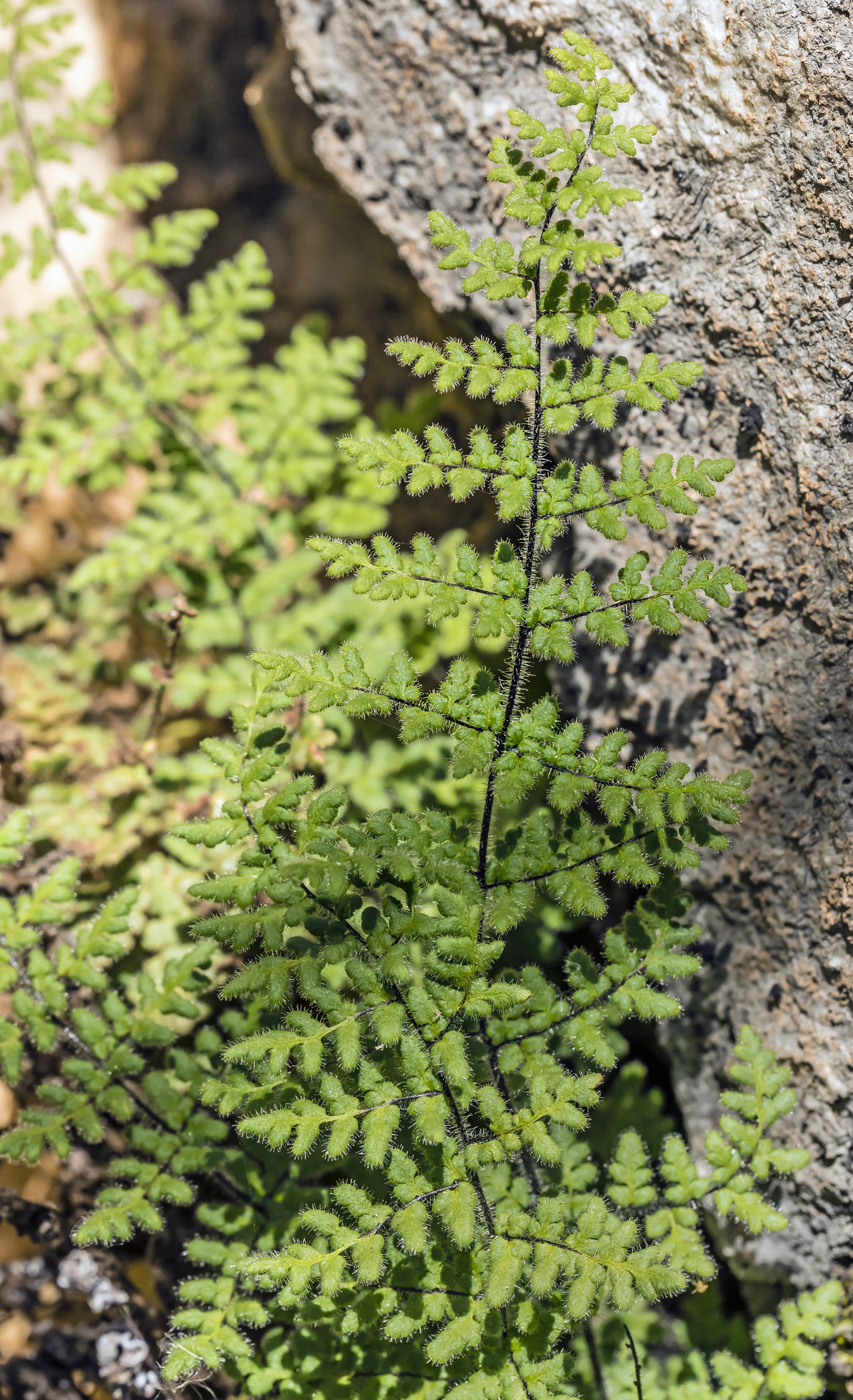
- Frond of M. cooperae

Conservation status
- Vulnerable (NatureServe)

Scientific classification
- Kingdom: Plantae
- Clade: Embryophytes
- Clade: Tracheophytes
- Division: Polypodiophyta
- Class: Polypodiopsida
- Order: Polypodiales
- Family: Pteridaceae
- Genus: Myriopteris
- Species: M. cooperae

Binomial name
- Myriopteris cooperae (D.C.Eaton) Grusz & Windham

Synonyms
- Allosorus cooperae (D.C.Eaton) Farw.; Cheilanthes cooperae D.C.Eaton; Hemionitis cooperae (D.C.Eaton) Christenh.

= Myriopteris cooperae =

Cooper's lip fern

Species of fern

Myriopteris cooperae, commonly called (Mrs.) Cooper's lip fern, is a small fern endemic to California. Its leaves grow in clusters and are highly dissected into oblong segments, rather than the beadlike segments found in some other members of the genus. The axes of the leaves are dark and covered in long, flattened hairs. One of the cheilanthoid lip ferns, it was usually classified in the genus Cheilanthes as Cheilanthes cooperae until 2013, when the genus Myriopteris was again recognized as separate from Cheilanthes. It grows in rocky habitats, usually over limestone. The species was named in honor of its collector, Sarah Paxson Cooper; according to Daniel Cady Eaton, who described it in 1875, it was the first fern species to be named for a female botanist.

== Description ==
The rhizomes are short with closely-spaced leaf bases, typically 4 to 8 millimeters (0.2 to 0.3 in) in diameter, and upright or ascending rather than horizontal. The rhizome bears persistent scales, whose shape ranges from linear-subulate to linear-lanceolate or lanceolate. They are brown or tan to reddish-brown in color, more or less uniform in color or darkening towards the tip.

The fronds arise from the rhizome in clusters, reaching a size from 5 to 30 centimeters (2 to 10 in) long, (occasionally to 32 centimeters (13 in) or more), and 3 to 6 centimeters (1 to 2 in) wide (occasionally to 8 centimeters (3.1 in) or more). They emerge as fiddleheads (circinate vernation). The stipe (the stalk of the leaf below the blade) is 1.5 to 8 centimeters (0.59 to 3.1 in) long and less than 2 millimeters (0.08 in) wide, flattened or with a slight groove in the upper surface, and generally dark brown in color, ranging from reddish-brown to purplish-black. It is covered with many long, flattened hairs.

The leaf blades are linear-oblong to lanceolate-ovate or elliptic-lanceolate in overall shape, typically 3 to 15 centimeters (1.2 to 5.9 in) long and 1.5 to 5 centimeters (0.59 to 2.0 in) wide. They are typically tripinnate (cut into pinnae, pinnules, and pinnulets) at the base; the pinnulets may be pinnatifid. The rachis (leaf axis) is similar in morphology to the stipe, which it extends: dark, rounded or slightly groove above, and covered with the same type of hairs. Scales are absent.

At the base of each pinna, the dark color of the costa continues into the pinna base; there is no distinct joint between stalk and leaf. The basal pinnae are slightly smaller than the pair just above them. The upper surfaces of the costae (pinna axes) are green (rather than dark) for most of their length. The pinnules are oblong, truncate to obtuse at the base and round at the apex. The smallest divisions of the leaf are linear-oblong to obovate in shape, rather than beadlike as in many species of Myriopteris. They are typically 1 to 5 millimeters (0.04 to 0.2 in), the largest of them being from 3 to 5 millimeters (0.1 to 0.2 in) in length. Long, flattened hairs like those of the stipe and rachis are abundant on both side of the leaf blade.

On fertile fronds, the edge of the leaf folds under to form a false indusium from 0.05 to 0.25 mm wide. The tissue of the false indusia is only weakly differentiated from that of the rest of the leaf blade. Beneath the false indusia, the sori are broken into segments, most concentrated near the apex of the leaf segments and in their lateral lobes. Each sporangium contains 64 tan spores, typical of sexually reproducing species within the genus. Individual sporophytes have a diploid chromosome number of 2n = 60.

M. cooperae is similar to M. viscida, a species of California and Baja California, but lacks the glandular pubescence of the latter, and does not overlap it in range.

== Taxonomy ==
The species was first described as Cheilanthes cooperae by D. C. Eaton in 1875, from material collected by Sarah Paxson Cooper near Santa Barbara, California and by John Gill Lemmon in Sierra Valley. Both syntypes are at the Yale herbarium. Eaton named the species for Cooper: the first American fern, according to him, to be named in honor of a female botanist. By a strict application of the principle of priority, Oliver Atkins Farwell transferred the species to the genus Allosorus as Allosorus cooperae in 1931, that genus having been published before Cheilanthes. Farwell's name was rendered unnecessary when Cheilanthes was conserved over Allosorus in the Paris Code published in 1956.

The development of molecular phylogenetic methods showed that the traditional circumscription of Cheilanthes is polyphyletic. Convergent evolution in arid environments is thought to be responsible for widespread homoplasy in the morphological characters traditionally used to classify it and the segregate genera that have sometimes been recognized. On the basis of molecular evidence, Amanda Grusz and Michael D. Windham revived the genus Myriopteris in 2013 for a group of species formerly placed in Cheilanthes. One of these was C. cooperae, which thus became Myriopteris cooperae.

In 2018, Maarten J. M. Christenhusz transferred the species to Hemionitis as H. cooperae, as part of a program to consolidate the cheilanthoid ferns into that genus.

Members of the genus Cheilanthes as historically defined (which includes Myriopteris) are commonly known as "lip ferns" due to the lip-like (false) indusium formed by the leaf margins curling over the sori. The common name (Mrs.) Cooper's lip fern refers to the collector honored by the epithet.

Further molecular studies in Myriopteris demonstrated the existence of three well-supported clades within the genus. M. cooperae belongs to what Grusz et al. informally named the lanosa clade. Within this clade, M. cooperae is sister to all other species except M. viscida, which is sister to M. cooperae plus the rest of the clade. The lanosa clade is distinguished from all other species of the genus, except M. wrightii, by forming fiddleheads as leaves emerge. The basal grade of M. cooperae and M. viscida is distinguished from the rest of the clade by their flattened rachides.

== Distribution and habitat ==
It is endemic to California, where it is widespread but not very common. It can be found growing in crevices in rocky habitat, generally on limestone, in chaparral and other habitats. It is found between 100 and 700 meters (300 and 2,000 ft) in altitude.

== Conservation ==
NatureServe considers M. cooperae globally vulnerable (G3) due to its limited distribution, although it is not considered threatened within California.

== See also ==
- California chaparral and woodlands
  - California interior chaparral and woodlands
  - Coastal sage scrub

== Notes and references ==
=== Works cited ===
- Christenhusz, Maarten J. M.; Fay, Michael F.; Byng, James W. (2018). Plant Gateway's the Global Flora: A practical flora to vascular plant species of the world. Vol. 4. ISBN 978-0-9929993-9-1.
- Clute, Willard N. (1901). Our Ferns in Their Haunts. New York: Frederick A. Stokes Co.
- Eaton, D.C. (1875). "New or Little-Known Ferns of the United States". Bulletin of the Torrey Botanical Club. 6 (5): 33. doi:10.2307/2476219. JSTOR 2476219.
- Farwell, Oliver Atkins (1931). "Fern Notes II. Ferns in the Herbarium of Parke, Davis & co". American Midland Naturalist. 12 (8): 233–311. doi:10.2307/2420088. JSTOR 2420088.
- Grusz, Amanda L.; Windham, Michael D. (2013). "Toward a monophyletic Cheilanthes: The resurrection and recircumscription of Myriopteris (Pteridaceae)". PhytoKeys (32): 49–64. doi:10.3897/phytokeys.32.6733. PMC 3881352. PMID 24399906.
- Grusz, Amanda L.; Windham, Michael D.; Yatskievych, George; Huiet, Layne; Gastony, Gerald J.; Pryer, Kathleen M. (2014). "Patterns of Diversification in the Xeric-adapted Fern Genus Myriopteris (Pteridaceae)". Systematic Botany. 39 (3): 698–714. doi:10.1600/036364414X681518. JSTOR 24546228. PMC 4651630. PMID 26649266.
- Kartesz, John T. (2014). "Myriopteris". Biota of North America Program.
- Kirkpatrick, Ruth E.B.; Smith, Alan R.; Lemieux, Thomas; Alverson, Edward, eds. (2014). "Myriopteris cooperae". Jepson eFlora, Revision 2. Jepson Flora Project.
- Lellinger, David B. (1985). A Field Manual of the Ferns & Fern-Allies of the United States & Canada. Washington, DC: Smithsonian Institution Press. ISBN 0-87474-603-5.
- NatureServe (June 28, 2026). "Myriopteris cooperae". NatureServe Explorer. Arlington, Virginia.
- Windham, Michael D.; Rabe, Eric W. (1993). "Cheilanthes cooperae". In Flora of North America Editorial Committee (ed.). Flora of North America North of Mexico. Vol. 2: Pteridophytes and Gymnosperms. New York and Oxford: Oxford University Press.
