= Swingle =

Swingle may refer to:

== Swingle as a surname ==
- Alice Haskins Swingle, an American government botanist
- Lyman Alexander Swingle, member of the Governing Body of Jehovah's Witnesses and related offices
- Marion Stroud Swingle (1939–2015), American curator, author, and museum director.
- Paul Swingle (born 1966), former Major League Baseball pitcher
- Rich Swingle, American film actor, screenwriter and stage actor
- Ward Swingle (1927–2015), musician, singer, arranger, founder of the Swingle Singers
- Walter Tennyson Swingle (1871–1952), U.S. agricultural botanist

== Other uses ==
- The Swingles is a vocal octet founded by Ward Swingle.
- A swingle is the swinging part of a flail that is used on a farm, for threshing

== See also ==
- Swingletree
