= Male privilege =

Social privilege of men

Male privilege is the system of advantages or rights that are available to men on the basis of their sex. A man's access to these benefits may vary depending on how closely they match their society's ideal masculine norm.

Academic studies of male privilege were a focus of feminist scholarship during the 1970s. These studies began by examining barriers to equity between the sexes. In later decades, researchers began to focus on the intersectionality and overlapping nature of privileges relating to sex, race, social class, sexual orientation, and other forms of social classification.

== Overview ==
Special privileges and status are granted to males in patriarchal societies. These are societies defined by male supremacy, in which males hold primary power and predominate in roles of political leadership, moral authority, social privilege and control of property. With systemic subordination of women, males gain economic, political, social, educational, and practical advantages that are more or less unavailable to women. The long-standing and unquestioned nature of such patriarchal systems, reinforced over generations, tends to make privilege invisible to holders; it can lead males who benefit from such privilege to ascribe their special status to their own individual merits and achievements, rather than to unearned advantages.

In the field of sociology, male privilege is seen as embedded in the structure of social institutions, as when men are often assigned authority over women in the workforce, and benefit from women's traditional caretaking role. Privileges can be classified as either positive or negative, depending on how they affect the rest of society. Women's studies scholar Peggy McIntosh writes:

We might at least start by distinguishing between positive advantages that we can work to spread, to the point where they are not advantages at all but simply part of the normal civic and social fabric, and negative types of advantage that unless rejected will always reinforce our present hierarchies.

Some negative advantages accompanying male privilege include such things as the expectation that a man will have a better chance than a comparably qualified woman of being hired for a job, as well as being paid more than a woman for the same job.

== Scope ==
The term "male privilege" does not apply to a solitary occurrence of the use of power, but rather describes one of many systemic power structures that are interdependent and interlinked throughout societies and cultures.

Privilege is not shared equally by all males. Abhijit Das argues that understanding male privilege requires understanding both the pressures placed on men by traditional gender roles and also the systematic advantages they receive. Das emphasizes that these pressures and advantages are not equal for all men, but vary depending on factors such as race, class, caste, etc. Research by Das shows that maintaining attention on male weaknesses hurts our ability to discover the advantages men receive based on sex along with their social dominance. The process of fighting persistent gender inequality requires male involvement to study how patriarchal advantage benefits individual men while also understanding how such benefits overlap with other factors determining social standing.

Those who most closely match an ideal masculine norm benefit the most from privilege. In Western patriarchal societies this ideal has been described as being "white, heterosexual, stoic, wealthy, strong, tough, competitive, and autonomous". Men's studies scholars refer to this ideal masculine norm as hegemonic masculinity. While essentially all males benefit from privilege to some degree, those who visibly differ from the norm may not benefit fully in certain situations, especially in the company of other men that more closely match it.

Men who have experienced bullying and domestic violence in youth, in particular, may not accept the idea that they are beneficiaries of privilege. Such forms of coercive violence are linked to the idea of toxic masculinity, a specific model of manhood that creates hierarchies of dominance in which some are favored and others are harmed.

Men's interpretations of their bullying experiences vary depending on how closely they conformed to hegemonic masculine norms and how satisfied they are with their current lives. However, regardless of their position within those hierarchies, they often view it as a space that shaped and formed their adult lives. All in all, the issue of power remains central. Whether they experienced social privilege or marginalization, men frequently tend to frame their stories around personal influence which results in placing themselves within a dominant gender ideology that defines masculinity in very narrow and restricted ways.

== Workforce inequality ==
The invisibility of male privilege can be seen for instance in discussions of the gender pay gap in the United States; the gap is usually referred to by stating women's earnings as a percentage of men's. However, using women's pay as the baseline highlights the dividend that males receive as greater earnings (32% in 2005). In commerce, male dominance in the ownership and control of financial capital and other forms of wealth has produced disproportionate male influence over the working classes and the hiring and firing of employees. In addition, a disproportionate burden is placed upon women in employment when they are expected to be solely responsible for child care; they may be more likely to be fired or be denied advancement in their profession, thus putting them at an economic disadvantage relative to men.

Studies show a pattern across labor markets resulting in women more frequently leave paid employment due to familial obligations like marriage, pregnancy, and childcare. In contrast, men are more likely to move between jobs without exiting the workforce entirely. Due to these expectations being socially imposed rather than biologically determined, women face interrupted career trajectories that then limit economic flexibility. Meanwhile, men's sustained participation in the workforce allows for them to gain experience and financial security which highlights a structural form implemented within employment systems.

== Sports and media ==
Discussions about male privilege are particularly visible in the context of athletics and the way sports are represented in society and media. The field of sports has historically been written as a masculine space in which women tend to be excluded, and it continues to be a male dominated institution across the world. Although women's participation has grown and they are experiencing the benefits associated with athletic activity, the structural and cultural barriers continue to frame sports as primarily belonging to men. It is barriers like these that reinforce the idea that rewards and recognition connected to sports participation are naturally tied to masculinity.

The culture of athletics highlights hegemonic masculine ideals that suggest certain sports, behaviors, and values are more appropriate for men than women. There are policies such as Title IX that expanded the opportunities for women in athletics, but research shows that women's sports and female athletes are still frequently marginalized when compared to men's sports. With this comes lower pay and fewer resources for women's teams, even when they achieve comparable or greater success.

Research suggests that similar patterns of male privilege exist within sports media and related industries. The media coverage of women's sports has not expanded at the same pace as men's sports, and in some cases it has simply declined. Men's sports and male athletes receive the overwhelming majority of media attention which reinforces the perception that men's sports are more important or valuable than women's sports.

Advertising for sports showcase similar gender inequality. Male athletes dominate endorsement deals, sponsorships, and marketing campaigns. Female athletes remain underrepresented in these promotional materials. The issue may be even more significant for athletes who fall outside of the traditional gender binary, such as transgender athletes, and who face additional social and institutional challenges within competitive sports. Additionally, sports media outlets tend to highlight and celebrate presumed biological differences between male and female athletes. This separation continues to normalize the idea that men's and women's sports exist in fundamentally different spheres.

== Scholarship ==
The earliest academic studies of privilege appeared with feminist scholars' work in the area of women's studies during the 1970s. Such scholarship began by examining barriers to equity between the sexes. In later decades, researchers began to focus on the intersectionality and overlapping nature of privileges relating to sex, race, social class, sexual orientation, and other forms of social classification.

Peggy McIntosh, one of the first feminist scholars to examine male privilege, wrote about both male privilege and white privilege, using the metaphor of the "invisible knapsack" to describe a set of advantages borne, often unaware and unacknowledged, by members of privileged groups. According to McIntosh, privilege is not a result of a concerted effort to oppress those of the opposite gender; however, the inherent benefits that men gain from the systemic bias put women at an innate disadvantage. The benefits of this unspoken privilege may be described as special provisions, tools, relationships, or various other opportunities. According to McIntosh, this privilege may actually negatively affect men's development as human beings, and few question that the existing structure of advantages may be challenged or changed.

Efforts to examine the role of privilege in students' lives has become a regular feature of university education in North America. By drawing attention to the presence of privilege (including male, white, and other forms) in the lives of students, educators have sought to foster insights that can help students contribute to social justice. Such efforts include McIntosh's "invisible knapsack" model of privilege and the "Male Privilege Checklist".

Psychologist Tomas Chamorro-Premuzic proposes that incompetent men are disproportionately promoted into leadership positions because instead of testing rigorously for competence, employers are attracted to confidence, charisma, and narcissism.

== Cultural responses ==
Advocates for men's rights and father's rights as well as anti-feminist men often accept that men's traditional roles are damaging to males but deny they as a group still have institutional power and privilege, and argue that men in the 21st century are now victims relative to women.

Some have taken active roles in challenging oppressive sexism and misogyny, arguing that male privilege is deeply linked to the oppression of women. They describe men's oppressive behaviors as cultural traits learned within patriarchal social systems, rather than inborn biological traits. Advocates within the broader men's movement oriented towards profeminism or anti-sexism argue that traditional gender roles harm both men and women. "Liberal" profeminism tends to stress the ways men suffer from these traditional roles, while more "radical" profeminism tends to emphasize male privilege and sexual inequality. Some men may also be advocates of women's rights but deny that their privilege as a whole is a part of the issue at hand.

== Preference of sons over daughters ==
In both India and China, male offspring are often favored over female children. Some manifestations of son preference and the devaluation of women are eliminating unwanted daughters through neglect, maltreatment, abandonment, as well as female infanticide and feticide despite laws that prohibit infanticide and sex-selective pregnancy termination. In India some of these practices have contributed to skewed sex ratios in favor of male children at birth and in the first five years. Other examples of privileging male offspring are special "praying for a son" ceremonies during pregnancy, more ceremony and festivities following the birth of a boy, listing and introducing sons before daughters, and common felicitations that associate good fortune and well-being with the number of sons.

Reasons given for preferring sons to daughters include sons' role in religious family rites, which daughters are not permitted to perform, and the belief that sons are permanent members of the birth family whereas daughters belong to their husband's family after marriage in accordance with patrilocal tradition. Other reasons include patrilineal customs whereby only sons can carry on the family name, the obligation to pay dowry to a daughter's husband or his family, and the expectation that sons will support their birth parents financially while it is regarded as undesirable or shameful to receive financial support from daughters.

According to Becker (1981), there is a difference in the financial investments parents make for daughters versus sons due to societal structures. Parents may not consider sons to be more intelligent, but they are at different advantages. Parents may account for gender inequalities in wages, business participation, and status that shape how families distribute educational resources. Some parents are stated to increase the investment in a daughters' education in anticipation that women must earn higher credentials to match men's earnings. In contrary, viewpoints on human capital suggest that parents are highly likely to invest in sons because they are perceived to have much higher and long term potential.

== Nuances in male privilege ==
Darren Austin discovered that people who oppose gender equality policies through anti-egalitarian beliefs will tend to deny male privilege exists. The authors studied Australians who explained away gender discrimination through merit-based assessments which attribute inequality to individual ability instead of systemic inequality. Anti-egalitarian views together with traditional gender-beliefs shape male perspectives on privilege dynamics therefore sustaining systemic gender discrimination hierarchies.

Karin Schwiter found that men working in female-dominated professions, such as childcare and nursing, were often treated more favorably because of their rarity. While these men recognized the advantages they received, they often tried to justify this treatment by pointing to their personal skills or by highlighting physical traits like strength or a deeper voice. In doing so, they framed their privilege as earned and legitimate, rather than unearned. By framing their privilege this way, they avoided deeper conversations about systemic gender inequality and ended up reinforcing traditional gender roles in their workplaces.

== See also ==
- Androcentrism
- Anti-discrimination law
- Chauvinism
- Gender
- Gender marking in job titles
- Gender bias on Wikipedia
- Harem effect (science)
- Honorary male
- Generic antecedent
- Global Gender Gap Report
- Male as norm
