= Alfred Fischer (botanist) =

German botanist (1858–1913)

Alfred Fischer (17 December 1858 – 1913) was a German botanist. His is known for his dispute with Erwin Frink Smith over the role of bacteria in plant pathology.

Fischer was born in Meissen, Germany. Fischer lectured in botany at the University of Leipzig.

== Selected works ==
- Die Plasmolyse der Bakterien (1891)
- Untersuchungen über bakterien (1894)
- Vorlesungen über Bakterien (1897)
- Beiträge zur kenntnis der physiologie und verbreitung denitrifizierender thiosulfat-bakterien (1914)
