= Sutcliffiella horikoshii =

Scientific classification
- Domain: Bacteria
- Kingdom: Bacillati
- Phylum: Bacillota
- Class: Bacilli
- Order: Bacillales
- Family: Sutcliffiellaceae
- Genus: Sutcliffiella
- Species: S. horikoshii

Binomial name
- Sutcliffiella horikoshii (Nielsen et al. 1995) Gupta et al. 2020

Synonyms
- Bacillus horikoshii Nielsen et al. 1995

Species of bacterium

Sutcliffiella horikoshii is a species of Gram-positive, aerobic, rod-shaped, endospore-forming bacterium. It is alkalitolerant, with optimal growth at approximately pH 8. The specific epithet horikoshii honours Japanese microbiologist Koki Horikoshi. The type strain is PN-121^{T} (= DSM 8719^{T} = ATCC 700161^{T}).

The species was originally described as Bacillus horikoshii in 1995 and was transferred to the genus Sutcliffiella in 2020 on the basis of phylogenomic and comparative genomic analyses.
