= Xanthoparmelia esterhuyseniae =

Scientific classification
- Kingdom: Fungi
- Division: Ascomycota
- Class: Lecanoromycetes
- Order: Lecanorales
- Family: Parmeliaceae
- Genus: Xanthoparmelia
- Species: X. esterhuyseniae

Binomial name
- Xanthoparmelia esterhuyseniae Hale (1986)

Species of lichen

Xanthoparmelia esterhuyseniae is a species of saxicolous (rock-dwelling), foliose lichen in the family Parmeliaceae. Found in Southern Africa, it was formally described as a new species in 1986 by the American lichenologist Mason Hale. The type specimen was collected from the Hex River Mountains at an elevation of 1,500 metres (4,900 ft), where it was found growing on a sandy rock surface on a plateau. The species epithet honors Elsie Elizabeth Esterhuysen, "who has hiked to the tops of so many difficult high peaks in southwestern Cape Province and discovered a number of new species in the Parmeliaceae".

== See also ==
- List of Xanthoparmelia species
