= Sarah Paxon Moore Cooper =

American botanist and botanical collector (1824–1908)

- Born: Sarah Paxon Moore; September 18, 1824; Lancaster County, Pennsylvania, U.S.
- Died: March 13, 1908 (aged 83); Santa Barbara County, California, U.S.
- Other names: Sarah Paxson Moore
- Occupation: Botanist
- Honours: Myriopteris cooperae named for her

Sarah Paxon Moore Cooper (September 18, 1824 – March 13, 1908) was an American botanist and botanical collector, known for her specialization in ferns. She was among the pioneering women in the field of botany during the late 19th century, active primarily in Santa Barbara, California. She was the first female botanist to have an American fern named in her honor, Myriopteris cooperae, or Mrs. Cooper's Lip Fern.

== Early life and marriage ==
Sarah Paxon Moore was born in Lancaster County, Pennsylvania on September 18, 1824, the daughter of Gainer Moore and Mary Cooper Moore. She was raised as an orthodox Quaker. She attended Westtown School near West Chester, Pennsylvania. After graduating school, she married Ellwood Cooper on August 4, 1853, during a Quaker meeting in Philadelphia. Two years later, the couple moved to Port-au-Prince, Haiti, where they spent nearly ten years. In 1865, they moved to Brooklyn, New York. In 1870, they moved to Goleta, California, where she would stay until her death. In California, she was the head of the board of trustees for Santa Barbara College, a boarding primary and secondary school run from 1873 to 1882 before it was converted to the Ellwood Hotel and subsequently demolished in 1914. In connection with the school, she traveled to the east coast in 1873 to recruit a principal, and teachers of Latin, mathematics, and music; her recruits included Charles A. Storke, who became a prominent lawyer and politician in California.

== Botanical work ==
Cooper became a well-known active botanical collector in California in the late 1800s, particularly focusing on ferns. She was one of approximately 1,400 women from the United States and Canada known to have a deep interest in plants before 1900, 99 of whom were based in California. In 1880, she was listed as one of only 140 botanists in California in the Cassino Naturalist's Directory, a national directory of botanists. It was reported that Cooper was "well known by most of the botanists in the United States."

She was a founding member and the first Vice President of the Santa Barbara Society of Natural History. As an initial member of the California Botanical Society in 1891, Cooper worked alongside notable figures such as Katherine Brandegee and H. W. Harkness at the California Academy of Sciences. Her contributions to botany extended beyond her personal collections, as she played a vital role in the development of the state's botanical knowledge. She also worked with Joseph Sexton to collect seeds in California.

Cooper cared for a large home garden at the Cooper Ranch in Santa Barbara which spanned approximately four acres and containing about 1,000 types of plants. Her garden was a "must-see" attraction for visitors to the region. One article states "no other ranch or farm in America" was as well known as Cooper Ranch. She is credited with introducing multiple exotic plants into the Santa Barbara area, including bamboo (Bambusa textilis 'gracilis') from the Himalayas and lychee (then named Nephilium litchi) from China. She is also attributed with bringing one of the first dragon trees to California and possibly the United States.

Cooper co-led the creation of the Santa Barbara Herbarium exhibit at the Chicago World Fair in 1892.

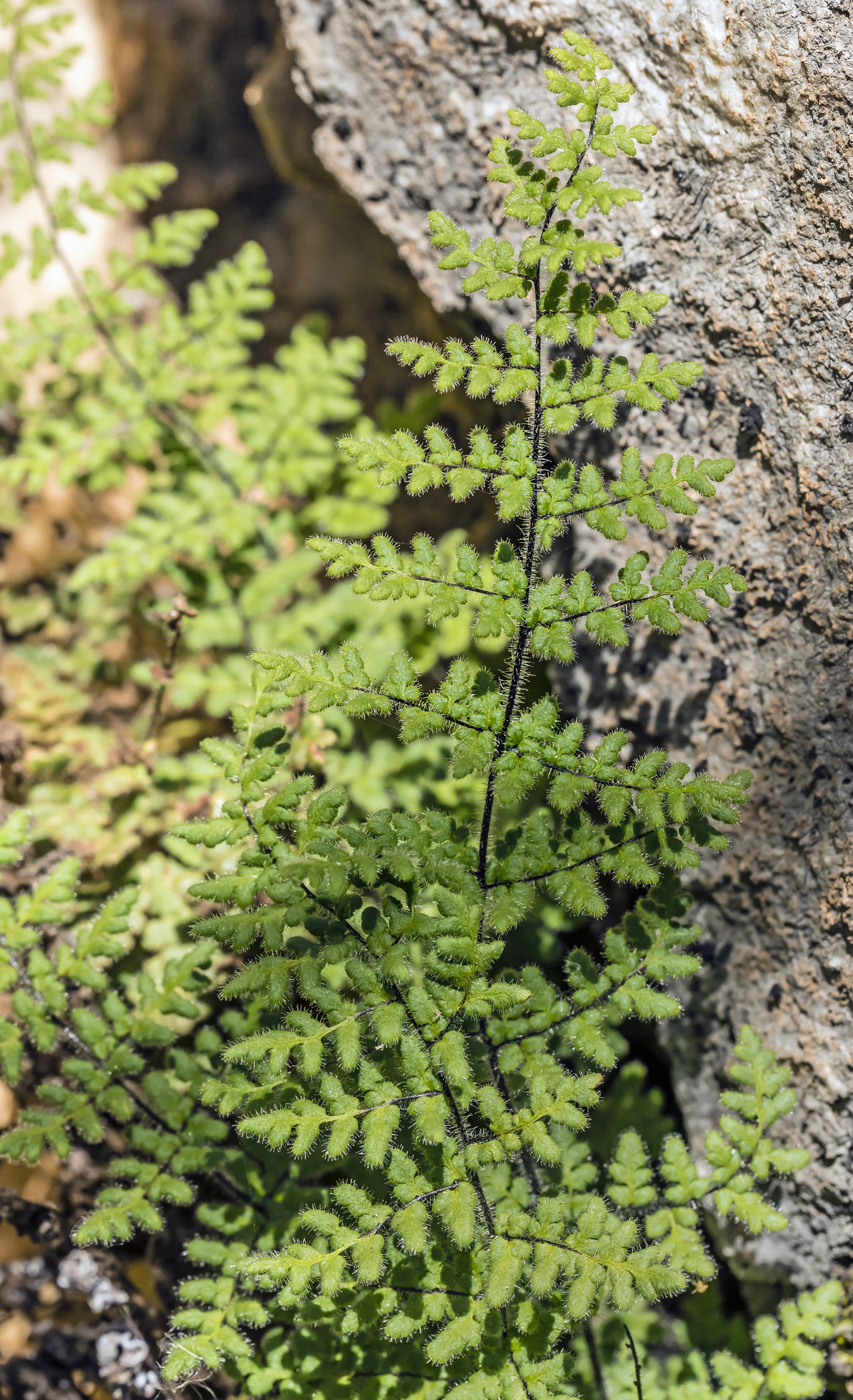
Mrs. Cooper's Lip Fern, Myriopteris cooperae, was named after Cooper in 1875.

== Legacy and contributions ==
Her botanical specimens are still held at multiple institutions, including over 100 specimens at the New York Botanical Garden Steere Herbarium under the name "S. P. Cooper", around 60 specimens at the Harvard University Herbarium from 21 plant families under the name "Mrs. Ellwood Cooper". She was referred to as a "noted pioneer" by the Santa Barbara Historical Society for her contributions to the region's botanical history.

The fern Myriopteris cooperae, or Mrs. Cooper's Lip Fern, is named after Cooper by D. C. Eaton, described in 1875. According to Eaton, this was the first American fern named for a female botanist. Eaton named many other plants after her.

== Personal life and death ==
Sarah Paxon Moore Cooper and her husband, Ellwood Cooper, had three children: Henry, Ellen, and Fannie. She died on March 13, 1908.
