= Harem effect (science) =

In the sociology and history of science, the harem effect refers to a phenomenon whereby a male scientist, in a position of power, predominantly hires female subordinates for his research team.

Positively, the "Harem Effect" provided female scientists with exceptional possibilities to pursue careers in their preferred professions. Additionally, it made a lot of scientific endeavours attainable from an economic standpoint. These ladies were the human computers of a period before computers.

The downside was that female scientists were frequently refused acknowledgement for their findings and hindered by "busy work," sometimes known as "women's labour." The women at the "harem" received compensation less compared to their male colleagues, yet put in more hours than males despite the fact that this "women's profession" usually required accurate assessments, difficult mathematical calculations, and large amounts of data processing. Most importantly, it is sometimes forgotten that these female scientists' "women's labour" during the Victorian era led to remarkable advancements in a variety of subjects.

== History ==
While there are numerous historical examples of this phenomenon and the practice may continue today, two examples stand out in the literature. Erwin Frink Smith, a USDA plant pathologist in the Bureau of Plant Industry, hired more than twenty female assistants at the agency to study various agricultural problems in the late 19th and early 20th century. Edward Charles Pickering, astrophysicist and director of the Harvard College Observatory, assembled what became known as “Pickering's Harem”—an all-female staff of a dozen or more to assist in his research program to gather and analyze stellar spectra.

Possible reasons suggested for this effect include the significantly lower pay required (allowing many more assistants to be hired) and reduced competition from a "bevy of female subordinates, competent but less threatening than an equal number of bright young men." In Smith's case, a further factor may have been USDA's structural exclusion of women from taking the examinations that would have allowed them to enter the higher-ranking jobs for which they were qualified.
