= Erwin Frink Smith =

American plant pathologist

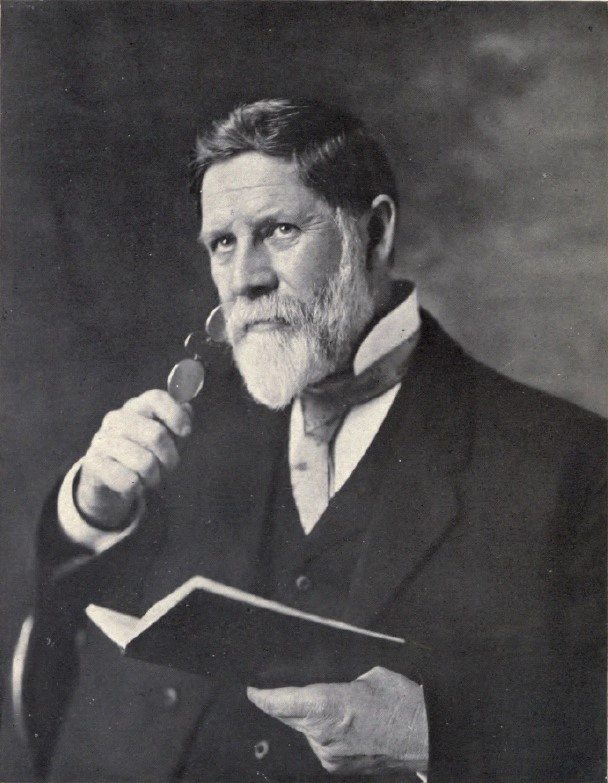
- Born: January 21, 1854; Oswego County, New York
- Died: April 6, 1927 (aged 73); Washington, D.C.
- Education: University of Michigan
- Awards: National Academy of Sciences (1913); American Academy of Arts and Sciences (1914)
- Scientific career
- Fields: Botany, plant pathology, cancer research
- Workplaces: United States Department of Agriculture

Erwin Frink Smith (January 21, 1854 – April 6, 1927) was an American plant pathologist with the United States Department of Agriculture. He played a major role in demonstrating that bacteria could cause plant disease.

== Early life and educations ==
Smith was born in Gilbert Mills, near Fulton, New York, to Rancellor King Smith and Louisa Frink Smith. In 1870 he moved with his family to an 80-acre farm, which eventually included an apple orchard, in Clinton County, Michigan. The Smith family eventually moved to North Plains Township, Michigan. Smith was finally able to attend Ionia High School, starting in 1876, when he was 22 years old.

Smith was largely self-taught in botany, bacteriology, and languages, reading widely in French, German and Italian. In 1881, while still in high school, he co-authored a book on the flora of Michigan titled Cataloque of the Phaenogamous and Vascular Cryptogamous Plants of Michigan with Charles F. Wheeler. Charles Fay Wheeler (1842–1910) was a pharmacist and amateur botanist in Ionia, Michigan. He tutored Smith in botany and French when Smith was in high school.

Smith was next employed by the State Board of Health of Lansing, Michigan, while also studying intermittently at Michigan Agricultural College. In 1885 Smith published a book on water sanitation. Smith was accepted to the University of Michigan in 1885 and passed examinations for most of the coursework soon after acceptance, which allowed him to earn his bachelor's degree in biology in 1886 after only one year at the university. He earned his doctorate from Michigan in 1889 for his work on peach yellows.

== Career ==
On September 20, 1886, Smith took a position in the Mycological Section of the Division of Botany of the US Department of Agriculture, assisting Frank Lamson-Scribner. He mapped the occurrence of potato rot in the United States for 1885, and of Plasmopara viticola for 1886, but spent most of his early career (1887–1892) studying the plant diseases peach yellows (1886–1892) and peach rosette (1888–1891).

In 1892, Smith began working on bacterial diseases in plants, starting with bacterial wilt in gourds (Cucurbitaceae). Throughout his career, Smith pursued the hypothesis that bacteria were significant causes of plant disease, painstaking describing more than 100 bacterial diseases of plants. Resistance to the idea of a bacterial basis, which Smith debated with German scientist Alfred Fischer in the 1890s, eventually gave way. Smith published his exhaustive work Bacteria in Relation to Plant Diseases in three volumes in 1905, 1911, and 1914. Further work was published in his textbook Bacterial Diseases of Plants (1920).

Smith became particularly interested in crown gall, a bacterial disease that causes tumor-like growths in a wide variety of plants. In 1912, he published research comparing crown gall with human cancer, highlighting similarities between plant and animal tumors and raising questions about the possible role of infectious agents in cancer. This work led to a longstanding interest in cancer research, and he served as president of the American Association for Cancer Research from 1924 to 1925. At the AACR's 1925 annual meeting, he delivered the presidential address, titled "Some Newer Aspects of Cancer Research," in which he reviewed contemporary developments in cancer research and discussed their implications for understanding and treating the disease. He also elaborated on his hypothesis that cancer originated from parasites, arguing that substances produced by these organisms disrupted metabolism and promoted abnormal cell growth. In discussing this theory, he drew on various contemporary lines of research, including Otto Warburg's experiments on the respiration of cancer cells, which he considered supportive of his hypothesis.

Smith was elected to the United States National Academy of Sciences in 1913, the American Academy of Arts and Sciences in 1914, and the American Philosophical Society in 1916.

Dutch American botanical explorer Frank Nicholas Meyer worked for Smith in 1901, upon his arrival in the United States.

At a time when it was unusual to do so, Smith was known for hiring many women at the Bureau of Plant industry, including botanists Nellie A. Brown, Mary K. Bryan, Florence Hedges, Lucia McCulloch, Agnes J. Quirk, Angie Beckwith, and Charlotte Elliott. Historian Margaret W. Rossiter cites this as an example of a harem effect. In Smith's case, a factor in hiring women only as assistants may have been USDA's structural exclusion of women from taking the examinations that would have allowed them to enter the higher-ranking jobs for which they were qualified. Many of Smith's assistants praised him for giving them research projects suited to their skills rather than confining them to the more limited tasks presumed by their job classifications.

The genus Erwinia is named in Smith's honor.

== Personal life and death ==
Erwin Smith married Charlotte May Buffett on April 13, 1893. Their marriage was a happy one, but was ended by Charlotte's death on December 28, 1906, eight months after she was diagnosed with endocarditis. Smith celebrated her memory in an elegantly produced book of poetry and biography entitled For Her Friends and Mine: A Book of Aspirations, Dreams and Memories (1915).

Smith died on April 6, 1927, in Washington, D.C. His ashes were scattered at Woods Hole, Massachusetts. He was survived by his second wife, Ruth Warren Smith.
