= Citrus canker =

Bacterial fruit disease

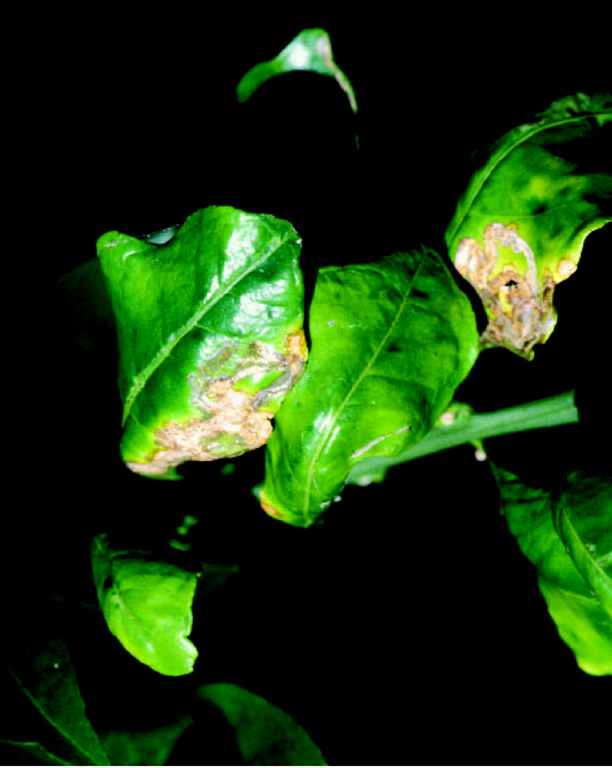
- Lesions on leaves
- Common names: bacterial spot of citrus
- Causal agents: Xanthomonas citri pv. citri and pv. aurantifolii
- Hosts: citrus trees, including lime, oranges and grapefruit
- EPPO Code: XANTCI
- Distribution: Brazil and the United States

Citrus canker is a disease affecting Citrus species caused by the bacterium Xanthomonas citri. Infection causes lesions on the leaves, stems, and fruit of citrus trees, including lime, oranges, and grapefruit. While not harmful to humans, canker significantly affects the vitality of citrus trees, causing leaves and fruit to drop prematurely; a fruit infected with canker is safe to eat, but too unsightly to be sold. Citrus canker is mainly a leaf-spotting and rind-blemishing disease, but when conditions are highly favorable, it can cause defoliation, shoot dieback, and fruit drop.

The disease, which is believed to have originated in Southeast Asia, is extremely persistent when it becomes established in an area. Citrus groves have been destroyed in attempts to eradicate the disease.

Countries like Brazil and the United States also suffer from canker outbreaks.

== Biology ==
Xanthomonas citri is a rod-shaped Gram-negative bacterium with polar flagella. The bacterium has a genome length around 5 megabase pairs. A number of types of citrus canker diseases are caused by different pathovars and variants of the bacterium:

- The Asiatic type of canker (canker A), X. citri pv. citri, caused by a group of strains originally found in Asia, is the most widespread and severe form of the disease.
  - A* strains, discovered in Oman, Saudi Arabia, Iran, and India, only infect key lime.
- Cancrosis B, caused by a group of X. citri pv. aurantifolii strains originally found in South America is a disease of lemons, key lime, bitter orange, and pomelo.
- Cancrosis C, also caused by strains within X. citri pv. aurantifolii, only infects key lime and bitter orange.

=== Taxonomy ===
The pathovars citri and aurantfolii were originally classified in X. campestris (1960–1992), then in X. axonopodis (1995), then finally as its own species X. citri since 2016. Moreover, there is a taxonomic argument that X. citri is a later heterotypic synonym of X. cissicola. As a result, sources may use any of the four species names. The classification as its own distinct species X. citri is supported by whole-genomic data.

== Pathology ==
Plants infected with citrus canker have characteristic lesions on leaves, stems, and fruit with raised, brown, water-soaked margins, usually with a yellow halo or ring effect around the lesion. Older lesions have a corky appearance, still in many cases retaining the halo effect. The bacterium propagates in lesions in leaves, stems, and fruit. The lesions ooze bacterial cells that, when dispersed by windblown rain, can spread to other plants in the area. Infection may spread further by hurricanes. The disease can also be spread by contaminated equipment, and by transport of infected or apparently healthy plants. Due to latency of the disease, a plant may appear to be healthy, but actually be infected.

Citrus canker bacteria can enter through a plant's stomata or through wounds on leaves or other green parts. In most cases, younger leaves are considered to be the most susceptible. Also, damage caused by citrus leaf miner larvae (Phyllocnistis citrella) can be sites for infection to occur. Within a controlled laboratory setting, symptoms can appear in 14 days following inoculation into a susceptible host. In the field environment, the time for symptoms to appear and be clearly discernible from other foliar diseases varies; it may be on the order of several months after infection. Lower temperatures increase the latency of the disease. Citrus canker bacteria can stay viable in old lesions and other plant surfaces for several months.

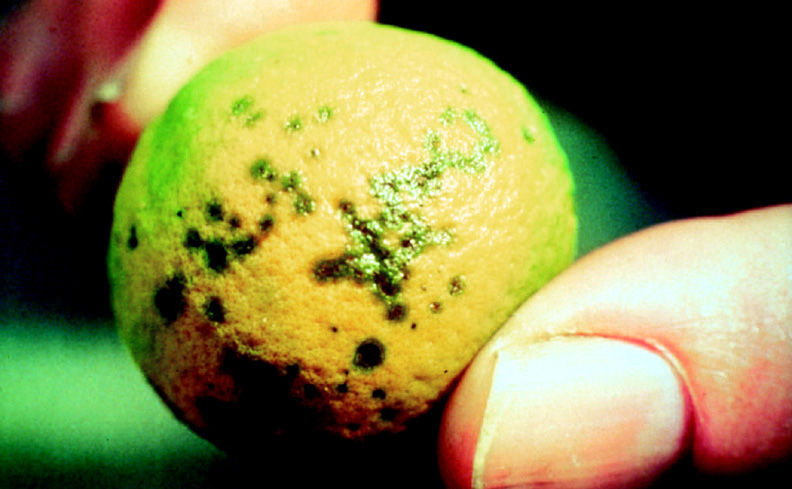
Citrus canker lesions on fruit

== Pathogenicity ==
Xanthomonas citri has the capability to form a biofilm for attachment on the host. The biofilm is the result of the production of extracellular polysaccharides (xanthan). The biofilm ensures the virulence and epiphytic survival of X. citri pv. citri prior to the development of citrus canker. In addition, the bacteria secrete transcriptional activator-like (TAL) effectors through the type III secretion system. The effector interacts with host machinery to induce transcription for genes that regulate plant hormones such as gibberellin and auxin.

== Disease cycle ==
Xanthomonas citri pv. citri overseason in an infected area which appears as a canker lesion on leaf or stem. Canker lesions start out as pinpoint spots 2 to 10 millimeters in diameter. The bacteria ooze out of the lesions when there is free moisture. During rainy weather, wind-blown rain carries the inoculum to new susceptible hosts. The bacteria infect new plants through stomata and wounds. Pruning or hedging can cut open mesophyll tissues, creating wounds through which the plant may be directly infected. The rain can also cause water congestion on the leaf surface, form columns of water through the stomata and promote infection through natural openings. Infections can form on fruit, foliage and young stem. Leaves and stems are most susceptible to infection within the first six weeks of initial growth. Infection of fruit is most likely to occur during the 90 day period after petal fall during fruit formation. The varied size of lesions on citrus fruit is because of the multiple cycle of infections and can reflect different-aged lesions on the same fruit.

=== Favorable environmental conditions ===
Wind-driven rain plays a major role in the dispersal of X. citri. The bacteria are said to be readily dispersed by splashed rain and wind and the quantity of X. citri declines after the first event of wind-blown rain dispersal. Apart from that, the bacteria also favor warm weather. The cases of citrus canker are more acute in areas that receive high rainfall and have high mean temperature, such as Florida. Often, cankers emerge briskly during fall, slowly during winter and most rapidly in mid to late spring.

=== Detection ===
The disease can be detected in groves and on fruit by the appearance of lesions. Early detection is critical in quarantine situations. Bacteria can be tested for pathogenicity by inoculating multiple citrus species with them. Additional diagnostic tests (antibody detection), fatty-acid profiling, and genetic procedures using polymerase chain reaction can be conducted to confirm diagnosis and may help to identify the particular canker strain. Clara H. Hasse determined that citrus canker was not of fungoid origin but was caused by a bacterial parasite. Her research published in the 1915 Journal of Agricultural Research played a major part in saving citrus crops in multiple states.

=== Susceptibility ===
Not all species and varieties of citrus have been tested for citrus canker. Most of the common species and varieties of citrus are susceptible to it. Some species are more susceptible than others, while a few species are resistant to infection.

Susceptibility	Variety
Highly susceptible	Grapefruit (Citrus x paradisi), Key lime (C. aurantiifolia), Kaffir lime (C. hystrix), lemon (C. limon)
Susceptible	Limes (C. latifolia) including Tahiti lime, Palestine sweet lime; trifoliate orange (Poncirus trifoliata); citranges/citrumelos (P. trifoliata hybrids); tangerines, tangors, tangelos (C. reticulata hybrids); sweet oranges (C. sinensis); bitter oranges (C. aurantium)
Resistant	Citron (C. medica), Mandarins (C. reticulata)
Highly resistant	Calamondin (X Citrofortunella), kumquat (Fortunella spp.)
Modified from: Gottwald, T.R. et al. (2002). Citrus canker: The pathogen and its impact. Online. Plant Health Progress

== Management ==
Quarantine measures are implemented in areas where citrus canker is not endemic or has been obliterated to prevent the introduction of X. citri. On the other hand, in regions where citrus canker occurs, Integrated Pest Management (IPM) is utilized. The most notable feature of this management program is the transposition of susceptible citrus plants to field resistant citrus cultivars. Apart from using resistant cultivars in fields, there are several measures that are taken to control citrus canker from causing failed crop. The measures can be divided into three major categories: exclusion, eradication and sanitation.

=== Exclusion ===
Citrus trees or fruits from outside of the country are inspected to ensure they are bacteria-free trees. Under the management program, the production of Xac (X. axonopodis pv. citri, an old name for X. citri pv. citri)-free nursery trees for exclusion of canker from orchard is also mandatory. Because the bacteria can be introduced from countries with endemic canker or canker outbreaks, strict restrictions on citrus importation are implemented in citrus-growing countries. Citrus trees will only be grown on canker-free fields at least one year after effective eradication. Planting sites are also chosen to minimize favorable environmental conditions for the spread of X. citri. For example, areas with strong wind are avoided to decrease the dispersal of bacterial inoculum to the susceptible citrus trees.

=== Eradication ===
Once citrus canker is introduced into a field, removal of the infected trees is enacted to halt further spread of the bacteria. For instance, in Florida between 2000 and 2006, all citrus trees within 1,900 feet (580 m) of infected trees were required to be eradicated. In the process, the infected trees are uprooted and burned, as the bacteria can survive on the lesions of woody branches for years. In urban areas, the trees are cut down and chipped, then disposed of in landfills.

=== Sanitation ===
X. citri pv. citri can be transmitted by mechanical means such as humans and machinery. As a sanitation measure, the workers in citrus orchards are required to do thorough decontamination of personnel and equipment to prevent the spread of bacteria from the infected areas. Aerosol inoculum is able to cause infection in wetted foliage in the zone of bacterial dispersal. Vehicles can also become contaminated by contacting the wet foliage. Contaminated equipment and machines can be disinfected by spraying bactericide.

== Distribution and economic impact ==
Citrus canker is thought to have originated in the area of Southeast Asia-India. It is now also present in Japan, South and Central Africa, the Middle East, Bangladesh, the Pacific Islands, some countries in South America, and Florida. Some areas of the world have eradicated citrus canker and others have ongoing eradication programs, but the disease remains endemic in most areas where it has appeared. Because of its rapid spread, high potential for damage, and impact on export sales and domestic trade, citrus canker is a significant threat to all citrus-growing regions.

=== Australia ===
The citrus industry is the largest fresh-fruit exporting industry in Australia. Australia has had four outbreaks of citrus canker, all of which have been successfully eradicated. The disease was found twice during the 1900s in the Northern Territory and was eradicated each time. In 2004, an unexplained outbreak occurred in central Queensland. The state and federal governments ordered all commercial groves, all non-commercial citrus trees, and all native lime trees (C. glauca) in the vicinity of Emerald to be destroyed rather than trying to isolate infected trees. Eradication was successful, with permission to replant being granted to farmers by the biosecurity unit of the Queensland Department of Primary Industries in early 2009.

Citrus canker was detected again in April 2018 and confirmed in May 2018 in the Northern Territory and Western Australia.

=== Brazil ===
Citrus is an important domestic and export crop for Brazil. Citrus agriculture is the second-most important agricultural activity in the state of São Paulo, the largest sweet orange production area in the world. Over 100,000 groves are in São Paulo, and the area planted with citrus is increasing. Of the estimated 2 million trees, greater than 80% are a single variety of orange, and the remainder is made up of tangerine and lemon trees. Because of the uniformity in citrus variety, the state has been adversely affected by canker, causing crop and monetary losses. In Brazil, rather than destroying entire groves to eradicate the disease, contaminated trees and trees within a 30-m radius are destroyed; by 1998, over half a million trees had been destroyed.

=== United States ===
Citrus canker was first found in the United States in 1910 not far from the Georgia – Florida border. Subsequently, canker was discovered in 1912 in Dade County, more than 400 mi (600 km) away. Beyond Florida, the disease was discovered in the Gulf states and reached as far north as South Carolina. It took more than 20 years to eradicate that outbreak of citrus canker, from 1913 through 1931, $2.5 million in state and private funds were spent to control it—a sum equivalent to $28 million in 2000 dollars. In 26 counties, some 257,745 grove trees and 3,093,110 nursery trees were destroyed by burning. Citrus canker was detected again on the Gulf Coast of Florida in 1986 and declared eradicated in 1994.

The most recent outbreak of citrus canker was discovered in Miami-Dade County, Florida, on September 28, 1995, by Louis Willio Francillon, a Florida Department of Agriculture agronomist. Despite eradication attempts, by late 2005, the disease had been detected in many places distant from the original discovery, for example, in Orange Park, 315 miles (500 km) away. In January 2000, the Florida Department of Agriculture adopted a policy of removing all infected trees and all citrus trees within a 1900-ft radius of an infected tree in both residential areas and commercial groves. Previous to this eradication policy, the department eradicated all citrus trees within 125 ft of an infected one. The program ended in January 2006 following a statement from the USDA that eradication was not feasible.

== See also ==
- Bacterial blight of cassava
- Clara H. Hasse
