= Florence Hedges =

American plant pathologist and botanist

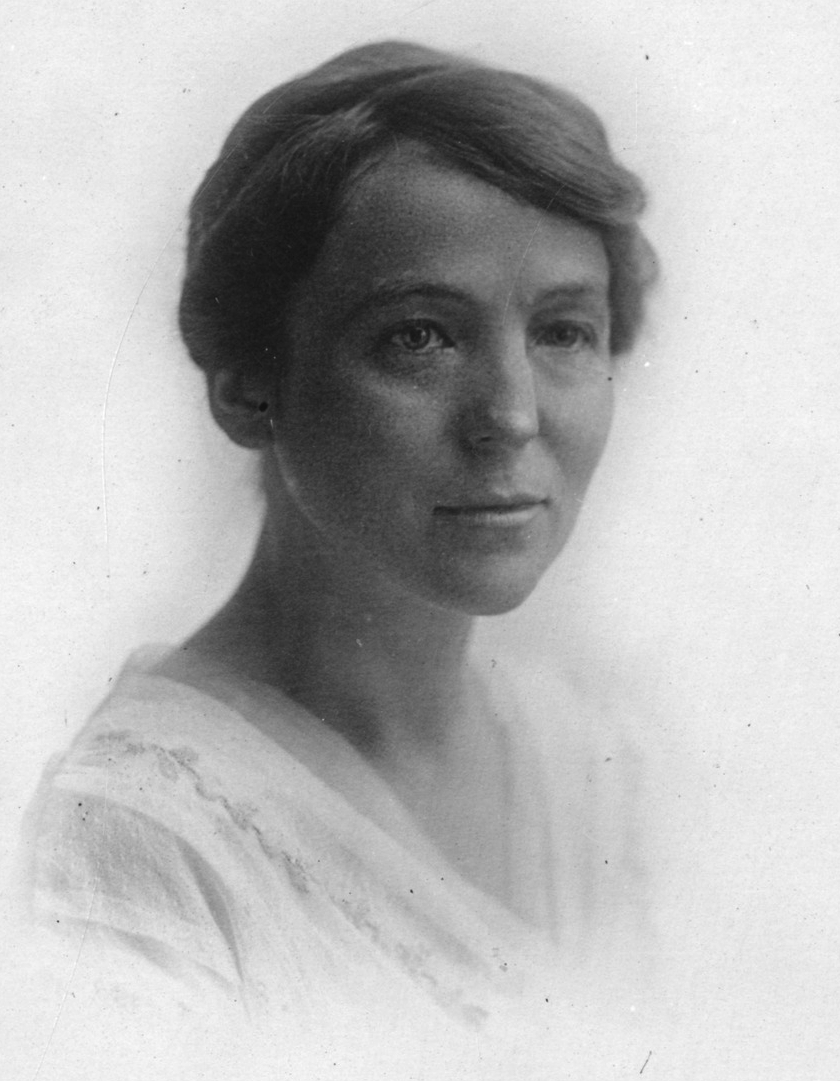
- Hedges in 1915
- Born: August 24, 1878; Lansing, Michigan
- Died: December 17, 1956 (aged 78); San Francisco, California
- Education: University of Michigan
- Known for: Botany, Plant pathology
- Scientific career
- Workplaces: United States Department of Agriculture

Florence Hedges (August 24, 1878 – December 17, 1956) was a pioneering American plant pathologist and botanist with the United States Department of Agriculture's Bureau of Plant Industry.

== Life and career ==
Hedges was born in Lansing, Michigan. She graduated from University of Michigan in 1901. Much of her work involved investigations into bacteria-induced plant disease. Charlotte Elliot, Hellie A. Brown, Edith Cash, Mary Katharine Bryan, Anna Jenkins, and Lucia McCulloch, Pearle Smith, and Angie Beckwith were among the people she worked with while a researcher at the USDA.

With Erwin Frink Smith, she also translated the 1896 biography of Louis Pasteur by Émile Duclaux.

She died in San Francisco, California.
