= Pamela Woods =

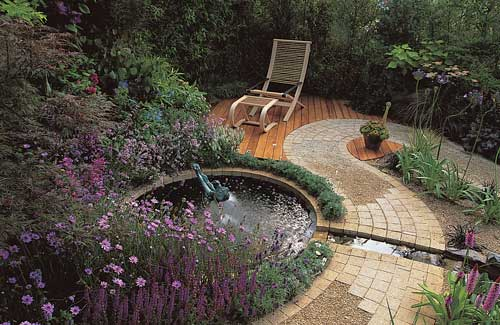
Feng Shui Garden (Hampton Court Palace Flower Show 1999)

Pamela Woods was born 1952 to Hilda and Herbert Woods in Leigh, Greater Manchester. She later moved to Berkshire in the early 1960s.

After gaining a degree in Botany at the University of Nottingham, she began a career in landscape design eventually establishing a specialist design consultancy, Sacred Gardens, in 1998.

In 1999 Sacred Gardens won the Silver Gilt medal for The feng shui garden at the Hampton Court Palace Flower Show. Through Sacred Gardens, Pamela went on to create the Shinto Garden for the Queen's Royal Jubilee.

In 2002 her book Gardens for the Soul was published by Conran Octopus and Rizzoli, for which photographer John Glover winning the Garden Photography of the Year award.

Pamela lives with her husband James Showers in Gloucestershire by the River Severn. She has two children, Sarah Davis-Berry and Sam Plews.
