= Agnes J. Quirk =

American botanist (1884-1974)

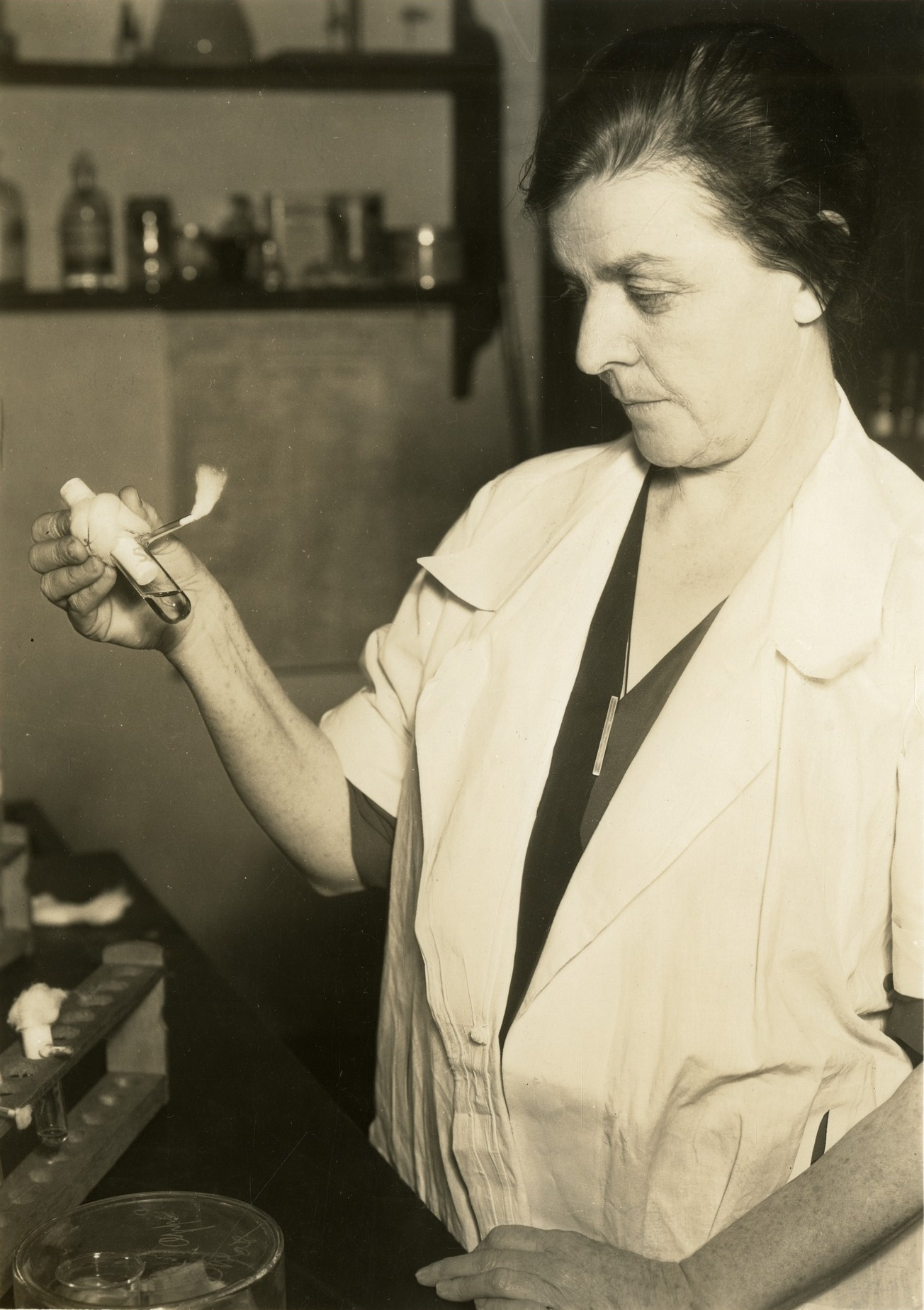
- Quirk in 1932
- Born: 1884
- Died: 1974 (aged 89–90)
- Occupations: bacteriologist, plant pathologist, inventor

Agnes J. Quirk (1884–1974) was an American bacteriologist, plant pathologist, and inventor. She oversaw the culturing of bacteria in the Laboratory of Plant Pathology at the United States Department of Agriculture's Bureau of Plant Industry. She received a patent for the production of penicillin mold and jelly in 1952.

== Life and career ==
Hired by B.T. Galloway, who headed the Laboratory of Plant Pathology at the USDA's Bureau of Plant Industry. There, in 1901, she became an assistant to pathologist-in-charge Erwin Frink Smith, who was "proud of his record of appointing women to work at the department."

Quirk's research focused on crown gall oxidation phenomena and culture mediums used in pathogenic analyses, working alongside Nellie A. Brown. Her original job titles at the laboratory consisted of "laboratory aide" and "scientific assistant". While a lab assistant, Quirk had three of her own assistants who helped her prepare growth media. She also invented a new apparatus to help measure amounts of media more accurately and without funnels.

In 1923, she worked with Edna H. Fawcett to publish a paper concerning the hydrogen-ion concentration in culture mediums. Their joint research considered "the approximate ranges of growth (acid-alkaline) of more than 24 bacteria pathogenic to plants."

From 1928 to 1948, Quirk was the head of the laboratory. At the Symposium on Bacterial Dissociation and Life Cycles of the Society of American Bacteriologists, Quirk presented "A Five-fold Technic for Producing the Filterable Form of Bacillus phytophthorus," showcasing her skills in bacteriology. As a bacteriologist with experience, Quirk would share out different culturing techniques, like a formula for potato agar and a novel growth medium.

Research materials from Quirk's career are preserved in the Smithsonian Institution Archives, offering insight into her work in plant pathology.

In addition to her scientific achievements, Quirk spent her time in Washington, DC actively participating in the women's suffrage movement.

== Selected publications ==
- Quirk, A.J. & Fawcett, E. H. (1923). Hydrogen-ion concentration vs. titratable acidity in culture mediums.
- Quirk, A.J. & Smith, E.F. (1926). A Begonia Immune to Crowngall: With Observations on other Immune or Semi-Immune Plants
- Brown, N. A., & Quirk, A. J. (1929). Influence of bacteriophage on Bacterium tumefaciens, and some potential studies of filtrates.
- Quirk, A.J. (1931). Pure Smooth and Rough Colony Types at Will: Science Vol. 74 Friday, November 6, 1931, No. 1923
- Quirk, A.J. (1934). The Correlation of Animal and Plant Bacterial Behavior and Imposed Culture Aledium Environment. Journal of Bacteriology 1934 (J. Bacteriol. 1934, 27(1):22.)
