= Sutcliffiella =

Scientific classification
- Domain: Bacteria
- Kingdom: Bacillati
- Phylum: Bacillota
- Class: Bacilli
- Order: Bacillales
- Family: Sutcliffiellaceae
- Genus: Sutcliffiella; Gupta et al. 2020

Type species
- Sutcliffiella cohnii (Spanka & Fritze 1993) Gupta et al. 2020

Species
- S. catenulata; S. cohnii; S. deserti; S. halmapala; S. horikoshii; S. rhizosphaerae; S. tianshenii; S. zhanjiangensis

Genus of bacteria

Sutcliffiella is a genus of Gram-Positive rod-shaped bacteria in the family Bacillaceae from the order Bacillales. The type species of this genus is Sutcliffiella cohnii.

Members of Sutcliffiella are previously species belonging to Bacillus, a genus that has been recognized as displaying extensive polyphyly and phylogenetic heterogeneity due to the vague criteria (such as the ability to form endospores in the presence of oxygen) previously used to assign species to this clade. Multiple studies using comparative phylogenetic analyses have been published in an attempt to clarify the evolutionary relationships between Bacillus species, resulting in the establishment of numerous novel genera such as Alkalihalobacillus, Brevibacillus, Solibacillus, Alicyclobacillus, Virgibacillus and Evansella. In addition, the genus Bacillus has been restricted to only include species closely related to Bacillus subtilis and Bacillus cereus.

The name Sutcliffiella was named after the British microbiologist Professor Iain Sutcliffe (University of Northumbria, Newcastle upon Tyne) for his work on microbial cell envelope and lipoproteins and his contributions towards advancement of the discipline of Microbial taxonomy as long-serving editor of the journal Antonie van Leeuwenhoek.

== Biochemical characteristics and molecular signatures ==
Members of this genus are aerobic or facultatively anaerobic and found in soil. All members can produce endospores and some are motile. Sutcliffiella can grow in temperatures ranging from 10 °C to 40 °C but the optimal growth temperature is in the range of 30-37 °C.

Nine conserved signature indels (CSIs) were identified through genomic analyses for this genus in the following proteins: transcription antiterminator, DUF1273 domain-containing protein, ribosome maturation factor RimM, DNA replication/repair protein RecF, type I DNA topoisomerase, hypothetical proteins and DNA polymerase III subunit alpha, which in most cases are exclusively shared by either all or most members of this genus. These CSIs provide a reliable method of identification and differentiation for Sutcliffiella species from other Bacillaceae genera and bacteria in molecular terms.

== Taxonomy ==
Sutcliffiella, as of May 2021, contains a total of 5 species with validly published names. This genus was identified as a monophyletic clade and phylogenetically unrelated to other Bacillus species in studies examining the taxonomic relationships within Bacillus. This branching pattern is also observed in the Genome Taxonomy Database (GTDB).

Two non-validly published species, "Bacillus aequorois" and "Bacillus catenulatus", are also found to group with other members of Sutcliffiella in phylogenetic trees as well as share the same molecular markers in the form of conserved signature indels (CSIs). However, their transfer was not officially proposed due to the lack of culture strain information. Further revision of this genus is required as additional genomes and novel species are discovered and assigned.

=== Phylogeny ===
16S rRNA based LTP_10_2024

- Sutcliffiella
  - - S. zhanjiangensis (Chen et al. 2012) Gupta et al. 2020
    - - S. catenulata (Sultanpuram et al. 2018) Gupta et al. 2020
      - S. cohnii (Spanka & Fritze 1993) Gupta et al. 2020
  - - S. rhizosphaerae Kämpfer et al. 2022
    - - S. horikoshii (Nielsen, Fritze & Priest 1995) Gupta et al. 2020
      - - S. deserti Bai et al. 2022
        - - S. halmapala (Nielsen, Fritze & Priest 1995) Gupta et al. 2020
          - S. tianshenii (Jiang et al. 2014) Li et al. 2024

120 marker proteins based GTDB 09-RS220

- Sutcliffiella
  - - Bacillus alkalisoli Liu et al. 2019
    - S. cohnii
  - - - S. horikoshii
      - S. rhizosphaerae
    - - S. tianshenii
      - - S. deserti
        - S. halmapala
