= Otto Warburg =

Otto Warburg may refer to:

- Otto Warburg (botanist) (1859–1938), German botanist
- Otto Heinrich Warburg (1883–1970), German physiologist
