= Winifred Mary Page =

British botanist and mycologist (1887–1965)

- Born: 11 November 1887
- Died: 9 March 1965 (aged 77)
- Occupations: botanist, taxonomist, and mycologist

Winifred Mary Page (11 November 1887 – 9 March 1965) was a British botanist, taxonomist, and mycologist known for her research on fungi and lichens, which was published in the Transactions of the British Mycological Society. In 1951 she was elected to the Linnean Society of London when she had reached her early 60s.

== Life ==
Winifred Mary Page was born on 11 November 1887. She was a botanist, taxonomist, and mycologist known for her research on fungi and lichens which as published in the Transactions of the British Mycological Society. In 1951 she was elected to the Linnean Society of London when she had reached her early 60's.

Page died on 9 March 1965.

The standard author abbreviation W.M.Page is used to indicate this person as the author when citing a botanical name.
