= Clara H. Hasse =

American botanist

Clara Henriette Hasse
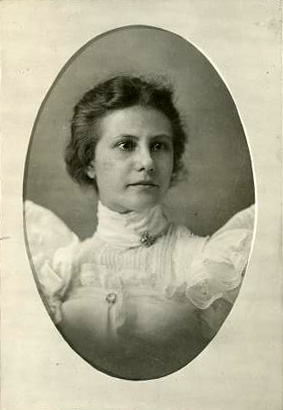
- Born: 1880
- Died: 10 October 1926 (aged 45–46); Muskegon, Michigan
- Education: University of Michigan
- Known for: Identified the cause of citrus canker
- Scientific career
- Fields: Botanist focused on plant pathology
- Workplaces: Bureau of Plant Industry, U.S. Department of Agriculture; Florida Agricultural Experiment Station
- Author abbrev. (botany): C.H.Hasse

Clara Henriette Hasse (1880 – 10 October 1926) was an American botanist whose research focused on plant pathology. She is known for identifying the cause of citrus canker, which was threatening crops in the Deep South.

== Biography ==
Hasse attended the University of Michigan. While at U of M, she was appointed an assistant in botany in 1902. Hasse was a founding member of the Women's Research Club at U of M as women were not allowed in the Research Club at the time. After graduating from the University of Michigan in 1903 with a PhB, she went to Washington, D.C., to take up an appointment as assistant horticulturist and botanist in the Bureau of Plant Industry at the U.S. Department of Agriculture under Erwin Frink Smith, the USDA's pathologist-in-charge. Hasse was one of the twenty assistants that Smith hired during his tenure at the USDA. She later worked at the Florida Agricultural Experiment Station. Hasse died at her home in Muskegon, Michigan, aged 46.

== Research ==
Her paper "Pseudomonas citri, the cause of Citrus canker", published in the Journal of Agricultural Research in 1915, was the first to identify the cause of citrus canker. While originally it was believed that citrus canker was of fungoid origin, Hasse found that bacteria are at its source. Hasse isolated the bacteria, now known as Xanthomonas axonopodis pv. citri. Her work was included in Department of Agriculture bulletins to index the diseases of economic plants.

Thomas Swann Harding credits this research with resulting "in control methods which prevented this disease from wiping out the citrus crop in Florida, Alabama, Mississippi, and Texas."

== Partial bibliography ==
- "Pseudomonas citri, the cause of Citrus canker", Journal of Agricultural Research, vol. IV, no. 1, April 15, 1915, pp. 97-100
