= Elsie Elizabeth Esterhuysen =

South African botanist

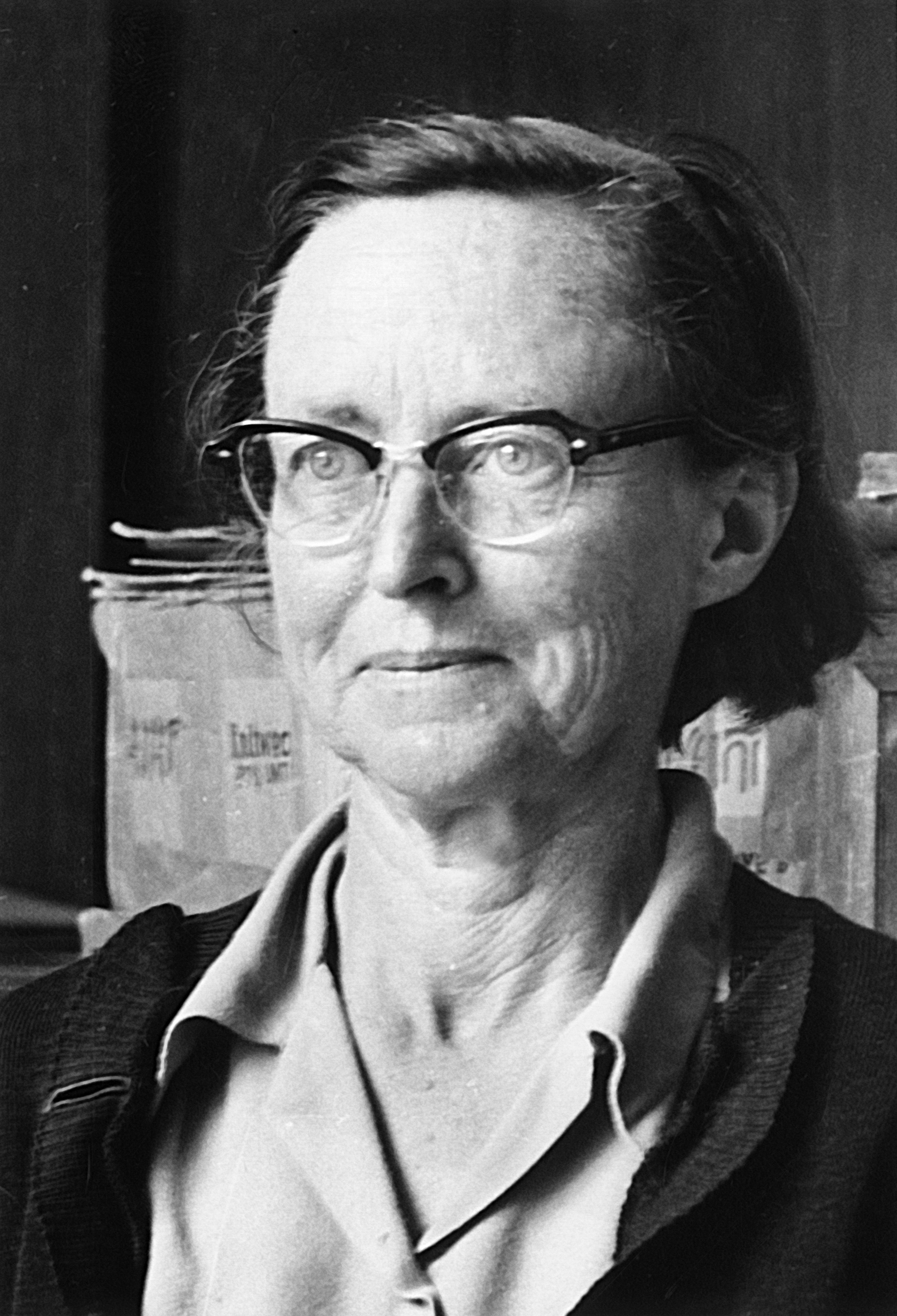
Elsie Elizabeth Esterhuysen (1912–2006)

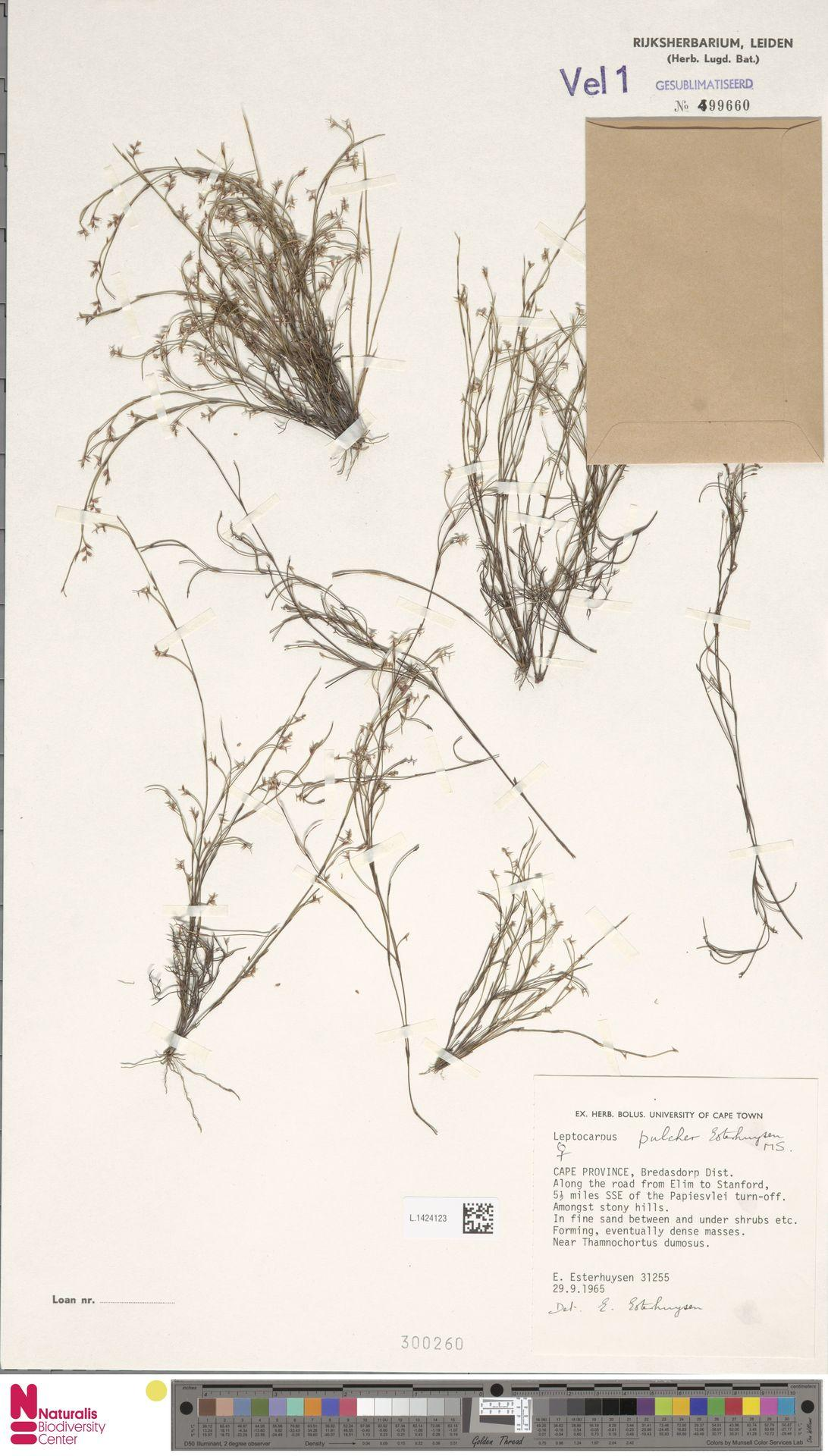
Naturalis Biodiversity Center - L.1424123 - Calopsis pulchra Esterhuysen, collected and described by E. E. Esterhuysen

Elsie Elizabeth Esterhuysen (11 April 1912 – 1 January 2006) was a South African botanist. She was described as "the most outstanding collector ever of South African flora", amassing 36,000 herbarium specimens.

== Early life and education ==
Elsie Elizabeth Esterhuysen was born in Observatory, Cape Town, the daughter of Johannes Petrus Leroux Esterhuysen and Florence Ethel Larken. Her father spoke Afrikaans as well as English; her mother only spoke English. Her father and brother were lawyers. She attended Wynberg Girls High School and the University of Cape Town. She earned her master's degree in botany in 1933, and did further field work on a scholarship at Kirstenbosch.

== Career ==
In 1936, she started working as an assistant to Maria Wilman at the McGregor Museum in Kimberley. She worked at the Bolus Herbarium, the oldest functioning herbarium in South Africa established in 1856, beginning in 1938. Her job was informal until 1956, when a permanent post was created for her through the University of Cape Town. She concentrated on collecting from the high altitude areas of the Cape as she was also a capable mountaineer. It is estimated that she discovered about 150 Taxa and there are about 34 species and 2 genera named after her. The lichen species Xanthoparmelia esterhuyseniae was named in her honour in 1986 by the American lichenologist Mason Hale. In 1967, Louisa Bolus (another South African botanist) named a genera of plant (in the family Aizoaceae) from the Cape Provinces, Esterhuysenia.

In 1984, she discovered and collected a sample of Protea nubigena, the very rare Cloud Protea found in only one high-altitude site.

She was awarded an honorary Masters of Science Degree by the University of Cape Town in 1989. Generations of UCT students enjoyed her help and support in the herbarium.

== Personal life ==
Esterhuysen bicycled daily to and from her office. She was a trained pianist and a prolific botanical artist. She died in 2006, aged 93.

== Published works ==
- Esterhuysen, Elsie Elizabeth (1936). "Regeneration after clearing at Kirstenbosch". Journal of South African Botany. 2: 177–185.
