= Emma Laughlin =

United States botanist and botanical collector (1866–1962)

Emma Eliza Laughlin (1866-1962) was an American librarian, amateur botanist and educator known for her research on mustard plants and her vast herbarium. Though she had no formal botany education and worked as a high school teacher, she published extensively on the flora of Ohio, particularly rare plants, and founded the Barnesville, Ohio public library. She contributed her herbarium to Ohio State University.
