= Ethel de Fraine =

British botanist

Ethel Louise de Fraine
- Born: 2 November 1879; Aylesbury, Buckinghamshire, England
- Died: 25 March 1918 (aged 38); Falmouth, Cornwall, England
- Education: Attended Wyggeston High School For Girls
- Alma mater: University of London (D.Sc.)
- Awards: Fellow of the Linnean Society
- Scientific career
- Fields: Botany
- Institutions: Battersea Polytechnic; Westfield College

Ethel Louise de Fraine FLS (2 November 1879 – 25 March 1918) was a British botanist, morphologist and palaeobotanist. She investigated the seedling structure of the Cactaceæ and the rare fossil stem Sutcliffia.

== Life ==
De Fraine was born in Aylesbury, Buckinghamshire, England on 2 November 1879.

She received her D.Sc. from the University of London. She was a lecturer in botany at Battersea Polytechnic from 1910 to 1913 and then taught at Westfield College in 1915. She died at Falmouth, Cornwall, England on 25 March 1918.

== Work ==
De Fraine studied the relationship between the vascular structure of the plant stem and that of the primary root and contributed to the knowledge of seedling anatomy. Together with T. G. Hill, she published a series of four papers on the seedling structure of gymnosperms in the Annals of Botany between 1908 and 1910 as well as publishing another paper on the seedling anatomy of Cactaceae in the latter year.

She "concluded that whereas the study of seedlings was important from a taxonomic point of view, it had little to impart to the study of phylogeny. Although she ventured into the realm of fossil botany only once, the paper that she published on the structure and affinities of sutcliffiella was important. After taking part in ecological expeditions she published a treatise on the anatomy of salicornia and the common seaside glasswort. Her last publication was in 1916, on the morphology and anatomy of the genus Statice as studied from its habitat at Blakeney Point."
