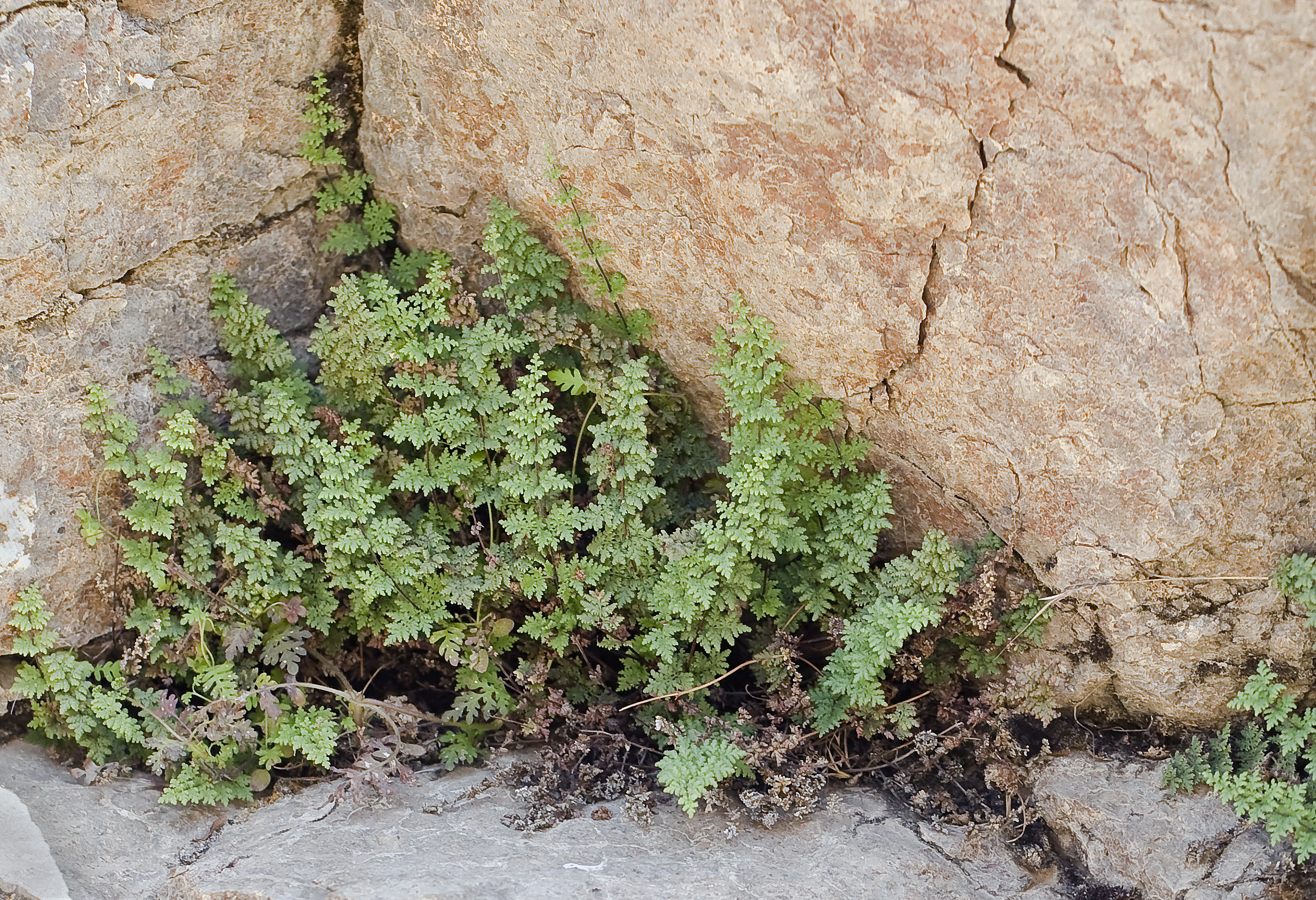

Conservation status
- Vulnerable (NatureServe)

Scientific classification
- Kingdom: Plantae
- Clade: Embryophytes
- Clade: Tracheophytes
- Division: Polypodiophyta
- Class: Polypodiopsida
- Order: Polypodiales
- Family: Pteridaceae
- Genus: Myriopteris
- Species: M. viscida

Binomial name
- Myriopteris viscida (Davenp.) Grusz & Windham

Synonyms
- Cheilanthes viscida Davenp.; Hemionitis viscida (Davenp.) Christenh.

= Myriopteris viscida =

Species of fern

Myriopteris viscida, formerly known as Cheilanthes viscida, is a species of lip fern known by the common names viscid lip fern and viscid lace fern.

It is native to southern California, at elevations of 100–1,600 meters (330–5,250 ft). It is an uncommon member of the flora in rocky areas of the higher Mojave Desert mountains, and in the ecotone of the Peninsular Ranges and the Colorado Desert. Its distribution extends into northern Baja California.

== Description ==
This fern produces frilly leaves up to about 30 centimeters (12 in) long, each divided into segments which are subdivided, the ultimate segments just a few millimeters long and widely lance-shaped to oblong. The leaf segments bear resin glands which exude a very sticky, clear fluid.

The leaves are also somewhat hairy. The leaf segments have curled edges along which are located the sori with their brown sporangia.

== Etymology ==
Members of the genus Cheilanthes as historically defined (which includes Myriopteris) are commonly known as "lip ferns" due to the lip-like (false) indusium formed by the leaf margins curling over the sori. The common name viscid lip fern refers to the sticky glands on the underside of the leaf described by the epithet.

== Conservation ==
NatureServe considers M. viscida globally vulnerable (G3) due to its limited distribution, although it is not considered threatened within California.
