= Edna H. Fawcett =

American botanist (1879–1960)

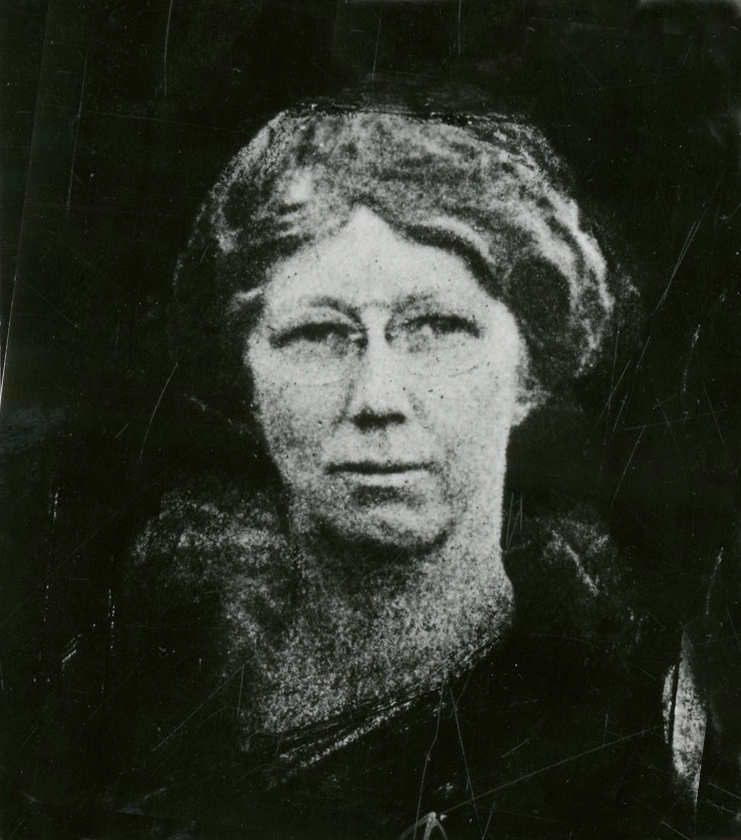
- Picture of Fawcett during her time in Department of Agriculture. Exact date unknown.
- Born: 1879
- Died: 1960 (aged 80–81)
- Education: Smith College, Barnard College
- Occupations: Botanist, Pedologist, Pathologist
- Known for: Stabilization of Boric Acid Buffers By Aeration; The Problem of Dilution in Colorimetric H-Ion Measurements
- Scientific career
- Workplaces: New York Botanical Garden, United States Department of Agriculture

Edna Hague Fawcett (1879 – 1960) was an American botanist and specialist on plant health problems.

== Life and career ==
Fawcett earned a bachelor's degree from Smith College in 1901. Around this same time, Fawcett held a temporary position as an assistant at a public school in Springfield, Massachusetts. She continued her studies at Barnard College before taking a position at the New York Botanical Garden. She joined the research staff of the Bureau of Plant Industry at the United States Department of Agriculture in 1906. Working her way up from a technician position, Fawcett eventually became an assistant pathologist in 1930.

Among her most notable written studies are Stabilization of Boric Acid Buffers By Aeration and The Problem of Dilution in Colorimetric H-Ion Measurements, which were both written in conjunction with S. F. Acree.
