= Charlotte Elliott (botanist) =

American plant physiologist

- Born: 1883
- Died: 1974 (aged 90–91)
- Education: Stanford University; University of Wisconsin, Madison
- Known for: research on plant disease vectors
- Scientific career
- Fields: botany, plant physiology
- Workplaces: USDA
- Patrons: Erwin Frink Smith
- Author abbrev. (botany): C.Elliott

Charlotte Elliott (1883–1974) was a pioneering American plant physiologist. She specialized in bacterial organisms that cause disease in crops, and was the author of the reference work Manual of Bacterial Plant Pathogens. She was the first woman to receive a Ph.D. in botany from the University of Wisconsin, Madison.

== Education ==
Elliott was born in Berlin, Wisconsin. She got her undergraduate degree in zoology at Stanford University in 1907. For a few years afterwards she taught biology at the state normal school in Spearfish and took summer courses at the University of Chicago. She returned to Stanford for master's work in plant physiology, receiving her A.M. in 1913. She was offered an appointment as assistant in the botany department but refused for reasons having to do with her family and instead returned to Wisconsin.

In Wisconsin, she worked for two years (1914–16) as an instructor at South Dakota State College of Agriculture and Mechanic Arts. She left to pursue graduate work in plant pathology, first as a research assistant at the Brooklyn Botanic Garden and then as a Ph.D. student at the University of Wisconsin, Madison, where she was supported by a Boston Alumne Fellowship. In 1918, she became the first woman to complete the doctoral program in botany at the University of Wisconsin, Madison. Her thesis work focused on halo blight, a disease affecting oats.

== Career ==
Elliott was recruited by the bacteriologist Erwin Frink Smith to work in the Bureau of Plant Industry at the United States Department of Agriculture (USDA). There she continued her research as a phytobacteriologist or specialist in the organisms harmful to plants, publishing numerous papers in her field. Among her scientifically notable papers is one establishing the role of the flea beetle as a vector in the development of the disease known as Stewart's wilt in corn (maize). This research led to a method for forecasting how bad the disease would be in any given year based on temperature indexes that reflected how successfully the beetles had survived the preceding winter. Her work also led to the description of several new species.

Elliott wrote a widely used book, Manual of Bacterial Plant Pathogens, first published in 1930, reissued with revisions in 1951, and still being drawn on by researchers today.

In 1942, she served as the president of the Botanical Society of Washington, making history as the first woman president of the society.

Elliott died in 1974.

== Selected publications ==
=== Books ===
- Manual of Bacterial Plant Pathogens (1930)
- Halo-Blight of Oats (1920)

=== Articles ===
- "Helminthosporium-Turcicum Leaf Blight of Corn". Phytopathology 36.8 (1946): 660–666. With Merle T. Jenkins.
- "Seasonal Development, Insect Vectors, and Host Range of Bacterial Wilt of Sweet Corn." Journal of Agricultural Research 60.10 (1940): 645–686. With F.W. Poos.
- "Dissemination of Bacterial Wilt of Corn." Iowa State College Journal of Science 9 (1935): 461–480.
- "Overwintering of Aplanobacter stewarti." Science 80.2074 (1934): 289–290. With F.W. Poos.
