= Mary K. Bryan =

American botanist (1877–1926)

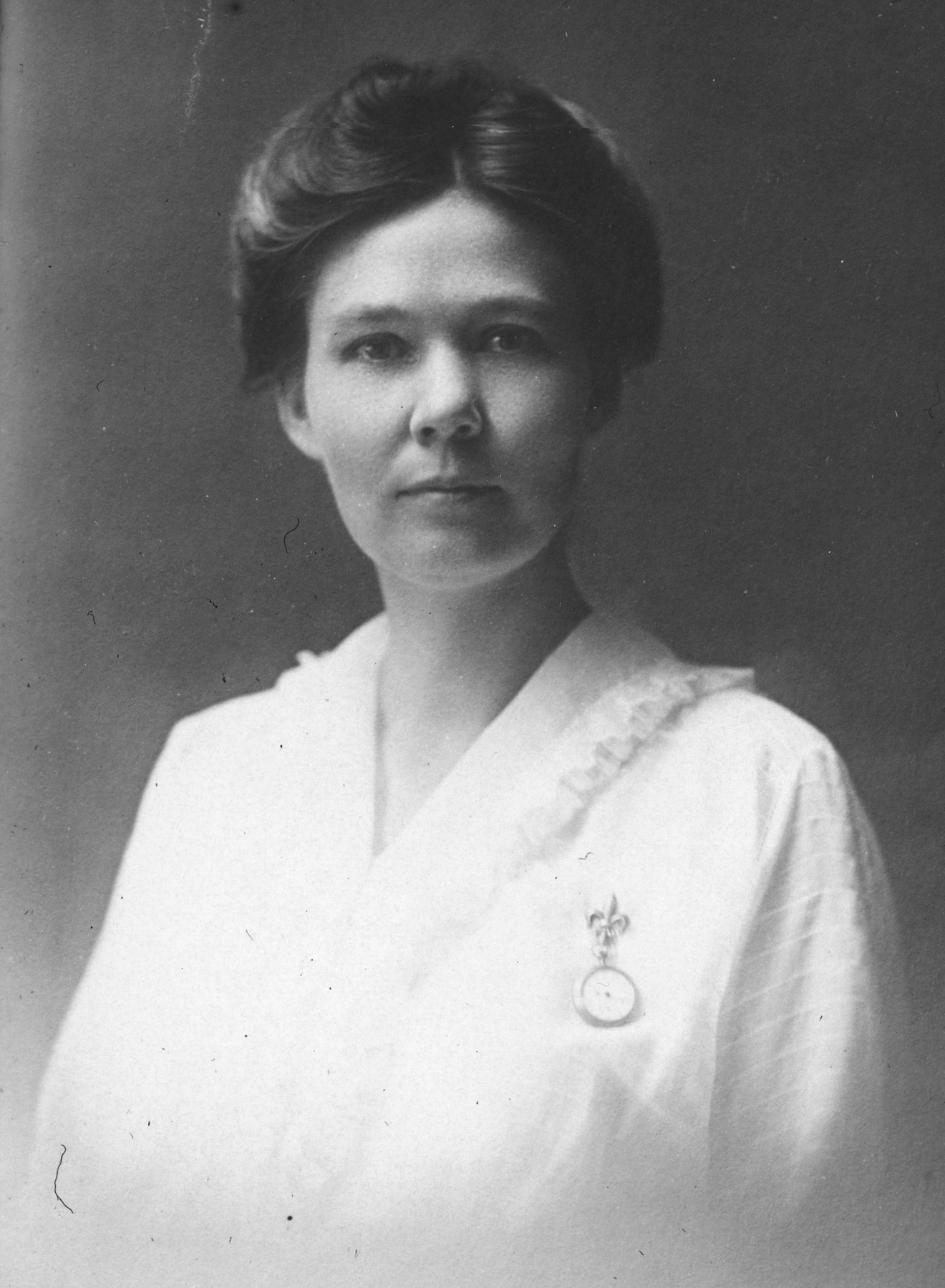
- Born: February 13, 1877; Prince George's County, Maryland
- Died: February 22, 1962 (aged 85); Napa, California
- Scientific career
- Fields: Botany, Phytopathology
- Author abbrev. (botany): Bryan

Mary Katherine Bryan (February 13, 1877 – February 22, 1962) was an American botanist and phytopathologist. Much of her research involved leaf spots and cankers caused by bacteria.

== Life and career ==
Bryan was born in Prince George's County, Maryland, on February 13, 1877. She earned a bachelor's degree from Stanford University in 1908. She worked at the Bureau of Plant Industry in the United States Department of Agriculture as a scientific assistant and assistant pathologist from 1909 to 1918.

She and Nellie A. Brown worked for Erwin Frink Smith.

Bryan died on February 22, 1962, in Napa, California.
