= Lucia McCulloch =

American botanist (1873–1955)

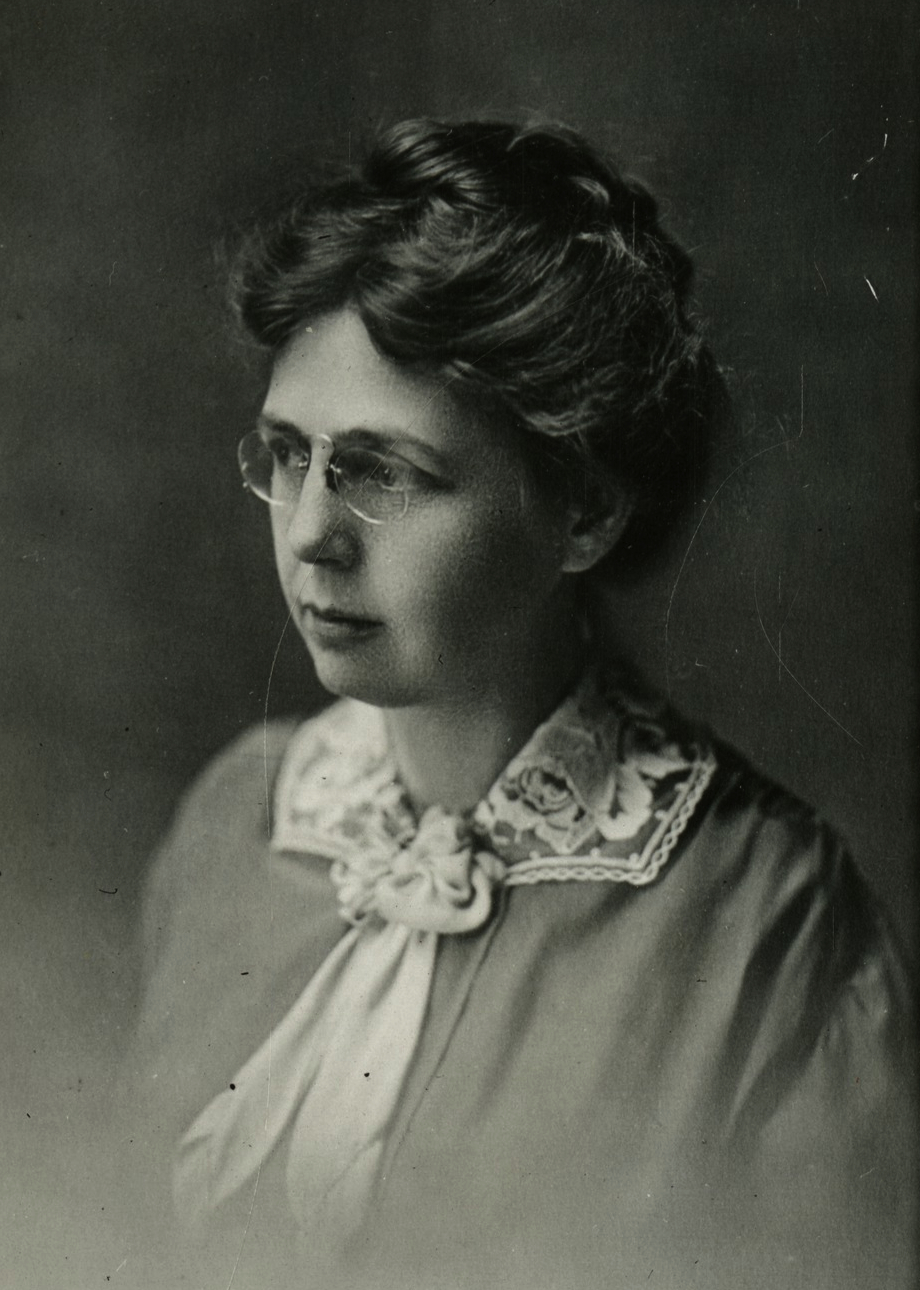
- McCulloch in 1915
- Born: February 26, 1873; Cincinnati, Ohio
- Died: February 10, 1955 (aged 81); Orlando, Florida
- Known for: Botany, Plant pathology
- Scientific career
- Institutions: United States Department of Agriculture
- Author abbrev. (botany): L.McCulloch

Lucia Alma McCulloch (February 26, 1873 – February 10, 1955) was an American botanist and plant pathologist in the United States Department of Agriculture Bureau of Plant Industry. Her work focused on crown gall and gladiolus diseases and pests. A colleague in the department run by Erwin Frink Smith, she also collaborated with botanist Nellie Adalesa Brown.

== Life and career ==
McCulloch was born in Cincinnati, Ohio. She was the daughter of Robert S. and Alma Taggart (née Eveleth) McCulloch. In 1898, while studying biology at Florida Agricultural College, she was appointed head of the library, now part of the George A. Smathers Libraries. She received her Bachelor of Science degree there in 1902. She was forced to resign June 30, 1903, after the (newly named) University of Florida became an all-male school. She was a scientific assistant and laboratory plant pathologist at the Bureau of Plant Industry, Department of Agriculture, in Washington, DC, in 1907.

She died in Orlando, Florida.
