= Nellie A. Brown =

American botanist (1876–1956)

- Brown in 1915
- Born: 1876
- Died: 1956 (aged 79–80)
- Education: University of Michigan
- Scientific career
- Fields: Botany; Phytopathology
- Workplaces: United States Department of Agriculture
- Author abbrev. (botany): N.A.Br.

Nellie Adalesa Brown (1876–1956) was an American botanist and government researcher. Much of her research focused on plant pathology. While working with Charles Orrin Townsend and Agnes J. Quirk as assistants for Erwin Frink Smith, Brown and her colleagues described Agrobacterium tumefaciens, the organism responsible for crown gall in 1907. They also identified methods of mitigation.

== Life and career ==
Brown graduated from University of Michigan in 1901 where she studied botany. While doing post-graduate work at University of California, Brown became a member of the Torrey Botanical Club. After teaching science in Michigan and Florida high schools for 5 years, Brown became a scientific investigator in Plant Pathology at the U.S. Department of Agriculture Bureau of Plant Industry from 1906 to 1910.

Brown was appointed assistant plant pathologist from 1910 to 1925 and appeared as the second author of two major studies on crown-galls in plants conducted by Erwin Frink Smith in 1911 and 1912. From 1915 to 1918 she began studying bacterial diseases in lettuce, and eventually published research under her own name. In 1924 she investigated apple stem-tumor, which she differentiated from crown-gall.

In the mid-twenties, Brown was promoted to associate pathologist, a position she held until her retirement in 1941.
