= Elsie Conway =

British botanist and phycologist

- Born: Elsie Phillips; 15 March 1902; Aldford, Cheshire, England
- Died: 22 July 1992 (aged 90); Chester, Cheshire, England
- Education: University of Liverpool
- Spouse: Geoffrey Conway (m. 1928; div. 1948)
- Children: John Conway
- Awards: FRSE (1967)
- Scientific career
- Fields: Phycology
- Workplaces: Durham University; University of Glasgow
- Thesis: (1925)
- Doctoral advisor: John McLean Thompson

Elsie Conway FRSE (née Phillips, 15 March 1902 – 22 July 1992) was a British phycologist. She served as president of the British Phycological Society from 1965 to 1967, and was one of the earliest women Fellows of the Royal Society of Edinburgh.

== Early life and education ==
Conway was born Elsie Phillips on 15 March 1902 in Aldford, Cheshire, England, the elder daughter of William and Margaret Phillips. She attended the Queen's School in Chester from 1912 to 1919. She then studied botany at the University of Liverpool, achieving a Bachelor of Science in 1922, Honours in 1923, and PhD in 1925. Contact with Margery Knight started her life-long interest in algae. However, her thesis, supervised by John McLean Thompson, was on floral morphology.

== Career ==
She was appointed to a lectureship in botany at Durham University in 1925, but, as was then the norm, gave it up when she married in 1928.

However, Conway returned to university life in 1938, at the University of Glasgow where she continued until retiring in 1969. Initially she was a part-time demonstrator but was appointed a lecturer in 1945 and promoted to senior lecturer in 1965.

Her research focused on red algae, especially the genus Porphyra. In 1942, as imports became disrupted by the Second World War she became part of a group investigating whether agar could be produced for pharmaceutical purposes from marine algae found around the UK coast. The collaborators included Sheina Marshall, Andrew Picken Orr and Lillie Newton. They developed the red algae Mastocarpus stellatus and Chondrus crispus as sources. Conway was also involved in a wartime project to remove bracken (Pteridium aquilinum) from land newly required for agriculture.

In 1952, in collaboration with Shelia Lodge, Elsie Burrows, and Harry Powell, she studied the coastline of Fair Isle, one of the Shetland islands, discovering that the intertidal zonation differed from other rocky shores around the United Kingdom due to the severe wave action and high local humidity.

In 1952 she was a co-founder of the British Phycological Society and later served as its president from 1965 to 1967. From 1967 to 1969 she was president of the Andersonian Naturalists of Glasgow, and vice-president of the Botanical Society of Edinburgh. She was elected a Fellow of the Royal Society of Edinburgh in 1967. Between 1955 and 1965, Conway was the editor of the British Phycological Bulletin.

After her retirement from Glasgow, Conway undertook a visiting professorship at the University of British Columbia between 1969 and 1970, and then, from 1970 to 1972, a professorial fellowship at the University of Otago, producing a taxonomic list of Stewart Island algae. She returned to British Columbia between 1972 and 1974 for further study of the genus Porphyra in Canada's northeast Pacific region.

== Publications ==
The standard author abbreviation E.Conway is used to indicate this person as the author when citing a botanical name.

- Clyde Seaweeds and Their Economic Uses (1942)
- The Raising of Intertidal Algal Zones on Fair Isle (1954)
- The Herbarium of British Algae in the Botanical Department of the University of Glasgow (1954)
- Water Soluble Polysaccharides of Porphyra Species (1962)
- Juvenile stages of the genus Porphyra (1966)
- Observations on an Unusual Form of Reproduction in Porphyra (1973)
- Porphyra in the Pacific (1973)
- The Marine Algae of Stewart Island, New Zealand (1974)
- The genus Porphyra in British Columbia and Washington (1976)

== Family and later life ==
On 28 June 1928 she married Geoffrey Seymour Conway, an England rugby union player and son of Robert Seymour Conway, at the Church of St Mary's-without the-Walls, Chester.

They had three sons. The eldest, John Conway, became a professor of history at the University of British Columbia. The second, Robert Conway, was a senior lecturer in radioastronomy at University of Manchester and the third son, Martin Conway, was president of the Selly Oak Colleges in Birmingham.

The couple divorced in 1948.

In later life she returned to live in Chester and died on 22 July 1992.
