= Kesteven and Grantham Girls' School =

Grammar school in Lincolnshire, England

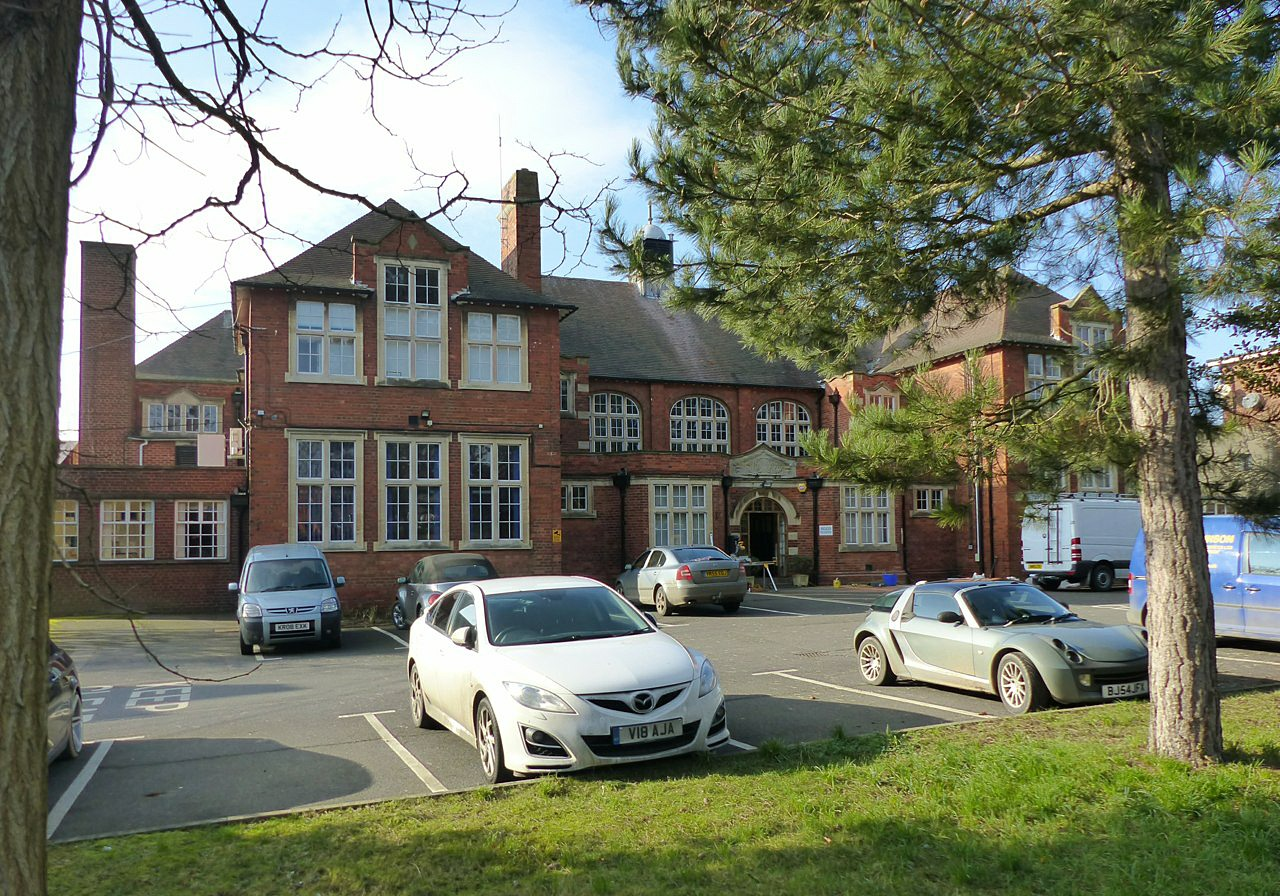

Location
- Sandon Road; Grantham, Lincolnshire, NG31 9AU; England; 52°54′48″N 0°38′01″W

Information
- Type: Grammar school; Academy
- Motto: Veras Hinc Ducere Voces (Latin); From this place, draw true inspiration.
- Established: 1910
- Department for Education URN: 138638 Tables
- Ofsted: Reports
- Head teacher: James Fuller
- Staff: 93
- Gender: Girls
- Age: 11 to 18
- Enrolment: 1200
- Houses: Austen, Brontë, Browning, Eliot, Potter, Rossetti.
- Website: http://www.kestevengrantham.lincs.sch.uk/

Kesteven and Grantham Girls' School (KGGS) is a grammar school with academy status for girls in Grantham, Lincolnshire, established in 1910. It has over 1000 pupils ranging from ages 11 to 18, and has its own sixth form.

== History ==
KGGS was founded in 1910 by H Gladys Williams. Before its establishment Kesteven Local Education Authority had founded the Grantham Institute, which accepted girls. A decision to found a new county grammar school for girls was made by a joint committee of county, borough and town councils. After the Board of Education recognised Grantham Institute as a secondary grammar school, and the girls' aspect within it, they appointed a principal mistress for the Institute, who would become the headmistress of a 1910 newly built school called Kesteven and Grantham Girls' Grammar School.

The former prime minister Margaret Thatcher was a pupil at the school between 1936 and 1943, and was head girl in her final year.

=== Second World War and evacuation ===
Girls from Camden School for Girls arrived on Thursday 19 October 1939. The girls had spent the previous few weeks resident in Uppingham in Rutland. The headteacher of the Camden school was Olive Wright. 450 girls were expected, but only 352 arrived. Girls from Grantham were in the classrooms in the mornings and Camden girls were in the afternoon. Camden girls were resident at Stonebridge House, which became the police station. The music teacher Grace Williams, a Welsh composer, arrived with the Camden school, and composed pieces whilst at Grantham. Zoologist Hilda Mabel Canter, later employed by the Freshwater Biological Association and associated with the British Phycological Society, was evacuated with the school.

Thirty-two Camden girls were confirmed at St Wulfram's Church, Grantham on Saturday 16 March 1940 by the bishop of Lincoln, Nugent Hicks. The Camden school had their own Girl Guide unit in Grantham.

On Friday 28 June 1940, two 17-year-old Camden girls, Margaret McMillan and Marjorie Catch, had their play A Man's World broadcast as part of Theatreland on the BBC Home Service and the BBC Forces Programme, introduced by Raymond Glendenning; it featured Celia Johnson and Owen Nares. The Camden girls left in March 1941 to go to Stamford High School, Lincolnshire for seven terms until summer 1943.

During the war, the hockey pitch was changed to grow hay instead. Many staff under their thirties from boys' schools had to join up; this situation did not really affect girls' schools as much. Elsie Suddaby, the famous soprano performed at the school, through Grantham Music Club, on Friday 18 October 1940. Isolde Menges, the violinist, performed on Friday 22 November 1940 at the school Colonel William Vere Reeve King-Fane was Chairman of the Governors from December 1940, until his death in 1943. The preparatory school closed in 1944.

=== School expansion after the war ===
In December 1947, the prize day was in the drill hall. A new association was formed with a French school in Châteauroux in Centre-Val de Loire. In early 1954 the school needed more buildings to have a three-form entry by September 1955. New buildings were added around 1955, costing £50,000 for an extra form entry. In February 1955 a contract for £57,900 built an extension and a new kitchen, with furniture costing £5,500. By 1956, there were over 500 girls at the school.

The extensions opened on Friday 11 October 1957, for a three-form entry school, with a new gym, hall and dining room, and crafts room with a hand loom with the bishop of Grantham Anthony Otter attending the ceremony and the chair of the governors Alf Roberts, with T.W. Golby, the director of education at Kesteven, and F.W. Jenkinson, chairman of Kesteven council. The head girl was Andrea Thody. By 1957, from 1910 there had been only two headteachers. Due to the larger school, the houses Rossetti and Potter were introduced in 1958.

When prime minister Margaret Thatcher visited on Friday 12 February 1982 there were 150 protesters, who mostly chanted 'Tories Out'. The PM also visited Friday 4 July 1986. In 1992 the former PM would become Baroness Thatcher of Kesteven, in reference to her old school.

== Curriculum ==
Kesteven Grantham Girls' School provides a curriculum across Key Stage 3 to 5. The sixth form curriculum is enhanced by cooperation with the nearby King's School.

== Form and house activity ==
Each form has a form captain and deputy, two school council members and two charity representatives. Form captains deal with problems and represent the form. A school council discusses matters and acts to improve the school and its community. Charity events are organised by forms to raise money for good causes, with a trophy given each year to the form which raises the most.

Pupils are allotted to one of six houses within the school, named after famous female writers and poets: Austen, Brontë, Browning, Eliot, Potter, and Rossetti. Each house has its own colour: Austen is purple, Potter is green, Rossetti is red, Bronte is white, Browning is brown and Elliot is yellow. Houses are headed by two year 13 house captains. The house system is maintained and supervised by three year 13 house secretaries and one member of staff.

== Sport ==
The school won the U-19 Championships of the English Schools' Table Tennis Association (ESTTA) three times in a row from 2009 to 2011, and had also won it, 1986–88; the representative of the English Table Tennis Association for the East Midlands, Suzanne Airey, went to KGGS.

== Extracurricular activity ==
There are school exchange programmes with Germany, France and Japan; many girls undertake one of these opportunities each year. The school's connection with Minami High School, Fukushima, Japan, involves a group of Japanese students visiting Grantham each year.

== Notable former pupils ==
- Georgina Callaghan, singer-songwriter, known for her 2012 album Life in Full Colour
- Freya Colbert, swimmer
- Dorothy Cowlin, novelist
- Valerie Gibson, professor in high energy physics at the University of Cambridge
- Vikki Hubbard, high jumper
- Holly Humberstone, singer-songwriter
- Amy Hunt, sprinter
- Shona McCallin, member of the Great Britain women's national field hockey team
- Frances Ryan, author of Crippled
- Jane Soons, University of Canterbury's first female professor
- Doris Stokes, medium
- Margaret Thatcher, Prime Minister of the United Kingdom
- Clare Tomlinson, Sky Sports
- Frances Tustin, psychotherapist
