= Lily Newton =

Botanist (1893-1981)

Lily Newton FLS
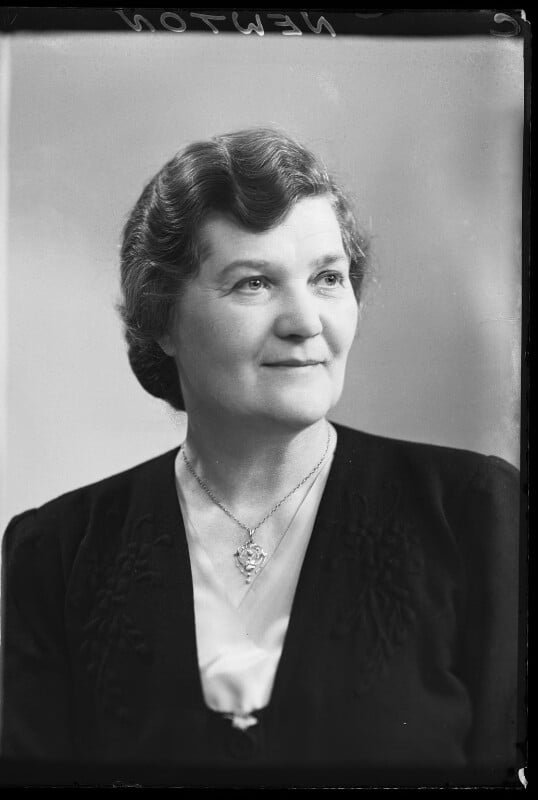
- Newton in 1949
- Born: Lily Batten; 26 January 1893; Pensford, Somerset, England
- Died: 26 March 1981 (aged 88); Pontardawe, Wales
- Education: Colston's Girls' School
- Alma mater: University of Bristol (BSc, MSc, PhD, DSc)
- Known for: Vice Principal of University of Wales
- Spouse: William Charles Frank Newton (m. 1925; died 1927)
- Awards: Vincent Stuckey Lean scholarship in Botany, 1916
- Scientific career
- Fields: Botany, Phycology
- Institutions: Birkbeck College, University of London; Imperial College London; John Innes Horticultural Institute; University of Wales, Aberystwyth
- Thesis: The British Species of the Genus Polysiphona (1921)
- Doctoral students: Mary Gillham
- Author abbrev. (botany): L.Newton

Principal of University of Wales, Aberystwyth

Acting
- In office 1952 - 1953
- Preceded by: Ifor Leslie Evans
- Succeeded by: Goronwy Rees

Lily Newton, born Lily Batten (26 January 1893 – 26 March 1981) was professor of botany and vice-principal at the University of Wales.

== Early life and education ==
Newton was born Lily Batten in Pensford, Somerset in 1893, the daughter of George and Melinda Batten. She attended Colston’s Girls' School, Bristol, where she was captain of school. She studied geology and botany at the University of Bristol, where she was awarded the Vincent Stuckey Lean scholarship in botany and graduated with a first class honours degree. Newton stayed on at Bristol for her postgraduate studies, earning her PhD in 1921 with her thesis titled, The British Species of the Genus Polysiphona. She was the first student awarded a PhD by the University of Bristol in any subject.

== Career ==
She became assistant lecturer in Botany at Bristol in 1919, before moving to Birkbeck College, University of London the next year. She worked as lecturer in botany until 1923, and then held a research post at the Imperial College of Science until her marriage to William Charles Frank Newton in 1925. From then until his death in 1927 she assisted him, including visiting the British Museum on his behalf. From 1927 to 1928, she worked for the John Innes Horticultural Institute.

In 1928, Newton moved to Wales, becoming lecturer in botany at the University of Wales, Aberystwyth. She was promoted to professor and chair of botany in 1930, becoming the first woman to be made Head of Department at Aberystwyth. Under her guidance, her department achieved a considerable reputation both in Wales and beyond. There was a striking increase in the number of students, and a vigorous research programme was undertaken, closely related to local issues.

She was Vice-Principal of the University of Wales 1951-52, and then, following the sudden death of Ifor Leslie Evans, Acting Principal 1952-53. In 1959, she was appointed Emeritus Professor; she received an honorary LLD from the University of Wales in 1973. She taught across a broad range of botany including both living and fossil plants. Her students were reported to remembered her as a dedicated teacher, whose lectures were always clear, well illustrated and a model of succinctness. She is described as an imposing person and a strict disciplinarian, but also as a kindly person, who would give help when it was needed. During her time, the botany department was based on the Promenade. Although the move to Penglais was made after her retirement, she made a major contribution to the design, equipping and layout of the new building.

She published widely on plant distribution and seaweeds. Her first major publication, A Handbook of the British Seaweeds, was published in 1931. The majority of it is made up of a systematic treatment of around 750 species of algae, occurring round the coasts of the British Isles. It has been described as a work of outstanding scholarship and was still used 50 years later. During the Second World War, the Ministry of Health was concerned about a possible shortage of agar, essential for scientific, food and medicinal purposes. This applied particularly after Pearl Harbor when Japanese supplies were cut off. Newton was asked to coordinate botanical work involving large scale production of agar from suitable British seaweeds. She served on the Vegetable Drugs Committee of the Ministries of Supply and Health. In addition, she was responsible for the field surveys in Wales and north of the Firth of Lorn, for the work on Gigartina stellata and Chondrus crispus, and for editing the published volume.

Following the pioneering work by Kathleen E. Carpenter, Newton's studies on river pollution commenced with an interdisciplinary project on the River Rheidol at Aberystwyth in the 1930s. Mining operations in the 19th century meant the river was polluted with lead and zinc that adversely affected plant and animal life. The river was monitored until its almost complete recovery as a major salmon river in the late 1960s. This project is said to have anticipated modern studies in this field by many years. She was consulted subsequently on the biological effects of pollution in connection with a number of major industrial projects. She acted as consultant to the Rheidol Hydro-Electric Scheme.

Newton held the presidency of a number of societies; these included Section K of the British Association, 1949; the British Phycological Society, 1955–57, and the UK Federation for Education in Home Economics, 1957-63. She played an important role in the early work of the Nature Conservancy Council in Wales.

== Personal life and death ==
She married Dr William Charles Frank Newton in 1925, a cytologist at the John Innes Horticultural Institute. She was widowed two years later. From 1927 to 1928 she helped to prepare much of her late husband’s work for publication.

Newton died at Pontardawe, near Swansea on 26 March 1981.

== Selected publications ==
The standard author abbreviation L.Newton is used to indicate this person as the author when citing a botanical name.

- Batten, L. 1918. Observations on the ecology of Epilobium hirsutum. J. Ecol., 6: 161-177.
- Batten, L. 1923. The genus Polysiphonia, Grev., a critical revision of the British species based upon anatomy. J. Linn. Soc., Botany, 46: 271-311.
- Newton, L. A handbook of the British seaweeds. London: British Museum, 1931
- Newton, L. Plant distribution in the Aberystwyth district: including Plynlimon and Cader Idris. Aberystwyth: Cambrian News, 1933
- Marshall, S.M., Newton, L., Orr, A.P., A study of certain British seaweeds and their utilisation in the preparation of agar. London: His Majesty's Stationery Office, 1949
- Newton, L. Seaweed utilisation. London: Sampson Low, 1951
