= Geoffrey Seymour Conway =

England international rugby union player & British Army officer

Geoffrey Seymour Conway MC TD
- Born: 15 November 1897 Llandaff, Wales
- Died: 3 September 1984 (aged 86) Stranraer, Scotland
- School: Fettes College
- University: University of Cambridge
- Notable relative(s): Robert S. Conway (father); Elsie Conway (wife); John S. Conway (son)

Rugby union career
- Position: Forward
International career
Years	Team	Apps	(Points)
1920–27	England	18	(25)

Lieutenant colonel Geoffrey Seymour Conway (15 November 1897 – 3 September 1984) was an English military officer, scholar and international rugby union player of the 1920s.

== Biography ==
Born Llandaff, Wales, Conway was the son of classical scholar Robert Seymour Conway, at the time a Cardiff-based academic. He was educated at Edinburgh's Fettes College and studied for an honours degree in classics at the University of Cambridge, where he gained rugby blues.

Conway served as a Royal Garrison Artillery officer during World War I and was awarded a Military Cross.

A forward, Conway was capped 18 times for England from 1920 to 1927, playing in both the second and back rows of the scrum. His England career included three Five Nations grand slam-winning campaigns and a match against the All Blacks at Twickenham, which was one of only two occasions he finished on a losing team. He made further representative appearances for the Durham and Warwickshire county sides.

Conway met his wife, phycologist Elsie Conway, while both were on the academic staff of University College, Durham. Their three sons all went into academia, including historian John S. Conway, the eldest of the brothers.

== See also ==
- List of England national rugby union players
