= George Montgomery (pathologist) =

Scottish pathologist and medical author

George Lightbody Montgomery CBE FRSE TD (3 November 1905 – 5 February 1993) was a 20th-century Scottish pathologist and medical author, holding multiple senior positions in the Scottish medical profession.

== Life ==
He was born on 3 November 1905 in Glasgow the son of Jeanie Lightbody and John Montgomery. He attended Hillhead High School then studied medicine at the University of Glasgow graduating with an MB ChB in 1928. In 1931 he began lecturing in clinical pathology at the University of St Andrews, also gaining a doctorate there (PhD) in 1937. In 1937 he moved home to Glasgow as a lecturer in pathology and pathologist to several hospitals.

In World War II he reached the rank of Brigadier in the Royal Army Medical Corps mainly serving in the Middle and Far East, in particular Burma. Returning to Glasgow after the war he was given a professorship, the St Mungo-Notman chair, at the University of Glasgow in 1948.

In 1950 he was elected a Fellow of the Royal Society of Edinburgh. His proposers were Norman Davidson, Robert Garry, Alexander Murray Drennan and Charles Wynford Parsons.

In 1954 he moved to the University of Edinburgh and remained there until his retirement in 1971. In 1956 he was elected a member of the Harveian Society of Edinburgh and served as President in 1975. In 1958 he was elected a member of the Aesculapian Club.

He died in Edinburgh on 5 February 1993.

== Positions of Note ==
- Chairman of the Scottish Health Services Council 1954 - 1959
- Dean of the Faculty of Medicine 1955-1957
- Chairman of the Edinburgh Postgraduate Board of Medicine 1966-1970
- Vice President of the Royal Society of Edinburgh 1962-1965
- Vice President of the Royal College of Pathologists
- President of the Harveian Society of Edinburgh 1975

== Publications ==
- Pathology for Students of Dentistry (1953)
- Textbook of Pathology (1965)

== Family ==
In 1933 he married Margaret Forbes. They had one daughter Marjory and one son John.
