= Andrew Picken Orr =

Scottish oceanographer and plankton biologist (1898-1962)

Andrew Picken Orr FRSE
- Born: 6 August 1898; Ayrshire, Scotland
- Died: 19 September 1962 (aged 64); Millport, Buteshire, Scotland
- Education: Kilmarnock Academy
- Alma mater: University of Glasgow
- Spouse: Rachel Orr
- Children: 1 son, 1 daughter
- Scientific career
- Fields: Oceanography, chemistry
- Workplaces: Millport Marine Biological Station
- Military career
- Allegiance: United Kingdom
- Branch: British Army
- Service years: 1917-1918
- Rank: Second lieutenant
- Units: Glasgow and Strathclyde UOTC; Royal Scots Fusiliers
- Conflicts: World War I

Andrew Picken Orr FRSE ARIC (1898–1962) was a 20th-century Scottish oceanographer and was an expert on phytoplankton and copepod biology.

== Early life and education ==
Orr was born in Ayrshire on 6 August 1898. He was educated at Kilmarnock Academy before enrolling at the University of Glasgow. His university education was interrupted by the First World War. He joined Glasgow's University Officers' Training Corps before being commissioned with the Royal Scots Fusiliers in 1917, serving as a Second Lieutenant. He served in France and was wounded in action then captured as a prisoner-of-war.

After the war, Orr continued his university education at Glasgow, studying Geology and Chemistry. He graduated with MA and BSc degrees, specialising in Pure Chemistry.

== Scientific career ==
After graduating from university, for a time, Orr worked at Glasgow's Institute of Physiology under Dr Noel Paton, working on research funded by the Medical Research Council.

In 1923 he became a chemist at the Millport Research Station and in 1928 was part of the Great Barrier Reef Expedition (led by Sir Maurice Yonge) with Sheina Marshall, subsequently working with her for around 40 years in total. During the Second World War, they worked with Lily Newton and Elsie Conway on sourcing of pharmaceutical agar from UK marine algae. Orr rose to be Deputy Director of the station and was acting director at the time of his death.

== Honours and recognition ==
In 1934, Orr received an honorary DSc from the University of Glasgow. In 1948 he was elected a Fellow of the Royal Society of Edinburgh. His proposers were Sir Maurice Yonge, Charles Wynford Parsons, Otto Lowenstein and James Wilfred Cook.

== Personal life ==
Orr was married to his wife Rachel, with whom he had one son and one daughter. He died on 19 September 1962, survived by his wife and children.

Following his death, Sheina Marshall succeeded him as Deputy Director at Millport. When she retired in 1964, a collection of papers on contemporary marine biology research was published as a tribute to both Marshall and Orr's careers.

== Publications ==
- With Sheina Marshall:
  - 1931 - Sedimentation on Low Isles Reef
  - 1955 - The Biology of a Marine Copepod
  - 1955 - On the Biology of Calanus Finmarchicus
  - 1969 - The Fertile Sea: being the Buckland lectures for 1957
- With Sheina Marshall and Lily Newton:
  - 1949 - A study of certain British seaweeds and their utilisation in the preparation of agar.
