= John Walter Guerrier Lund =

English scientist (1912–2015)

John Lund
- Born: John Walter Guerrier Lund; 27 November 1912
- Died: 21 March 2015 (aged 102)
- Education: University of Manchester (BSc, MSc); University of London (PhD)
- Spouse: Hilda M. Canter (m. 1949)
- Children: one son, one daughter
- Awards: FRS (1963); CBE (1975)
- Scientific career
- Fields: Botany; Phycology
- Workplaces: University of Sheffield

John Walter Guerrier Lund CBE FRS (27 November 1912 – 21 March 2015) was an English phycologist.

== Early life and education ==
Lund was born in 1912 and was educated at Sedbergh School. He studied for his Bachelor of Science and Master of Science degrees at the University of Manchester, before moving to the University of London in 1935. He was awarded his PhD in 1939 and his DSc in 1951. In 1949 he married Hilda Mabel Canter and they had two children together.

== Career ==
He worked for a time as a Lecturer at the University of Sheffield, and then joined the West Midlands Forensic Science Laboratory as Staff Biologist. While there he worked on the case of the unsolved murder victim who has become known as Wych Elm Bella.

In 1944 he joined the Freshwater Biological Association (FBA) as Scientific Officer for algology, moving to Windermere with the Association's Fritsch Collection of Freshwater Algae in 1954. He retired in 1978, was appointed Deputy chief scientific officer and then Honorary Advisor to the FBA. In 1991 he was elected an FBA Honorary Fellow, and continued to work at the Ferry House laboratory until 2005.

His papers are now held in the archives of the Freshwater Biological Association.

=== Honours and awards ===
Lund was President of the British Phycological Society in 1957. He was elected a Fellow of the Royal Society (FRS) in 1963 and made Commander of the Most Excellent Order of the British Empire (CBE) in 1975. In 1975 he and Hilda Mabel Canter-Lund received the Prescott Award from the Phycological Society of America "for publication of the best book about algae", namely Freshwater Algae: Their Microscopic World Explored published in 1995.
