= Margaret Trevena Martin =

British botanist

Margaret Trevena Martin (1905–2000) was a British botanist and phycologist noted for identifying several species of South African Rhodophyceae.

== Career ==
She worked at University College of North Wales, Bangor.

In 1937 she was inducted into the Linnean Society of London.

Martin was a co-founder of the British Phycological Society with her friend and fellow phycologist Kathleen Mary Drew-Baker and later served as Vice President of the organisation.

Her collection of algal specimens is house in the herbarium of the National Museum of Wales in Cardiff.

== Author abbreviation ==
The standard author abbreviation M.T.Martin is used to indicate this person as the author when citing a botanical name.

== Works ==
- Martin, Margaret T. (August 1936). "The structure and reproduction of Chaetangium saccatum (Lam.) J. Ag.-I. Vegetative structure and male plants". Proceedings of the Linnean Society of London. 148 (3): 165–181. doi:10.1111/j.1095-8312.1936.tb00113.x.
- Martin, Margaret T. (October 1939). "The structure and reproduction of Chaetangium saccatum (Lamour.) J. Ag.-II. Female plants". Journal of the Linnean Society of London, Botany. 52 (342): 115–144. doi:10.1111/j.1095-8339.1939.tb01599.x.
- Martin, Margaret T.; Pocock, M. A. (January 1947). "Some South African Rhodophyceae. II. Helminthora Furcellata (Reinbold Apud Tyson), Comb. Nov". Transactions of the Royal Society of South Africa. 31 (4): 371–379. Bibcode:1947TRSSA..31..371M. doi:10.1080/00359194709518947.
- Martin, Margaret T.; Pocock, Mary A. (October 1953). "South African parasitic Florideae and their hosts. 2. Some South African parasitic Florideae". Journal of the Linnean Society of London, Botany. 55 (356): 48–64. doi:10.1111/j.1095-8339.1953.tb00003.x.
