= List of fellows of the Royal Society elected in 1963 =

Fellows of the Royal Society elected in 1963.

== Fellows ==
1. Sir John Bertram Adams
2. Eric Ashby, Baron Ashby
3. Horace Newton Barber
4. Eric Henry Stoneley Burhop
5. Harold Garnet Callan
6. John William Scott Cassels
7. Thomas Neville George
8. Sir James Learmonth Gowans
9. Sir Peter Bernhard Hirsch
10. John Herbert Humphrey
11. Peter Leslie Krohn
12. Dietrich Kuchemann
13. Michael Selwyn Longuet-Higgins
14. John Freeman Loutit
15. John Walter Guerrier Lund
16. Sheina Macalister Marshall
17. Paul Taunton Matthews
18. Bernard Yarnton Mills
19. Charles Garrett Phillips
20. John Alexander Fraser Roberts
21. Leonard Rotherham
22. Thomas Stevens Stevens
23. Sir Theodore Morris Sugden
24. David Tabor
25. Arthur James Cochran Wilson

== Foreign members ==
1. Emmanuel Faure-Fremiet
2. Karl Johann Freudenberg
3. Sewall Wright
4. Hideki Yukawa

== Statute 12 fellow ==
1. Sir Isaac Wolfson
