= John S. Conway (historian) =

Canadian historian (1929–2017)

- Born: 31 December 1929; London, England
- Died: 23 June 2017 (aged 87); Vancouver, Canada
- Citizenship: Canadian
- Education: MA (Cantab) and PhD, history, St John's College, Cambridge
- Occupations: Professor of History, University of British Columbia
- Known for: Holocaust research
- Notable work: The Nazi Persecution of the Churches 1933–1945 (1968)
- Spouse: Ann Conway
- Children: Three
- Relatives: Robert Seymour Conway; Katharine Glasier

John Seymour Conway (31 December 1929 – 23 June 2017) was professor emeritus of History at the University of British Columbia, where he taught for almost 40 years. His work focused on the role of the Vatican and German churches during the Holocaust; on 20th-century Christian–Jewish relations; and on the Holocaust in Hungary and Slovakia.

Author of the landmark study The Nazi Persecution of the Churches 1933–1945 (1968), Conway was one of the founding contributors, in 1970, to the Scholars' Conference on the Church Struggles and the Holocaust. He was awarded the Queen's Silver Jubilee Medal in 1977.

== Early life and education ==
Conway was born, one of three boys, in London, England, to Elsie Conway, a marine biologist, and Geoffrey Seymour Conway. He came from a family that prized education. His mother was a graduate of Glasgow University; his father had graduated from Cambridge. Conway's paternal grandfather was the classicist Robert Seymour Conway. Katharine Glasier, the teacher and Independent Labour Party politician, was his great-aunt.

After attending Sedbergh School, an independent school in Cumbria, Conway joined the British Army in 1948 as a conscript, working in intelligence in Austria. After being allowed to leave the army six months early to pursue his studies, he began reading English literature at St John's College, Cambridge, before switching to history. He completed both his BA and PhD at St John's.

== Career ==
In 1955 Conway moved to Canada and taught international relations at the University of Manitoba. He had to return to England to defend his thesis and met his wife, Ann, on the boat on the way back to Canada. In 1957 Conway joined the history department at the University of British Columbia (UBC) in 1957, teaching modern European history and international relations. His 474-page study, The Nazi Persecution of the Churches 1933–1945, was published in 1968 in London by Weidenfeld & Nicolson. The book examined the position of several Christian churches during the Third Reich, including the Catholics, Methodists, Baptists and Jehovah's Witnesses. Conway also wrote papers on the role of the government and Jewish organizations during the Holocaust in Hungary and Slovakia, and about Rudolf Vrba, the Auschwitz escapee. On the role of the churches, he wrote:

The German churches were trapped in a situation which exposed their every weakness and encouraged every temptation. Humanly speaking, their leaders, by collaborating with the Nazis, were no more and no less guilty than the rest of their fellow countrymen. But, as custodians of the Christian Gospel, their conduct must be judged by different standards. Their readiness to allow the truths of the Christian faith to be distorted for the purposes of political expediency, and their failure to denounce the crimes so openly committed in their society, place a heavy burden of guilt upon them.

Conway spent nearly 40 years at UBC; he was appointed professor emeritus when he retired in 1995. In 1998 he became the Smallman Distinguished Visiting professor in the Department of History at the University of Western Ontario. He sat on the editorial boards of Kirchliche Zeitgeschichte and the Journal of Holocaust and Genocide Studies; from 1995 he was also director of the Association of Contemporary Church Historians and editor of their newsletter. He delivered a lecture at Yad Vashem in Jerusalem in 1993.

Conway was a member of the Anglican Diocese of New Westminster's Refugee Liaison Committee. On the UBC campus, he had been long associated with the Student Christian Movement, and the World University Service of Canada (WUSC), for which he acted for many years as faculty advisor. He was a member of St James' Anglican Church in Vancouver.

== Selected works ==
- (1965). Conway, John S. "The Silence of Pope Pius XII". The Review of Politics. 27(1):105–131. JSTOR 1405429
- (1968). Conway, John S. The Nazi persecution of the Churches 1933–1945. London: Weidenfeld & Nicolson. ISBN 0-297-76315-6. Reissued in 1997 and 2001 by Regent College Publishing, Vancouver.
  - (1969). Conway, John S. La Persécution Nazie des Églises, 1933–1945. Paris: Éditions France-Empire.
  - (1969). Conway, John S. Die Nationalsozialistische Kirchenpolitik 1933–1945: Ihre Ziele, Widersprüche und Fehlschläge. Munich: Kaiser.
- (1973). Conway, John S. "The Vatican, Great Britain, and Relations with Germany, 1938–1940". The Historical Journal. 16(1): 147–167. JSTOR 2637920
- (1973). Conway, John S. "Between Apprehension and Indifference: Allied Attitudes to the Destruction of Hungarian Jewry". Wiener Library Bulletin. 1973/4: 37–48.
- (1974). Conway, John S. "The Churches, the Slovak State and the Jews 1939–1945". The Slavonic and East European Review. 52(126): 85–112. JSTOR 4206836
- (1977). Conway, John S. Visit to the Tibetan settlements in northern India, 1977. New Westminster, B.C.: Institute of Environmental Studies, Douglas College.
- (1978). Conway, John S. Bourgeois German Pacifism during the First World War. Papers of the Canadian Historical Association.
- (1979). Conway, John S. "Frühe Augenzeugenberichte aus Auschwitz" [Early Eyewitness Accounts of Auschwitz]. Vierteljahrshefte für Zeitgeschichte. 27: 260–294.
- (1980). Conway, John S. "The Holocaust and the Historians". The Annals of the American Academy of Political and Social Science. 450(1): 153–164. JSTOR 1042565
- (1980). Conway, John S. "The Churches", in Henry Friedlander and Sybil Milton (eds.). The Holocaust: Ideology, Bureaucracy, and Genocide. Millwood, New York: Kraus International Publications.
- (1984). Conway, John S. (1984). "Der Holocaust in Ungarn. Neue Kontroversen und Überlegungen" [The Holocaust in Hungary. New Controversies and Reflections]. Vierteljahrshefte für Zeitgeschichte. 32 (2): 179–212. JSTOR 30195267. PMID 11636199.
- (1984). Conway, John S. "The First Report about Auschwitz". Simon Wiesenthal Center Annual, 1: 133–151.
- (1984). Conway, John S. "Christians and Jews After the Holocaust: New Views in German Theology". Shofar. 2(3): 21–22. JSTOR 42941142
- (1986). Conway, John S. "The Holocaust in Hungary: Recent Controversies and Reconsiderations", in Randolph L. Braham (ed.). The Tragedy of Hungarian Jewry: Essays, Documents, Depositions. New York: Institute of Holocaust Studies, City University of New York.
- (1986). Conway, John S. "Protestant Missions to the Jews 1810–1980: Ecclesiastical Imperialism or Theological Aberration?". Holocaust and Genocide Studies 1(1):127–146. doi:10.1093/hgs/1.1.127
- (1987). Conway, John S. "Catholicism and the Jews during the Nazi Period and After", in Otto Dov Kulka and Paul R. Mendes-Flohr (eds.). Judaism and Christianity under the Impact of National Socialism. Jerusalem: Historical Society for Israel, 435–451.
- (1989). Conway, John S. "Canada and the Holocaust", in Yehuda Bauer et al. (eds.). Remembering for the Future: Working Papers and Addenda. Vol. 1: Jews and Christians during and after the Holocaust. Oxford: Pergamon Press, 296–305.
- (1991). Conway, John S. "Remembering the Holocaust". The Sewanee Review. 99(2): 286–295. JSTOR 27546361
- (1994). Conway, John S. "The Vatican, Germany and the Holocaust", in Peter Kent, John Francis Pollard (eds.). Papal Diplomacy in the Modern Age. Praeger.
- (1994). Conway, John S. "The Stasi and the Churches: Between Coercion and Compromise in East German Protestantism, 1949–89". Journal of Church and State.
- (1995). Conway, John S. "Christian-Jewish Relations during the Fifties". Kirchliche Zeitgeschichte. 3(1): 11–27. JSTOR 43750632
- (2002). Conway, John S. "The Significance of the Vrba–Wetzler Report on Auschwitz-Birkenau". In Vrba, Rudolf (ed.). I Escaped from Auschwitz. Fort Lee: Barricade Books. pp. 289–324.
- (2005). Conway, John S. "Flucht aus Auschwitz: Sechzig Jahre danach later". Vierteljahrshefte für Zeitgeschichte. 53 (3): 461–472. Archived from the original on 19 July 2011.
