= Joanna M. Kain =

New Zealand born British botanist and marine biologist (1930–2017)

- Born: Dorothy Kain; 1930; Christchurch, New Zealand
- Died: 21 July 2017 (aged 86–87); Canberra, ACT, Australia
- Education: University College London
- Known for: Research into ecology of macroalgae
- Partner: Norman Jones
- Children: 2
- Scientific career
- Fields: Phycology
- Workplaces: Port Erin Marine Biological Station
- Doctoral advisor: Gordon Elliott Fogg
- Author abbrev. (botany): J.M.Kain

Joanna M. Kain (Jones) (born Dorothy Kain, 1930 – 21 July 2017) was a New Zealand-born British phycologist, marine biologist and diver. She researched kelp forest ecology adding to the scientific knowledge on its population, reproduction, competition and growth as well as descriptions of subcanopy seaweeds found in kelp forests. She was president of the British Phycological Society from 1987 to 1988.

== Early life ==
Kain was born in Christchurch, New Zealand, in 1930 to an English mother and a New Zealand father. The family relocated to London when she was two and she spent much of her life there. Her father named her Dorothy, but her mother, who never liked the name decided to call her Anne. When she was 10, Kain herself decided to settle the conflict and changed her first name to Joanna, "after her favourite doll."

When she enrolled at the University College London (UCL) in 1949, she studied marine algae, but the College did not sponsor field trips to ocean locations, so she had to accompany nearby Bedford College students when they took trips to the Isle of Man. There she learned that she wanted to study dynamic intertidal zones around the Isle of Wight, and the ecology of macroalgae.

Kain accepted an offer from UCL to pursue her PhD under the direction of Gordon Elliott Fogg and funded by the Institute of Seaweed Research. There she studied the growth of marine phytoplankton, graduating in 1957.

In 1956, she was appointed ‘Algologist’ at Port Erin Marine Laboratory, University of Liverpool, on the Isle of Man, where she conducted research, without being required to teach, for the next 16 years. While she was there, she met her colleague and future husband Norman Jones and they went on to have two children, Martin and Bidda. Jo was officially employed by Port Erin Marine Laboratory for 44 years until 1991. (The laboratory was permanently closed in 2006.) Despite her retired status, she continued her research and publishing efforts even in her spare time.

== Later years ==
Following her husband's death in 1997, Jo moved to Canberra, Australia, at 70, to be closer to her daughter and family. There, she arranged to become a Visiting Fellow at the Australian National University, and began intertidal monitoring projects, which led to additional scientific papers including Winter favours growth and survival of Ralfsia verrucosa (Phaeophyceae) in high intertidal rockpools in southeast Australia (2008).

Kain peacefully died at 87 on 21 July 2017 of cancer, still wearing her reading glasses.

== Selected publications ==
- Kain JM (1964) A study on the ecology of Laminaria hyperborea (Gunn.) Fosl. In: Davy de Ville, A., Feldmann J (eds) Proceedings of the fourth International Seaweed Symposium: Biarritz, September 1961, Pergamon, Oxford pp 207-214.
- Kain JM (1964) Aspects of the biology of Laminaria hyperborea. III. Survival and growth of gametophytes. J Mar Biol Ass UK 44:415– 433
- Jones NS, Kain JM (1964) The numbers of O-Group plaice in Port Erin Bay in August 1963 observed by diving. Rep Mar Biol Stn Port Erin 76:19–25
- Kain JM (1965) Aspects of the biology of Laminaria hyperborea. IV. Growth of early sporophytes. J Mar Biol Ass UK 45:129–143
- Jones NS, Kain JM, Stride AH (1965) The movement of sand waves on Warts Bank, Isle of Man. Mar Geol 3:329–336
- Kain JM (2008) Winter favours growth and survival of Ralfsia verrucosa (Phaeophyceae) in high intertidal rockpools in southeast Australia. Phycologia 47:498–509
