= M. S. Balakrishnan =

Indian phycologist

Madura S. Balakrishnan (1917–1990) was a mycologist and phycologist from Madras, India during the Madras Presidency. He served various government positions and worked for some time at the University of Pune (now known as Savitribai Phule Pune University). He was the student of Indian phycologist M.O.P. Iyengar.

== Early life and career ==
Balakrishnan was born on 10 February 1917 in Madras in then British India. His parents were both active in national freedom efforts. His father gave up a prestigious government position to join the civil disobedience movement. His mother was a Gandhian and an eminent writer in Tamil.

Balakrishnan was educated in Madras and received his B.Sc. with honors in botany from Presidency College. He received his M.Sc. from Botany Laboratory, Chepauk, Madras under Indian phycologist M.O.P. Iyengar.

After this, he joined the Department of Information and Broadcasting from the Government of India as a sub-editor. Following this he took up a research fellowship at the Agricultural College and Research Institute, Coimbatore. He then worked as a phycologist in the Government of Madras, and after a short time moved to the central Rice Research Institute, Cuttack, Orissa where he worked as a research assistant in mycology. From 1950 to 1953, he worked as a mycologist under S.R. Bose researching fungal antibiotics at the R.G. Kar Medical College, Calcutta.

In 1957 to 1959, Balakrishnan earned his Ph.D. under M. O. P. Iyengar. His research focused on controlling algae in Mithalpur Salt Works and was sponsored by Tata Industries

He then worked as a Reader in Botany at the University of Poona.

In 1965 and 1966, he was a National Science Foundation research associate in Marine Cryptogamic Botany at Friday Harbour Lab, University of Washington, where he researched the Pacific Cryptonemiaceae.

On his way back to India in 1966, he spent a fortnight in Japan. He worked for a week in the Cryptogamic section of the National Science Museum Tokyo with Dr. Mitsuo Chihara, and for another week at Sapporo in the Okamura Algal Herbarium of the Hokkaido University and with Professor Yukio Yamada, doyen of Japanese Algologists.

== University of Pune ==
Balakrishnan was a lecturer in Botany at the University of Poona. His research centered on marine red algae which resulted in the creation of a new family, the Corynomorphaceae and taxonomic revisions in the orders Cryptonemiales and Gigartinales.

Based on his comparative studies of Indian and U.S. Pacific Cryptonemiaceae, Balakrishnan established two new genera—Isabbottia and Norrisia. He researched broad aspects of freshwater and marine algae, including systematics, life histories, morphology, cytology and ecology.

Some examples of his contributions are life history studies in Batrachospermum, studies on taxonomy and reproduction in Solieriaceae, cytology and life history of Indian Scytosiphonaceae, limnology of some lakes in India, algae in relation to water pollution, and air borne algae. In 1970, he became the Head of the Department of Botany at Poona University and in 1972 he was appointed as a full professor of Botany. In this capacity he continued until his retirement in 1978.

In 1978, he was at Shivaji University Kolhapur continuing his teaching and research activities. From 1980 to 1986 he was in the Centre of Advanced Studies in Botany at the Madras University working on Indian marine algae.

== Research ==
Balakrishnan was actively involved in research on algae and fungi until he died in 1990. At Coimbatore he compiled a monograph on the diseases caused phythiaceous fungi. At the Central Rice Research Institute he focused his attention on the diseases of rice. He was also one of the contributors to the Tamil Encyclopedia along with Professor Sadasivan.

Balakrishnan's algal work was largely influenced by M.O.P. Iyengar, who emphasized the need for information on morphology, cytology and the life history of Indian algae. All of the published work of Balakrishnan on the red algae were aimed at this objective, which resulted in a series of papers on forms ranging from Liagora to Polysiphonia. His most outstanding efforts went into the study of the Cryptonmeiales and the Gigartinales. He established the family Corynomorphaceae and created two new genera, Isabottia and Norrisia. His work on Batrachospermum and Sirodotia of the Batrachospermales, established the existence of a heteromorphic alternation of generations, the sporophyte being filamentous and bearing a highly modified type of sporangium involving the formation of elimination cells during a modified meiotic process.

His intensive taxonomic studies on the red algae culminated in the preparation of a book on the Indian Rhodophyta along with his close associates T.V. Desikachary and V. Krishnamurthy.

The marine brown algae also received his attention. Cytological studies on the Ectocarpaceae had indicated the need for cytotaxonomical revision of this vexing complex. Studies on the cytology and life history of the Indian Scytosiphonaceae (Colpomenia, Iyengaria, Rosenvingea) had shown interesting developmental patterns. Intensive studies on the freshwater algae had also been done simultaneously, oogamy, a rather rare phenomenon was described in a new species of Golenkiniopsis from Pashan, and a new species of Sphaerelloopsis was reported from Khandala. The interesting life history of Pyrobotrys (Uva) which had an independent alternating zygotic phase (Chlorobrachis) was elucidated by him. His studies on the reproduction of the various algae was extended to Pleodiorina calipyriformis, Gloeochaete and Physocitium. Later two additional species of Sphaerellopsis from Khandala had also been reported. He studied the Chlorococcales of Poona. Studies were also done on Nelliecarteria, Gloeodendron, the rare filamentous alga Chaetonemopsis, cytology of Rhizoclonium and Cladophora algae of polluted waters, aerial algae, algae associated with Bryophytes etc.

He participated in the ICAR/UNESCO, International Symposium in Algology in 1960 held in Delhi. While in the United States, he participated in the Fifth International Seaweed Symposium at Halifax, Canada in August 1965. He also attended the Annual Convention of the American Institute of Biological Sciences at Champaign Urbana, Illinois in August 1965, the triple session of the American Association for the Advancement of Science at Berkeley, California in December 1965, and January 1966.

Balakrishnan was also a member of many professional societies including: the Indian Phytopathological Society, the Phycological Society of India, the International Phycological Society, the Indian Association of Biological Sciences, the Phycological Society of America, the International Society of Plant Morphologists, the Indian Botanical Society and the Mycological Society of India.

He was on the editorial board for the publication Algal Monograph by the Indian Council of Agricultural Research. He served on the editorial board of the journals, Phykos and Journal of Science and Technology. He was a member of the Expert Committee of the Central Salt and Marine Chemical Research Institute, Bhavnagar.

The standard author abbreviation M.S.Balakr. is used to indicate this person as the author when citing a botanical name.
