= Grantham Grammar School =

There are two grammar schools in Grantham, Lincolnshire:

- The King's School, Grantham
- Kesteven and Grantham Girls' School
