= Lena Tracy Hanks =

Botanist (1879-1944)

Lena Tracy Hanks (1879–1944), sometimes credited as Lenda Tracy Hanks, was an American algologist and botanist who specialized in studying North American algae and flora. She is credited with the discovery of Geranium laxum. She worked at the museum of the New York Botanical Garden with John Kunkel Small. The standard author abbreviation Hanks is used to indicate this person as the author when citing a botanical name.

== Works ==
- Hanks, Lenda Tracy; Small, John Kunkel (1907). "Geraniaceae". North American Flora. 25 (Part 1): 3–24. ISSN 0078-1312.
