= Kathleen Drew-Baker =

English phycologist (1901–1957)

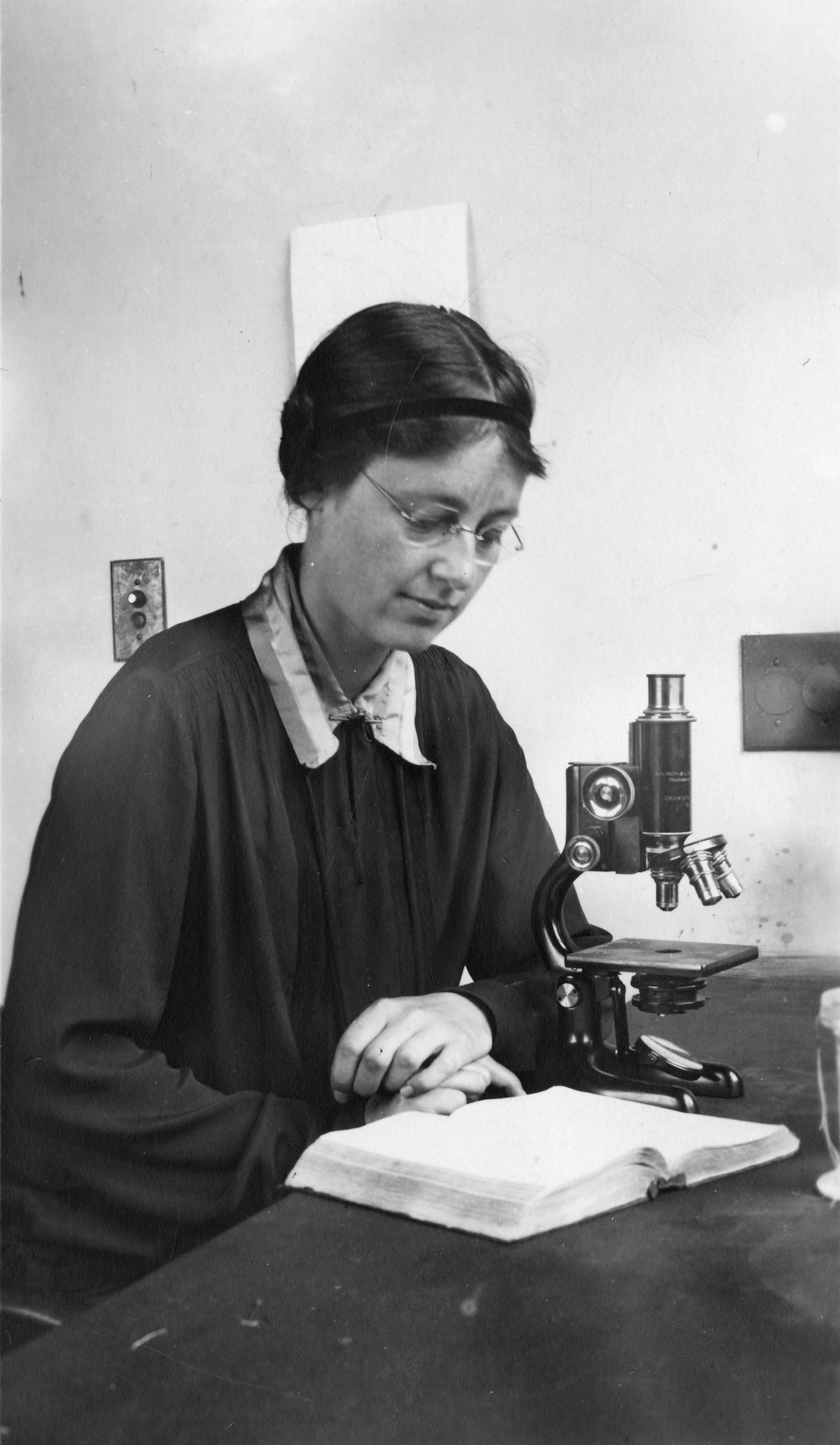
- Born: Kathleen Mary Drew; 6 November 1901; Leigh, Lancashire, England
- Died: 14 September 1957 (aged 55); Manchester, England
- Other names: Mother of the Sea, Mother of Everyone
- Education: University of Manchester (BS, 1922), (MSc, 1923), (DSc, 1939)
- Known for: Study of Porphyra umbilicalis
- Spouse: Henry Wright-Baker (m. 1928)
- Children: 2
- Scientific career
- Fields: Phycology
- Workplaces: University of Manchester; University of California, Berkeley
- Author abbrev. (botany): K.M.Drew

Kathleen Mary Drew-Baker (née Drew; 6 November 1901 – 14 September 1957) was an English phycologist. She was known for her research on the edible seaweed Porphyra umbilicalis, which led to a breakthrough for the commercial cultivation of nori.

Kathleen Drew-Baker's scientific legacy is revered in Japan, where she has been nicknamed Mother of the Sea. Her work is celebrated each year on 14 April. A monument to her was erected in 1963 at Sumiyoshi Shrine in Uto, Kumamoto, Japan.

== Early life and education ==
Born Kathleen Mary Drew on 6 November 1901 in Leigh, Lancashire, she was the elder daughter of Walter and Augusta Caroline Drew. She attended Bishop Wordsworth's School, Salisbury, and won a County Major Scholarship to study botany at the University of Manchester. She graduated in 1922 with first class honours (one of the first two women to achieve a first class honours degree there) and subsequently studied for an MSc, graduating in 1923. In 1939 she was awarded a DSc from the same institution.

== Academic career ==
Drew-Baker spent most of her academic life at the cryptogamic botany department of the University of Manchester, serving as a lecturer in botany and researcher from 1922 to 1957. In 1925, she spent two years working at the University of California, Berkeley, after winning a newly created Commonwealth Fund Fellowship, travelling as far as Hawaii to collect botanical samples. Kathleen married Manchester academic Henry Wright-Baker in 1928, which resulted in her dismissal by the university which had a policy of not employing married women. Drew-Baker was awarded an Ashburne Hall Research Scholarship in 1922, and in later years joined the staff of the Manchester Department of Botany and awarded a research fellowship in the university's Laboratory of Cryptogamic Botany.

=== Research supporting commercial seaweed cultivation ===
Although Drew-Baker never travelled to Japan, her academic research made a lasting contribution to the development of commercial nori production in the country. Drew-Baker studied the life cycle of the red algae Porphyra umbilicalis and in an academic paper published in Nature in 1949, Drew-Baker detailed her research showing that the microscopic Conchocelis — hitherto thought of as an independent alga — was the diploid stage of the organism of which Porphyra is the macroscopic, haploid stage. Her critical discovery was that at the microscopic conchocelis stage, bivalves and bivalve shells provided an essential host environment for the development of the red algae.

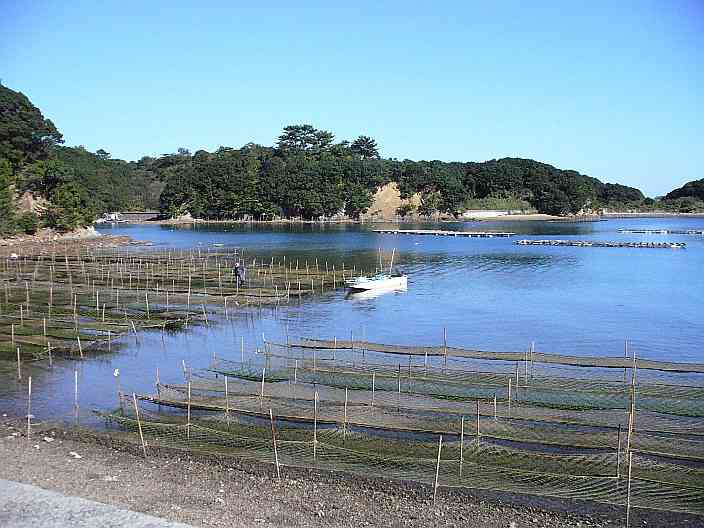
Nori cultivation Mie Prefecture, Japan

Drew-Baker's investigations were soon read and replicated by the Japanese phycologist Sokichi Segawa, who applied Drew-Baker's findings to the Japanese nori, widely known for its use in sushi and other staples of Japanese cuisine. Although nori had been commercially harvested in Japan since the 17th century, it had always suffered from unpredictable harvests and had been particularly prone to damage from typhoons and pollution in coastal waters. By 1963, Fusao Ota and other Japanese marine biologists had developed artificial seeding techniques, building on her work. This in turn increased production and led to a significant increase in production in the Japanese seaweed industry.

Between 1924 and 1947 Drew-Baker published 47 academic papers mainly concerned with red algae. Her book A revision of the genera Chantransia, Rhodochorton, and Acrochaetium with descriptions of the marine species of Rhodochorton (Naeg.) gen. emend. on the Pacific Coast of North America was published by the University of California Press, Berkeley, in 1928.

=== Founding the British Phycological Society ===
Drew-Baker was a co-founder of the British Phycological Society in 1952 with her friend and fellow phycologist Margaret T. Martin and its first elected president.

== Personal life ==
She married Professor Henry Wright-Baker of the Manchester College of Science and Technology in 1928, and they had two children, John Rendle and K. Frances Biggs. She was a member of the Society of Friends.

== Death ==
Drew-Baker died on 14 September 1957, at the age of 54. A memorial service was held for her at the Friends' Meeting House in Manchester.

== Legacy ==
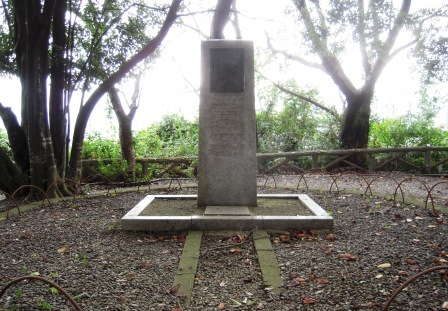
Drew-Baker's monument in Sumiyoshi Nature Park, Uto

In honour of her contributions to Japanese aquaculture and in saving commercial production of nori, she is titled “Mother of Seaweed Farming” (Japanese: 海苔養殖の母) in Japan. Since 1953, the “Drew Festival” (Japanese: ドリュー祭) is celebrated every 14 April at Sumiyoshi Shrine in the city of Uto, Kumamoto, where a monument to her was erected in the shrine’s adjacent nature park above the nori fields of the Ariake Sea.
