= Margery Knight =

British algologist and botanical artist (1889-1973)

- Born: 1889
- Died: 1973 (aged 83–84); Isle of Man, UK
- Known for: algal taxonomy; university teacher
- Scientific career
- Workplaces: University of Liverpool
- Notable students: Mary Parke; Elsie May Burrows; Helen Blackler

Margery Knight (1889–1973) was an algologist, artist and lecturer at the Port Erin Marine Biological Station, University of Liverpool.

== Career ==
Knight was a lecturer in botany at University of Liverpool from 1912 until she retired in 1954. She was based at the university's Port Erin Marine Biological Station on the Isle of Man.

Her research focused on the chromosome numbers and life histories of algae. The book Manx algae; an algal survey of the south end of the Isle of Man that she published with Mary Parke in 1931 became a standard reference.

Knight was the doctoral supervisor of Mary Parke, Elsie May Burrows and Helen Blackler.

She was supportive of students, going as far as to provide finance to them from her own personal resources. On her 80th birthday ex-students and colleagues presented her with a tribute of an album of pressed seaweeds and messages.

== Publications ==
Her publications included:

- Manx algae; an algal survey of the south end of the Isle of Man by Margery Knight and Mary Parke, 1931, University of Liverpool Press.
- Knight, Margery (1924) XVII. Studies in the Ectocarpaceae. I. The life-history and cytology of Pylaiella litoralis, Kjellm. Earth and Environmental Science Transactions of the Royal Society of Edinburgh 53 (2) 343–360
- Knight, Margery (1930) XV. Studies in the Ectocarpaceae. II: the life-history and cytology of Ectocarpus siliculosus, Dillw. Earth and Environmental Science Transactions of the Royal Society of Edinburgh 56 (2) 307–332
- Margery Knight and Mary Parke (1950) A biological study of Fucus vesiculosus and F. serratus. Journal of the Marine Biological Association 29 (2) 439 – 515

== Personal life ==
Her companion was Rose McKenna. In 1936 Knight was in a car accident that resulted in the loss of one of her legs. In retirement on the Isle of Man Knight painted landscapes in oil, some of which are in the collection of the University of Liverpool. She died in 1973.
