= Helen Blackler =

British phycologist and museum curator (1902-1981)

(Margaret (Margret) Constance) Helen Blackler
- Born: 29 August 1902; Arnside, Cumbria, England
- Died: 5 November 1981 (aged 79); St Andrews, Scotland
- Education: University of Liverpool
- Scientific career
- Fields: Phycology; Taxonomy
- Workplaces: Liverpool Museum; University of St Andrews
- Thesis: A morphological and cytological study of certain species of Asperococcus (1928)
- Doctoral advisor: Margery Knight

Margaret Constance Helen Blackler (1902–1981) was a British phycologist, botanical collector and museum curator.

== Career ==
Blackler was Assistant Keeper of Botany at Liverpool Museum between 1933 and 1945. She also had some temporary teaching posts at colleges and the universities of Liverpool and Sheffield. In 1947 she moved to an academic post at University of St Andrews. She was a lecturer in botany until 1961 and then promoted to senior lecturer until her retirement in 1968. She continued active laboratory research at the university's Gatty Marine Laboratory until the day before her death.

At Liverpool Museum she curated historic plant specimens that had been added to the herbarium. These included ones from Liverpool Botanical Garden and ferns from India and Ceylon. She was also able to work on some collections of marine algae.

Her research at St Andrews was about marine algae, especially brown algae (Phaeophyceae). She focused on taxonomy and ecology, especially in the genera Colpomenia, Pylaiella and Desmarestia.

She spent 1959 in the United States visiting marine biology laboratories and the University of California, Berkeley, with funding from the American Association of University Women.

She was a member of the founding committee of the British Phycological Society and was made an Honorary Life Member in 1977.

== Publications and specimens identified ==
Blackler's over 39 scientific publications and books include:

- Edited by Michael Stuart Laverack and Margaret Blackler (1974) Fauna and flora of St. Andrews Bay, Scottish Academic Press, distributed by Chatto & Windus
- Knight, M., Blackler, M. C. H. and Parke, M. W. (1935) Notes on the life-cycle of species of Asperococcus. Proc. Trans. Lpool biol. Soc., 48 79–97.
- Blackler, H. (1938) The Herbarium of Thomas Velley (1748–1806). North West Naturalist 13 72–78.
- Blackler, M. C. H. (1939) The Occurrence of Colpomenia sinuosa (Mert.) Derb. Et Sol. in Ireland. Irish Naturalist Journal 7 215.
- Blackler, H. (1940) Mounting Seaweeds for Display Purposes. Museums Journal 40 203.
- Blackler, H. (1945) An Addition to the Algal Flora of Wales, Colpomenia sinuosa. North West Naturalist 17 112.
- Blackler, H. (1945) Winter Heliotrope (Petasites fragrans Presl) in Westmorland. North West Naturalist 17 112.
- Blackler, H. (1948) Colpomenia sinuosa (Mert.) Derb. Et Sol. in Scotland.” Nature 162 1001.
- Blackler, H. (1949) The rediscovery of the type specimen of Microdictyon umbilicatum (Velley) Zan. Kew Bull 4 127–128.
- Blackler, H. (1951) An algal survey of Lough Foyle, North Ireland. Proc. R. Ir. Acad. 54B 97 – 139
- Burrows, E. M., P. S. Dixon, H. Blackler, K. M. Drew-Baker, H. T. Powell, and H. G. Powell. (1957) List of Marine Algae Collected in the District around Dale Fort, Pembrokeshire, September 19–26, 1956. British Phycological Bulletin 5 21–31.
- Blackler, H., and G. Russell (1959) The Autecology and Life-History of Pylaiella littoralis (L.) Kjellm. Proceedings IX International Botanical Congress
- Blackler, H. (1961) Desmarestia dudresnayi Lamouroux in Britain. British Phycological Bulletin 2 87.
- Blackler, H. (1963). Phaeophyta. British Phycological Bulletin 2 239–241.
- Blackler, H. (1977) Harvey's Australian Algae in the Herbarium of Mrs Margaret Gatty in the Department of Botany of the University of St. Andrew's (STA), Scotland. Taxon 26 495–496
- Blackler, H. (1981) Some algal problems with special reference to Colpomenia peregrina and other members of the Scytosiphonaceae. Br. phycol. J 16 133.

She identified at least 38 specimens of marine algae, particularly of the Scytosiphonaceae species Colpomenia peregrina Sauv. that are now held in the Natural History Museum, United Kingdom.

== Personal life ==
Margaret Constance Helen Blackler (usually known as Helen Blackler) was born in Arnside, Lake District, United Kingdom, on 29 August 1902. She attended Merchant Taylors' Girls' School in Crosby, Liverpool, and then the University of Liverpool, graduating in 1926 with a B.Sc. degree. She carried out her doctoral research under the supervision of Margery Knight, thus becoming involved with marine algae, and her Ph.D. was awarded in 1928 for her thesis "A Morphological and Cytological Study of Certain Species of Asperococcus". The following year she took a diploma in education.

She died unexpectedly of a heart-attack at St Andrews on 5 November 1981.
