= Georgina Callaghan =

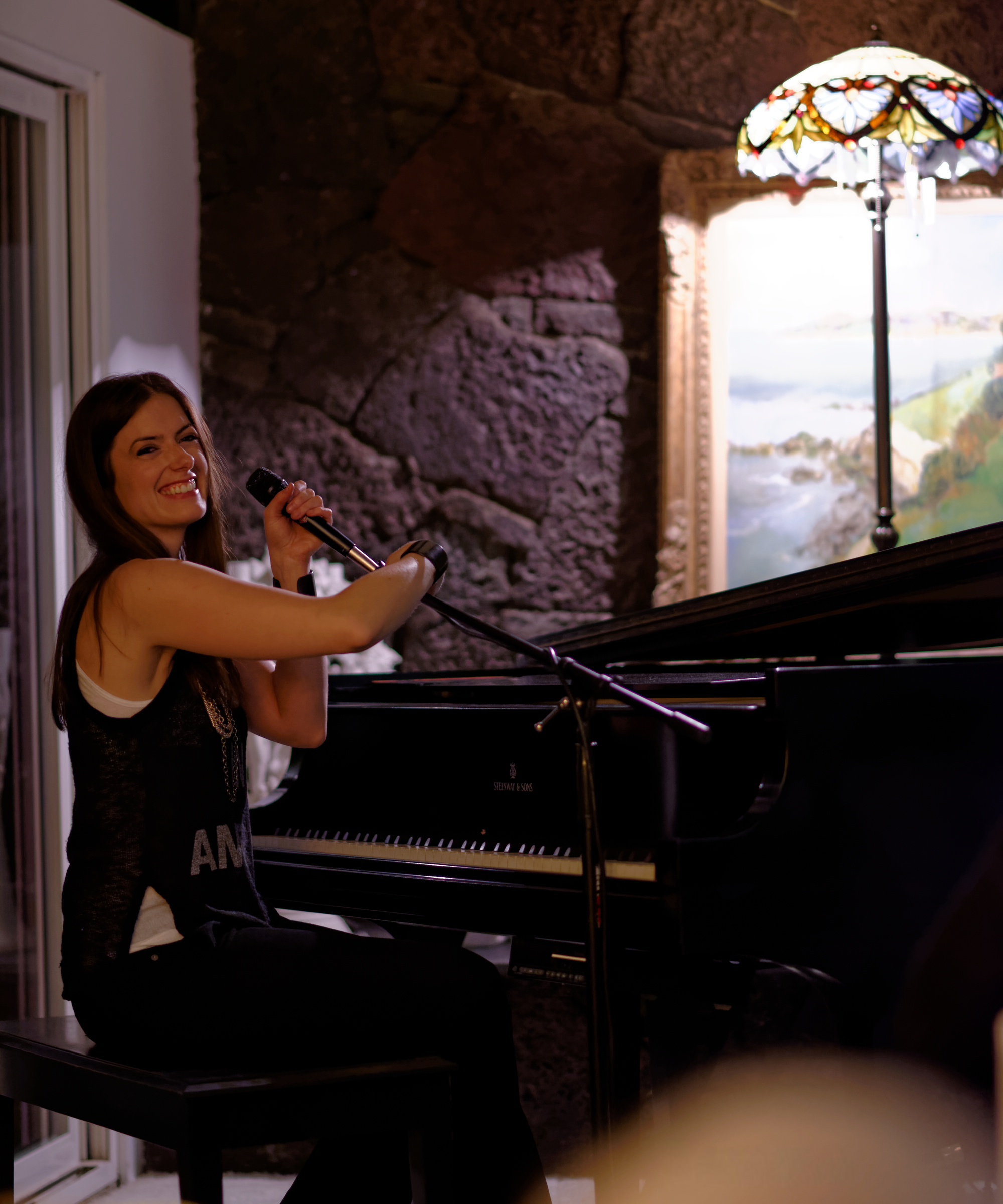

Background information
- Origin: Grantham, Lincolnshire, England
- Genres: Pop
- Occupation: Singer-songwriter
- Instruments: Vocals, acoustic guitar, piano
- Years active: 2005–present
- Label: Green Town Music
- Website: callaghansongs.com

Georgina Callaghan is an English singer and songwriter. She performs under the name Callaghan. She is best known for her 2012 album Life in Full Colour produced by Shawn Mullins.

== Early life ==
Callaghan wrote her first song at the age of 14 and earned a place on BBC TV show Get Your Act Together, hosted by Irish singer Ronan Keating.

She grew up in Allington, Lincolnshire, and played the flute and piano. At Kesteven and Grantham Girls' School she gained 10 GCSEs, with 8 at grade A, in the K class in 1999.

== Career ==
Callaghan has worked with many musicians and producers including Grammy Award-winning writer John Peppard (1998, Best Country Collaboration with Vocals for "In Another's Eyes") and producer Peter Lawlor who formed the band Stiltskin.

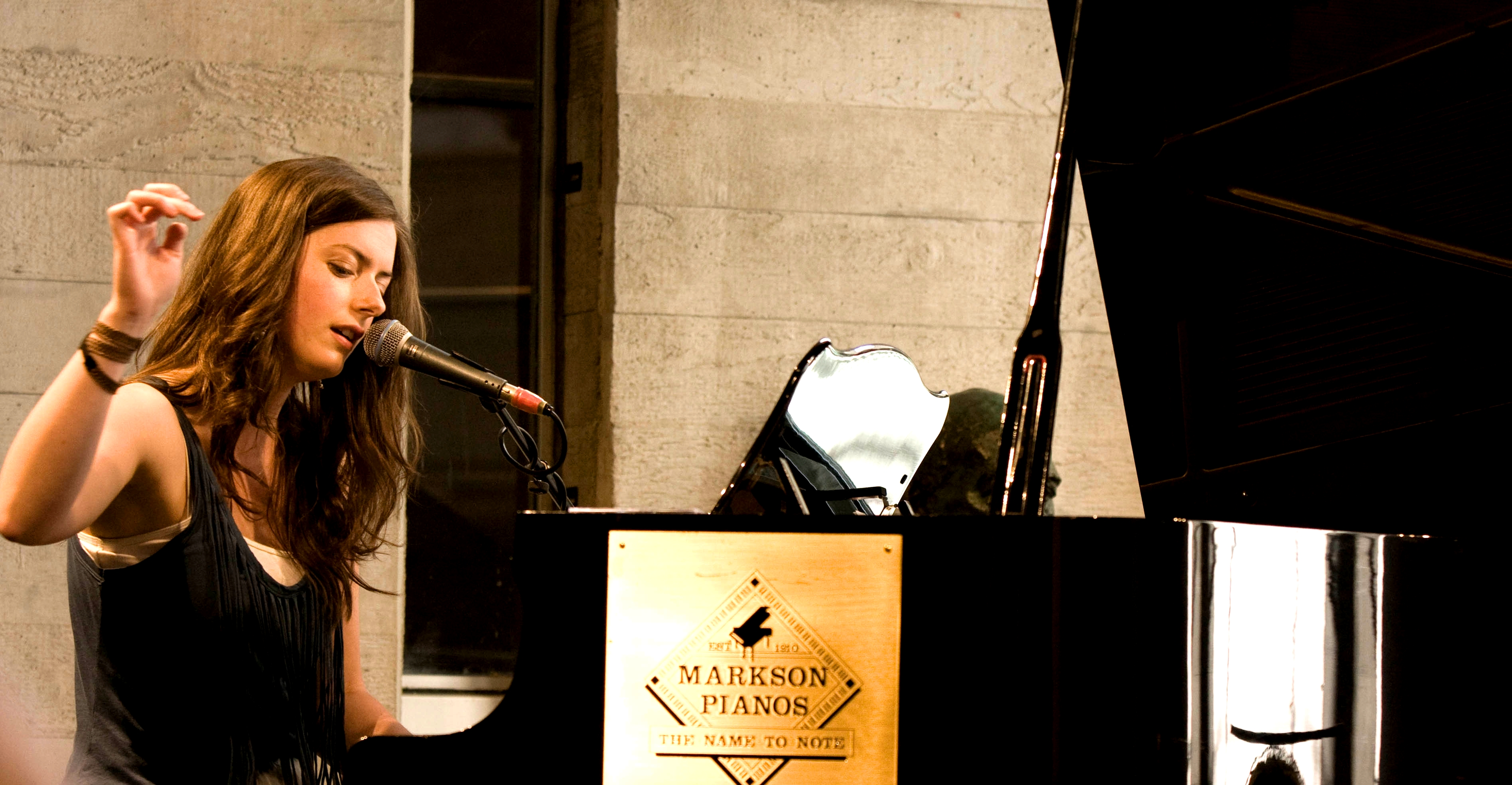
Callaghan performing at The National Theatre London 2009

In 2008, Callaghan self-released a single "Look Around". Doing all of the PR and radio plugging herself, Callaghan achieved airplay on numerous BBC radio stations, extensive local and national press coverage as well as a performance on Sky TV. All proceeds from the sale of the single went to music charity Live Music Now.

In July 2009, Callaghan travelled to Georgia, USA to record with US artist Shawn Mullins. The first single from the collaboration "Smile" was played and endorsed on the Bob Harris Country Show on BBC Radio 2.

Callaghan's album Life in Full Colour was completed in 2011 and initially made available as pre-release limited edition copies to fans through her website, and at live shows.

The album was released in 2012 to strong reviews:

"A 12-track set infused with folk, pop, rock and country influences and, above all, immediate hooks" – Billboard.com

"Life In Full Colour by Callaghan proves that this Brit has been listening to her Joni Mitchell, Bonnie Raitt and Sheryl Crow records. ...Girl can write. Girl can sing. Girl can play piano. Girl has captured my heart. Callaghan, oh Callaghan, sing me back home" – Aquarian Weekly

"The world needs more singer songwriters like Callaghan. In a time where mediocrity is seen as brilliant, Callaghan truly shines through as the real deal. Her voice is original and pure, and she is one of the greatest unsigned talents I've ever heard." – Shawn Mullins

After living in Atlanta for a few years she moved to Nashville in 2012 after completing 4 tours opening for Mullins. In June 2013 Billboard Magazine published a four-page article titled House Music which detailed her first show in Boston as part of her Callaghan Across America Tour describing the exposure that house concerts can provide for both independent and established artists. On 22 September 2013 BBC Radio 2 broadcast a recorded live session with Callaghan for the Bob Harris Sunday show as part of his week in Nashville covering the Americana Awards.

== Influences ==
Callaghan's music is a blend of pop/rock/singer-songwriter genres, with influences from great artists including Shawn Mullins, Sarah McLachlan, Johnny Cash and James Taylor. Her voice has been compared to artists including Sarah McLachlan and Alison Krauss.

== Discography ==
=== Albums ===
- Life in Full Colour (2012)
- Callaghan: Live in America (2013)
- A History of Now (2015)
- Callaghan's Acoustic Coffee House (2016)
- Callaghan (2018)
- Callaghan's Acoustic Coffee House - Volume 2 (2020)
- Callaghan's Acoustic Coffee House - Volume 3 (2022)

=== Compilation albums ===
- Callaghan's Crazy Beautiful (Isolation) Life Collection (2020)

=== EPs ===
- Callaghan (2005)
- Road To Elmersville (2006)
- Nothing You Say (2007)
- London To Lawrenceville (2010)
- 40 States and Counting (2013)
- The Other Side (2017)
- The Final Four (2018)
- Skin on Skin (2018)
- Snowflakes - A Winter EP (2019)

=== Singles ===
- "Look Around" (2008)
- "Smile" (2009)
- "Best Year (2015)" (2015)
- "Last Song" (2016)
- "Surrender" (Acoustic) (2017)
- "I Don't Know How To Lose You" (Acoustic) (2017)

== Collaborations ==
- Album Life in Full Colour produced by Shawn Mullins
- "Sweet Surrender" (Life in Full Colour) co-written by Callaghan and Shawn Mullins
- "The Only Thing Real" (Life in Full Colour) co-written by Callaghan and Shawn Mullins
- "Smile", "Look Around" and "The Edge of Love" (EP London To Lawrenceville) produced by Shawn Mullins
- Songs on EP The Final Four produced by Starr Parodi and Jeff Eden Fair
- Album Callaghan produced in collaboration with Starr Parodi, Jeff Eden Fair and Anthony Resta
- Album Callaghan guest vocals by Louis Price, former lead vocalist of the Temptations.

== Quotes ==
- "Having seen her do a showcase earlier this year, I thought she was wonderful" – Bob Harris OBE (BBC Radio 2)
- "One of the best albums of last year, LIFE IN FULL COLOUR, for Callaghan" – Bob Harris OBE (BBC Radio 2).
- "A 12-track set infused with folk, pop, rock and country influences and, above all, immediate hooks" – Billboard
- "Life In Full Colour is joyful listening" – Huffington Post

== See also ==
- Carla Rees, flautist from Allington, professor of low flutes at the Royal Academy of Music from 2021, editor of the journal of the British Flute Society
