= British Phycological Society =

Learned society specialising in phycology

- Formation: 1952
- Legal status: Not-for-profit organisation
- Purpose: Phycology
- Region served: Worldwide
- President: Jessica Adams
- Website: Official Website

The British Phycological Society, founded in 1952, is a learned society based in the United Kingdom promoting the study of algae. Members interests include all aspects of the study of algae, including both natural biodiversity and applied uses. It is the largest learned phycological society in Europe. Its membership is worldwide, although predominantly within the UK.

== Activities ==
The Society currently:

- Holds an annual meeting each January within Britain or Ireland
- The scientific journals European Journal of Phycology and Applied Phycology are published by Taylor & Francis on behalf of the Society
- Publishes the member's magazine The Phycologist
- Provides financial support for research training and annual meeting attendance to members who are student and early career researcher
- Annually awards the Irène Manton Prize for the best student presentation and the BPS Student Poster Prize at the annual meeting
- Gives the Hilda Canter-Lund Award annually for phycological photography (since 2016, open to all)
- Since its founding in 1952 the Society has supported recording and mapping of the marine algae around the British Isles. These are now the Seaweed and Freshwater Algae Recording Site and shared with the NBN Atlas.
- Supports training in identification and survey of both freshwater and marine algae
- Organises and funds annual field courses

The Society is a member of the Federation of European Microbiological Societies.

The Society is registered charity No. 246707 in England and Wales.

== History ==
The society was founded in 1952, following a meeting of phycologists the previous year at University College, Bangor in North Wales. As a result, a group of nine led the formation of the society. These were Kathleen Drew-Baker, Elsie M. Burrows, Sheila Lodge, Elsie Conway, Margaret Trevena Martin, Mary Parke, Helen Blackler, Mr. F. T. Walker, and Harry Powell. Máirin de Valéra from University College, Galway was also at the meeting in Bangor and was involved in the foundation of the new society.

The first official meeting of the Society was in Edinburgh. From the beginning, the Society planned to eventually produce a comprehensive list of the British marine algal flora (also called seaweed). To help with this, the Society's members planned structured records of the algal distributions as well as to add reference specimens to a national herbarium collection. Members were also interest in practical uses of algae and their products from the start of the Society.

The new Society published a scientific journal, British Phycological Bulletin from 1952 until 1968, when it was renamed the British Phycological Journal. In 1993 it underwent another change of name to European Journal of Phycology.

== Presidents ==
Has included:

- 1952 Kathleen Mary Drew-Baker
- 1957 John Lund
- 1961–1962 Gordon E. Fogg
- 1965 - 1967 Elsie Conway
- 1983 - 1984 George Russell
- 1987 to 1988 Joanna M. Kain
- 2017 Gill Malin
- 2019 Graham Underwood
- 2020 Jason Hall-Spencer
- 2021 Jane Lewis
- 2022 Saul Purton
- 2026 Jessica Adams

== Vice-Presidents ==
Has included:

- 1957-1958 Elsie M. Burrows
- 1965 Paulette Gayral and Margaret Trevena Martin
- 1969 Máirin de Valéra
