= Mary Parke =

British biologist

Dr Mary Winifred Parke
- Born: March 23, 1908; Bootle, Liverpool, England
- Died: July 17, 1989 (aged 81); Plymouth, England
- Education: Notre Dame Convent School, University of Liverpool
- Known for: Marine botany, Phycology
- Scientific career
- Fields: Marine Biologist, Phycologist
- Workplaces: Marine Biological Station (Isle of Man), Development Commission and the Ministry of Supply, Marine Biological Association
- Thesis: The Mesogloiaceae and Associated Families (1932)
- Doctoral advisor: Margery Knight

Mary Winifred Parke, FRS, (23 March 1908 – 17 July 1989) was a British marine botanist and Fellow of the Royal Society (1972) specialising in phycology, the study of algae.

== Scientific work ==
Mary Parke contributed a great deal to the study of marine algae, publishing numerous articles on the subject. Her pioneering work on culturing algae in the laboratory may be considered her most significant contribution. She discovered that the flagellate Isochrysis galbana was ideal for feeding oyster larvae; cultures of this species are used for fish farming and in research laboratories throughout the world. Most researchers and fish farmers seeking food for feeding marine animals such as crab larvae or filter feeders such as muscles sought Parke for guidance on the most suitable algae and its subculture during her career.

Parke was also known for her beautiful and accurate drawings of algae using the light microscope, and her renderings of algal structures using the electron microscope set a new standard in the field.

== Biography and professional affiliations ==
Parke was born in Bootle, Liverpool in England on 23 March 1908.

She was awarded the Isaac Roberts Scholarship in Biology while reading Botany at Liverpool University. She graduated in 1929 and was awarded her PhD in 1932, followed by a DSc in 1950.

Parke's first publication, Manx Algae (1931), was written with her PhD supervisor Margery Knight and became a standard reference work on algae. While at the Port Erin Marine Biological Station, Parke conducted research on the commercial rearing and feeding of oyster larvae. This research lead to the description of previously undescribed micro-organisms such as Isochrysis galbana.

From the 1940s Parke led the development of the Plymouth Culture Collection of marine algae and first published the Check-List of Marine Algae in 1953. After the war Parke returned to her work on minute plankton and published seminal papers on flagellate systematics, many in collaboration with Professor Irene Manton of the University of Leeds.

In 1952 Parke was a founding member of the British Phycological Society, edited The British Phycological Bulletin (1967–1967) and was President of the Society from 1959 to 1960. Parke was awarded international honours including Corresponding Membership of the Royal Botanical Society of the Netherlands (1970), Membership of the Norwegian Academy of Science and Letters (1971), and the Fellowship of the Royal Society (1972). In addition she was a Fellow of the Institute of Biology and the Linnean Society and was awarded an honorary Doctor of Science degree by the University of Liverpool in 1986.

Parke retired in 1973 and died in Plymouth in 1989 after a short illness.

== Archives ==
Parke's archive of personal and scientific papers is held by the National Marine Biological Library at the Marine Biological Association in Plymouth.

== Publications ==
- Parke, M. 1953. A preliminary check-list of British marine algae. J. mar. biol. Ass. U.K. 32: 497 – 520.
- Parke, M. 1956. A preliminary check-list of British marine algae. Corrections and additions 1953 – 1955. Phycol Bull. I: no.4 26–31.
- Parke, M. 1957. A preliminary check-list of British marine algae. Corrections and additions. II Phycol Bull. I: no.5, 36 – 37.
- Parke, M. 1959. A preliminary check-list of British marine algae. Corrections and additions. III Phycol Bull. I: no.7, 74 – 78.
- Parke, M. 1961a. Some remarks concerning the class Chrysophyceae. Br. phycol. Bull. II: 47 – 55.
- Parke, M.1961b. Electron microscope observations on scale-bearing Chrysophyceae. Recent Advances in Botany, Section 3, pp. 226–9. University of Toronto Press.
- Parke, M. 1961c. Stages in life-histories of coccolithophorids. Rep. Challenger Soc., 3, No. XIII, p. 30.
- Parke, M. 1966. The genus Pachyspharea (Prasinophyceae).In Some Studies in Marine Science, pp. 555–63. Ed. H. Barnes. London.
- Parke, M. & Adams, I., 1960. The motile (Crystallolithus hyalinus Gaarder & Markali) and non-motile phases in the life history of Coccolithus pelagicus (Wallich) Schiller. J. mar. biol.Ass. UK, Vol. 39, pp. 263–74.
- Parke, M. & Adams, I., 1961. The Pyramimonas-like motile stage Halosphaera viridis Schmitz. Bull. Res. Coun. Israel, Vol. 10D, pp. 94 – 100.
- Parke, M, & Ballantine, D., 1967. A new marine dinoflagellate: Exuviaella mariaelebouriae n.sp. J. mar. biol. Ass. U.K., Vol.36. pp. 643 – 50.
- Parke, M. & Dixon, P.S. 1964. A revised check-list of British, marine algae. J. mar. biol. Ass. UK., Vol.44, pp. 499–542.
- Parke, M. & Dixon, P.S. 1968. Check-list of British marine algae – second revision. Journal of Marine Biological Association United Kingdom 48: pp. 783 – 832.
- Parke, M. & Hartog-Adams, I. den, 1965. Three species of Halosphaera. J. mar. biol. Ass. U.K. Vol.45: 537–57.
- Parke, M., Lunde, J.W.G. & Manton, I., 1962. Observations on the biology and fine structure of the type species of Chrysochromulina (C. parva Lackey) in the English Lake District. Arch. Mikrobiol., Bd. 42, pp. 333–52.
