= Hilda Mabel Canter =

English mycologist, protozoologist, and photographer (1922–2007)

Hilda Canter-Lund
- Born: Hilda Mabel Canter-Lund; 1922; Highbury, London, England
- Died: 15 January 2007 (aged 84–85); Ambleside, Westmorland, England
- Citizenship: United Kingdom
- Education: Camden School for Girls; Bedford College, London; University of London; Queen Mary College
- Occupations: Mycologist; Protozoologist; Photographer
- Spouse: John W. G. Lund (m. 1949)
- Children: 2

Hilda Mabel Canter-Lund (1922 – 15 January 2007) was an English mycologist, protozoologist, and photographer. She worked as a mycologist and then as a senior principal scientific officer at the laboratories of the Freshwater Biological Association. Canter took photographs and several of them were exhibited in multiple publications and published more than 74 papers of which 25 were in collaboration with colleagues. She received a fellowship from the Royal Photographic Society, the Benefactor's Medal from the British Mycological Society (BMS) and was elected an centennial fellow of the BMS. A photographic award in Canter's honour was established by the British Phycological Society.

== Biography ==
Canter was born in 1922 in Highbury, London. She was the daughter of a gas fitter assigned to the Royal Engineers during the First World War, and she was an only child. Canter went to Drayton Park Primary School in London from 1927 to 1933 and then attended Camden School for Girls between 1933 and 1940 before she was evacuated to Grantham when the Second World War was ongoing. She graduated from Bedford College, London with an intermediate Bachelor of Science degree with honours in botany, geography, physics and zoology in 1944 before earning a post-graduate education diploma from the University of London the following year and got Doctor of Philosophy and Doctor of Science degrees on fungi research at Wray Castle supervised by Cecil Terence Ingold from Queen Mary College's Department of Botany in 1948 and 1955 respectively.

She had attended a botany course at Wray Castle on the shores of Windermere in 1943 and observed that much of the phytoplankton that was collected had been infected by fungi. Canter noticed a saprophytic chytrid she was unable to identify and contacted Ingold to send him a sample that he described as Chytriomyces elegans. She thereon began to investigate chytrids and other algae-associated fungi with initial guidance from Ingold. Canter was appointed mycologist for the laboratories of the Freshwater Biological Association (FBA) in 1948. She was employed part-time in an honorary position from 1956 to 1962 so she could look after her family, financed by a grant from the Royal Society allowing her to continue studying at home. Canter was FBA's senior principal scientific officer between 1976 and 1987.

In 1965, Canter received an fellowship from the Royal Photographic Society, and an individual special merit proclamation from the Department of the Civil Service eleven years later. Several of her photographs of algae were exhibited and published in publications such as on the front cover of the Radio Times magazine announcing the David Attenborough television series Life on Earth broadcast on BBC Television from January 1979. Canter published more than 74 papers and 25 of them were in collaboration with her colleagues. She and G. W. Beakes conducted experiments with the Rhizophydium planktonicum parasitic and grew more chytrid species in culture for ultrastructural studies and the results of this experiment were published in Annals of Botany, Mycological Research and other journals from 1979 to 1993.

In 1990, Canter was appointed an honorary research fellow of the FBA, and was awarded the Benefactor's Medal from the British Mycological Society (BMS) a year later. She and John Lund compiled Freshwater Algae: Their Microscopic World Explored in 1995, and the two received the Prescott Award from the Phycological Society of America "for publication of the best book about algae" in 1997. Canter was elected an centennial fellow of the BMS in 1996 and became an honorary member of the FBA.

== Personal life ==
She married the phycologist John W. G. Lund in 1949, and the couple had two children. Canter died from Alzheimer's disease on 15 January 2007 in Ambleside, Westmorland. Her funeral was held at Lancaster & Morecambe Crematorium on 29 January.

== Legacy ==
Canter's husband described her as having "an international reputation for the technical excellence and brilliance of the pictures she took down her microscope and an international reputation in her field of study." The British Phycological Society established the Hilda Canter-Lund Annual Photography Award that awards a monetary prize "for a photograph on a phycological theme that best combines these informative, technical and aesthetic qualities" of either an image taken of a micro- or macroalga, marine, freshwater or terrestrial in her honour. The FBA Archives hold a collection of Canter's personal and scientific correspondence and work-related papers and photographs from the 1930s to the 1980s.
