= John McLean Thompson =

Scottish botanist (1888–1977)

John McLean Thompson FRSE FLS (1888–1977) was a 20th-century Scottish botanist.

== Life ==
He was born in Rothesay on the isle of Bute in western Scotland on 22 July 1888, the son of Hugh Thompson. He was educated at Rothesay Academy then studied Science at Glasgow University, graduating MA in 1908 and BSc in 1911. In 1914 he began lecturing in Botany at Glasgow University.

From 1913 to 1926 he corresponded with the botanist Frederick Orpen Bower.

In the First World War he was attached to various military hospitals as a protozoologist studying infected wounds.

In 1917 Thompson was elected a Fellow of the Royal Society of Edinburgh. His proposers were Frederick Orpen Bower, Sir John Graham Kerr, Thomas Hastie Bryce and John Walter Gregory. He won that society's Neill Prize for the period 1921 to 1923.

In 1918 he returned to Glasgow as a lecturer in Plant Morphology. In 1921 he was created Professor of Botany at Liverpool University and remained in that role until retirement in 1952. Among his doctoral students was the botanist and phycologist Elsie Conway.

The University of Louvain awarded Thompson an honorary doctorate (DSc) in 1948.

He died on 17 April 1977, aged 89.

== Publications ==
- The Anatomy and Affinity of Deparia Moorei Hook (1915)
- Studies in Advancing Sterility (1929)
- The Theory of Scitaminean Flowering (1933)
- On the Floral Morphology of Elettaria Cardomomum Maton (1936)

== Family ==
In 1920 he married Dr Simone Denil.
