= Valerie Gibson =

British particle physicist

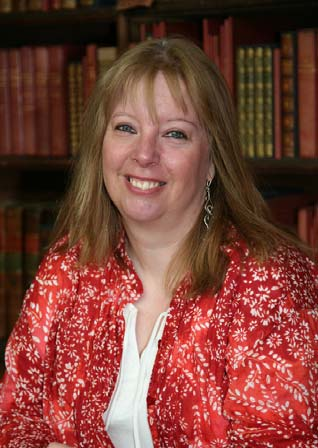
- Education: University of Sheffield, University of Oxford
- Known for: LHCb experiment, CP violation
- Scientific career
- Fields: High Energy Physics
- Workplaces: University of Cambridge, CERN
- Website: https://www.phy.cam.ac.uk/directory/gibsonv

Notes
- Occupation: Professor of High Energy Physics

Valerie Gibson OBE, also known as Val Gibson, is an Emeritus Professor of Physics and former Head of the High Energy Physics group of the Cavendish Laboratory at the University of Cambridge.

== Education ==
Gibson completed a bachelor's degree in Physics at the University of Sheffield in 1983. She achieved a DPhil in experimental particle physics in 1986 from The Queen's College, Oxford.

== Career ==
In 1987, she became a fellow in the Experimental Physics Division at CERN. She joined the Cavendish Laboratory in 1989 on a five-year SERC Advanced Fellowship. In 1989, she also received a Stokes Senior Research Fellowship at Pembroke College. She was appointed as University Lecturer and Fellow of Trinity College in 1994. She was awarded a Royal Society Leverhulme Trust Fellowship in 2007. Gibson was appointed Professor in 2009, appointed Head of the High Energy Physics Group in the Cavendish Laboratory from 2013 until her retirement in 2023.

She undertook her PhD research on the EMC Effect at the European Muon Collaboration experiment at CERN. As a CERN Fellow, she investigated Direct CP violation and CPT conservation in the Kaon system on the NA31 experiment. She has worked on the LHCb experiment since the first beam of particles were injected into the Large Hadron Collider in 2008. Gibson has overall responsibility for data acquisition from the ring imaging Cherenkov detectors. Gibson was the UK spokesperson for the LHCb experiment between 2004 and 2008 and was Chair of the LHCb Collaboration Board from 2016 until 2020. She led the University of Cambridge's LHCb team until 2022. Gibson was part of the discovery of CP violation in the Kaon system.

== Public engagement ==
Gibson is a keen science communicator, interested in taking science to a wider range of audiences. She regularly discusses particle physics discoveries in the media. She developed the card game Hunt the Higgs and has acted as an adviser for exhibitions at the Science Museum. She is a patron of the Gravity Fields Festival. Alongside her research group, Gibson exhibited at the Royal Society Summer Science Exhibition.

Gibson has spent her career championing women in science. She believes it is her duty "to encourage younger women in their careers and say ‘it is possible’". She has been part of the University of Cambridge's Athena SWAN and Project Juno committees. In 2014, the University of Cambridge were awarded the first gold Athena SWAN award. She won the WISE Campaign Leader Award in 2013. She is chair of the Institute of Physics Juno panel. In 2016 she launched a three-day residential program for young women interested in physics at the Cavendish Laboratory. In 2016 she won a Royal Society Athena Prize for increasing gender diversity in mathematics, having been nominated by the Institute of Physics. She was a keynote speaker at the 2018 Conference for Undergraduate Women in Physics.

Gibson was appointed Officer of the Order of the British Empire (OBE) in the 2021 New Year Honours for services to science, women in science and public engagement and was awarded an Institute of Physics Honorary Fellowship in 2024.
