= Sheina Marshall =

Scottish marine biologist

Sheina Macalister Marshall OBE FRSE FRS
- Born: 20 April 1896; Rothesay, Scotland
- Died: 7 April 1977 (aged 80); Millport, Scotland
- Education: University of Glasgow BSc (1919), DSc (1934)
- Known for: The study of marine productivity, animal and plant plankton in particular the copepod Calanus
- Awards: FRSE (1949); FRS (1961); OBE (1966); Neill Prize
- Scientific career
- Fields: marine biology
- Workplaces: Marine Biological Station

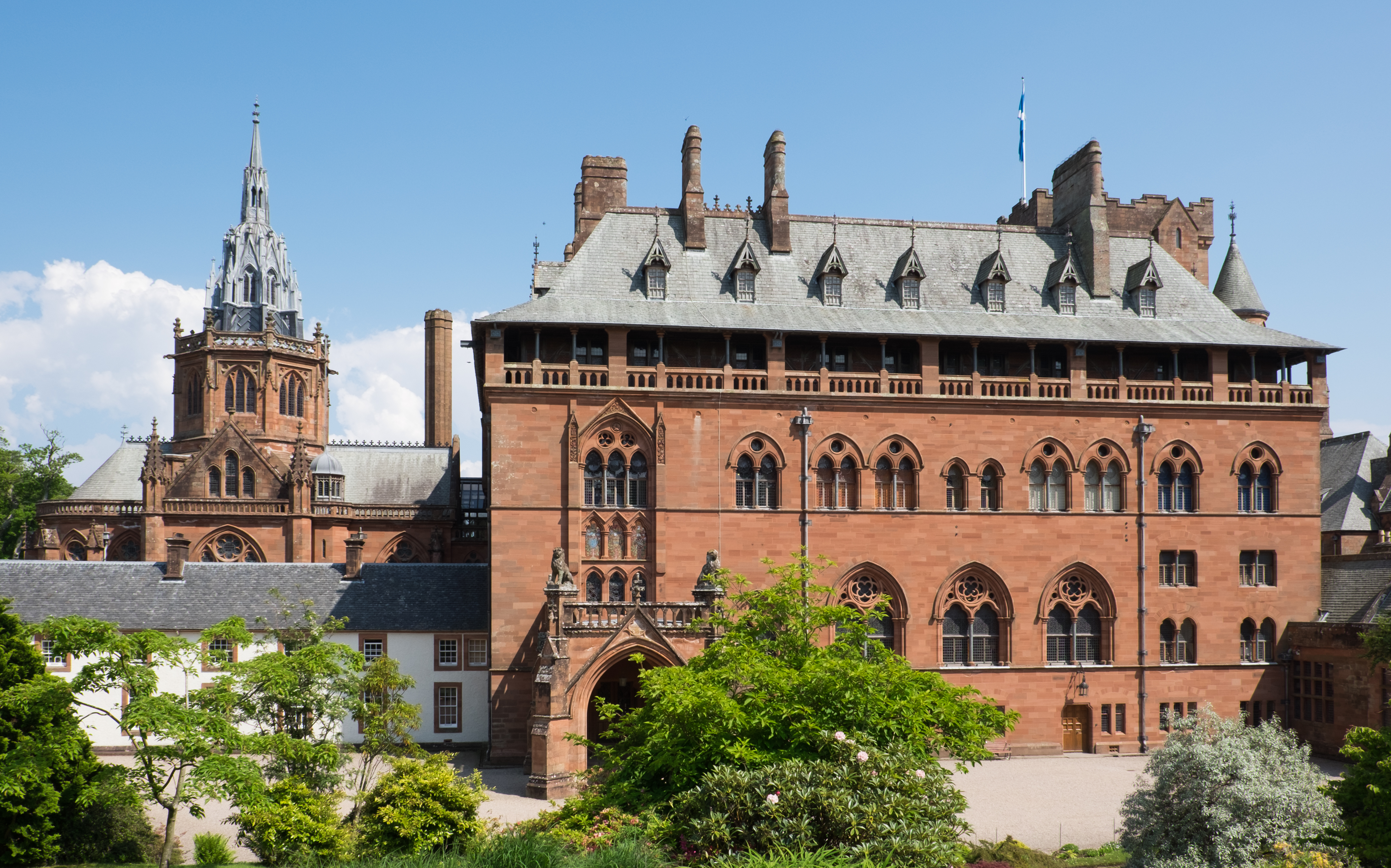
Mount Stuart House

Sheina Macalister Marshall OBE FRSE FRS (20 April 1896 – 7 April 1977) was a Scottish marine biologist who studied plant and animal plankton. She was an authority on the copepod Calanus. She worked at the Marine Biological Station at Millport, Cumbrae in Scotland from 1922-1964.

== Early life and education ==
Sheina Marshall was born on 20 April 1896 in Rothesay, Scotland, the second daughter of three, to Jean Colville (née Binnie, born 1861/2) and John Nairn Marshall (born 1860) of Mount Stuart House. Marshall's father, a general practitioner, had an interest in natural history and encouraged his daughters' interest in the subject.

Initially Marshall was educated by governesses, later attending Rothesay Academy and St Margaret's School in Polmont. In 1914 she entered the University of Glasgow to study for a BSc in Zoology, botany and physiology. After an interruption in her studies due to World War I she graduated with honours in 1919. She held a Carnegie Fellowship at the University from 1920 to 1922 and worked with the professor of zoology, John Graham Kerr.

== Career ==
In 1922, she took a job at the Marine Biological Station in Millport on the Isle of Cumbrae where she worked for the rest of her life. From 1928 to 1929 Marshall travelled with Frederick Stratten Russell and J. S. Colman on the Great Barrier Reef Expedition led by Maurice Yonge.

Marshall studied the marine food chain, in particular copepods. This became her life's work. She collaborated for almost 40 years with the chemist, Andrew Picken Orr. Together they studied the plankton and phytoplankton in and around the river Clyde and Loch Striven. They authored several books and many papers together.

In 1934 Marshall received a DSc from the University of Glasgow.

In the 1940s she worked with Lillie Newton and Elsie Conway as well as Orr to develop seaweeds from around the United Kingdom as a source of agar for pharmaceutical purposes since imports from traditional sources in the Middle East were prevented by the Second World War. She also examined the effect of fertilizers on marine productivity at Loch Craiglin.

She retired as Deputy Director of the Station in 1964 (having been appointed to this post on the death of Orr, the previous post-holder, in 1962). She continued research there as an Honorary Fellow.

Between 1970 and 1971 she attended the Scripps Institution of Oceanography in the United States and she visited the Villefranche-sur-Mer Marine Station in France 1974. In 1987 she published a history of the Marine Station.

== Personal life and death ==
Outside her work she enjoyed walking, foreign travel, needlework, poetry and music. She was considered hospitable, dignified and generous.

She died of a heart attack at Lady Margaret Hospital, Millport, Cumbrae on 7 April 1977. She bequeathed her house at Millport to the Directors of Millport.

Her sisters were Margaret Marshall OBE, Matron at Edinburgh's Royal Infirmary and Dorothy Nairn Marshal MBE, a museum curator on Bute.

== Honours ==
In 1949 Marshall, along with Ethel Dobbie Currie, became the first women to be elected Fellows of the Royal Society of Edinburgh. Her proposers were Sir John Graham Kerr, James Ritchie, Sir Maurice Yonge, Charles Wynford Parsons and Andrew Orr. She was awarded the society's Neill Prize in 1971. In 1963 she was elected a Fellow of the Royal Society of London.

She was awarded the Order of the British Empire in 1966. In 1977 she received an honorary degree from the University of Uppsala, Sweden.

The teaching building at Scottish Association for Marine Science at Dunbeg was named in her honour in 2010.

== Works ==
Marshall wrote over 60 scientific articles.

- 'The Food of Calanus finmarchicus during 1923', Journal of the Marine Biological Association of the UK, Vol. 12 (1924), 473-79.
- On the Biology of Calanus finmarchicus. VIII., 1955 (with Andrew Picken Orr)
- The Biology of a Marine Copepod, 1955 (with Andrew Picken Orr)
- 'Respiration and Feeding in Copepods', Advances in Marine Biology, 1973
- 'An account of the Marine Station at Millport', started before her death this book was edited by J. A. Allen and published in 1987
