= Life in Full Colour =

Studio album by Callaghan
- Released: 1 May 2012
- Recorded: Creekside Station Studio Lawrenceville GA, Down in Deep Studio Atlanta GA, Last House Studio Athens GA
- Genres: Singer-Songwriter, Folk, Pop
- Length: 47:59
- Label: Green Town Music

Life in Full Colour is the first official studio release for English artist Callaghan. The album was recorded from August 2010 to 2011 and released 1 May 2012 on Green Town Music and was produced by Shawn Mullins.

== Background ==
Life in Full Colour was recorded at 3 separate studios and consists of twelve tracks. They are all original compositions written or co-written by Callaghan. The tracks Sweet Surrender and The Only Thing Real were co-written with Shawn Mullins. It Was Meant To Be was co-written with Grammy Nominated songwriter John Peppard who co-wrote In Another's Eyes (with Garth Brooks and Bobby Wood) the Grammy winning song for Garth Brooks and Trisha Yearwood. It was a Number 1 song in the USA and was included on the album Sevens by Garth Brooks.

As a long-time Shawn Mullins fan, Callaghan contacted the Grammy nominated singer-songwriter in 2009 through MySpace, and he agreed to a rare collaboration. An initial recording trip to Atlanta, Georgia, USA in July 2009 produced three songs, Smile, Look Around and Edge of Love and in so doing Shawn became something of a protégé to her. The tracks were then promoted on both sides of the Atlantic. The song Smile received critical acclaim from Bob Harris on BBC Radio 2 when it was released to radio on a promotional 3-track EP.

This prompted her life-changing decision to move to the USA in 2010 to finish the album and tour with Mullins. Callaghan left her London lodgings and headed for the American South. This experience was the inspiration for the album's opening summer track and first single from the album, Best Year. Callaghan now calls Atlanta, and the United States, home. Work started on the album in August 2010 and it was completed in 2011 with pre-release limited edition copies made available. The record was tracked in and around Atlanta with Mullins who both produced and played on the album. The 12 songs represent Callaghan's eclectic and dynamic style, combining shades of folk, country, rock and pop into a seamless fusion of feeling and melody.

Says Callaghan of the experience: When I got on that plane from London to Atlanta, I didn't know what to expect, but the welcome and the reaction to my music has been amazing. I knew that Shawn Mullins was the right producer, and working in the studio with such a meticulous and gifted artist has been a real education for me as a musician and a songwriter. The songs on Life in Full Colour reflect the moments all of us experience in our lives; from the joy of being in love to the mess of falling out of love, from the loneliness of bereavement to the happiness of meeting the right person at the right time. "Best Year" is about the story that brought me here and a hope and belief that the best is yet to come.

Says Mullins of the collaboration: "Callaghan is a truly amazing artist. It’s been a long time since I’ve heard a voice as strong and as true as hers. It just shines. Working with her in the studio was incredible; I felt an immediate connection to her music. She’s a remarkably strong pop melodist – her sense of melody is timeless and there is a classic quality to her songs."

== Track listing ==
| No. | Title | Writer(s) | Length |
|---|---|---|---|
| 1. | "Best Year" | Callaghan, Tom Stephens | 4:07 |
| 2. | "To Be Loved By You" | Callaghan, Tom Stephens | 3:21 |
| 3. | "Nothing You Say" | Callaghan, Luke Juby | 4:24 |
| 4. | "It Was Meant to Be" | Callaghan, John Peppard, Rick Mitra | 3:52 |
| 5. | "Close My Eyes" | Callaghan | 4:11 |
| 6. | "Sweet Surrender" | Callaghan, Shawn Mullins | 4:37 |
| 7. | "Look Around" | Callaghan | 4:12 |
| 8. | "The Only Thing Real" | Callaghan, Shawn Mullins | 3:04 |
| 9. | "Get Me Through Tonight" | Callaghan | 3:44 |
| 10. | "Smile" | Callaghan | 3:53 |
| 11. | "The Edge of Love" | Callaghan | 5:08 |
| 12. | "If Only for Tonight" | Callaghan, Luke Juby | 3:26 |

== Personnel ==
Musicians

- Callaghan – lead vocals, background vocals, piano
- Shawn Mullins – acoustic guitar, string arrangements
- Davis Causey – electric guitar
- Gerry Hansen – drums, percussion
- Tom 'Panda' Ryan – bass, glockenspiel
- Patrick Blanchard – bass
- Martin Kearns – piano, keyboards, string arrangements
- Luke Juby – piano, keyboards, string arrangements
- Andy Carlson – mandolin, violin

Technical personnel

- Shawn Mullins – producer
- Gerry Hansen – engineering and mixing
- Keaton Andrew – photography
- Jolene Postley-Eyre – styling
- Stylorouge – design

== Quotes ==
- "Having seen her do a showcase earlier this year, I thought she was wonderful" – Bob Harris OBE (BBC Radio 2).
- "One of the best albums of last year, LIFE IN FULL COLOUR, for Callaghan" – Bob Harris OBE (BBC Radio 2).
