= Gordon Elliott Fogg =

British botanist (1919–2005)

- Born: 26 April 1919
- Died: 30 January 2005 (aged 85)
- Awards: Fellow of the Royal Society, CBE
- Scientific career
- Institutions: University College, London, University College of North Wales
- Doctoral students: Joanna M. Kain

Gordon Elliott Fogg CBE FRS (26 April 1919 – 30 January 2005) was a British biologist.

== Early life ==
He was born in Langar, Nottinghamshire and educated at Dulwich College and Queen Mary College, London.

== Career ==
During WW2 he assisted in a national survey of seaweed resources and researched algae used to make water-soluble silk for parachutes to drop mines at sea. He also worked on pest control for Pest Control Ltd at Harston.

In 1945 he was appointed Assistant Lecturer, then Lecturer, and then Reader in Botany at University College, London (until 1960). During his time at University College he supervised Joanna M. Kain who obtained her doctorate in 1957. He was then made Professor of Botany at Westfield College, London (1960–1971) and then Professor of Marine Biology, University College of North Wales (1971–1985). He specialised in cyanobacteria, algal cultures and phytoplankton. Professor Fogg wrote important foundational texts on the latter two : The Metabolism of Algae (Methuen, 1954) and Algal Cultures and Phytoplankton Ecology (University of Wisconsin Press, 1966). From 1953 - 1960 he was a co-editor and author of the successful popular science series from Penguin New Biology.

He was President of the British Phycological Society (1961–1962), Chairman of the British Antarctic Survey Scientific Advisory Committee (1971–1964), Chairman of the Freshwater Biological Association Council (1974–1985), Chairman of the Scientific Advisory Panel, Royal Botanic Gardens, Kew (1974–1982) and President of the Institute of Biology (1976–1977). He also sat on the Council of NERC (Natural Environment Research Council) and on the Royal Commission on Environmental Pollution.

He and Beryl Llechid-Jones were married in 1945. He died in Llandegfan, Anglesey in 2005.

== Honours and awards ==
- He was elected a Fellow of the Royal Society in Mar, 1965
- He delivered the Leeuwenhoek Lecture to the Royal Society in 1968.
- He was awarded CBE in 1983.
- Fogg Highland in Antarctica is named after him.
- The G.E. Fogg Building at Queen Mary University of London is named in his honor.

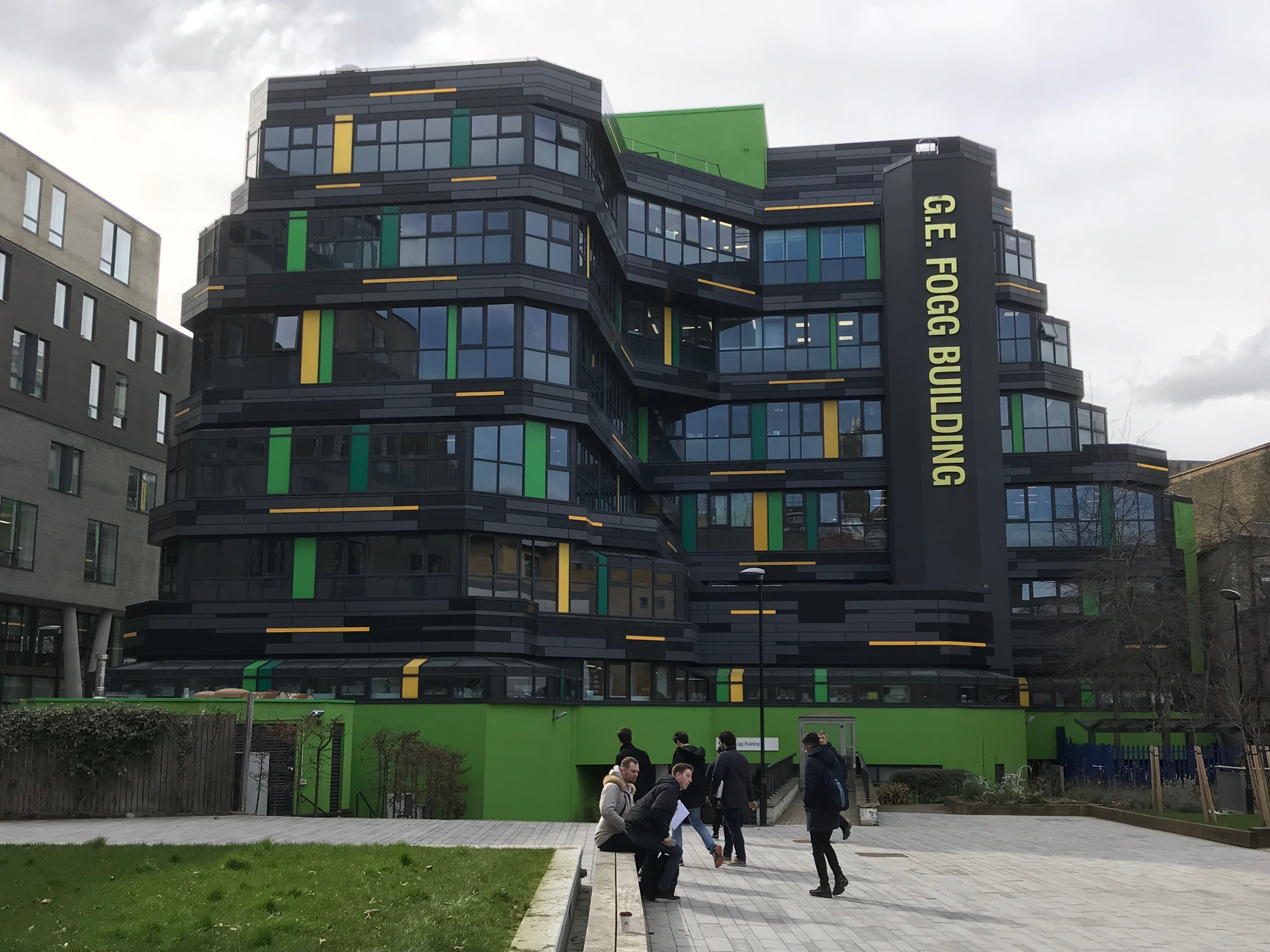
Fogg Building at Queen Mary University of London
