= Elsie M. Burrows =

British botanist

- Born: Elsie May Pearson; 14 September 1913
- Died: 26 August 1986 (aged 72)
- Other names: Bunny
- Education: doctorate
- Alma mater: University of London
- Occupation: Botanist, phycologist, university teacher, science writer, botanical collector, scientific collector
- Employer: University of Liverpool (1936–1973)

Elsie May Burrows (née Pearson; 14 September 1913 – 26 August 1986) was an English botanist who made significant contributions to British postwar phycology. Her primary area of research was macroalgal ecology, focusing particularly on Fucus, a genus of brown algae, and Chlorophyta, a division of the green algae.

== Career ==
Burrows assumed a post as research assistant in the Department of Botany at the University of Liverpool in 1936, where she spent her career until she retired in 1973. This was hindered by the misogyny of her supervisor, John McLean Thompson. However, she was finally promoted to senior lecturer and chaired the Department of Botany in 1967 to 1968.

She received her Ph.D. as an external student of the University of London in 1948 for work on the biology of Ascophyllum nodosum. Her subsequent research, often in collaboration with staff based at the Port Erin Marine Biological Station on the Isle of Man, included studies on laboratory cultivation of marine algae, including Fucus and Laminaria species, thus opening the way for experiments under controlled conditions. She also undertook fieldwork, and her studies published in 1950 with Sheila Lodge on the interrelationships between marine algae and animals was ahead of the field.

A founder member of the British Phycological Society, she served as the organization's vice president from 1957 to 1958. She continued to be involved with the society, as a member of its managing committee, flora committee and its meetings until her death in 1986.

In 1951, she began collecting data for her monograph on the Chlorophyta, as part of Seaweeds of the British Isles. The manuscript was completed shortly before her death and published posthumously in 1991. A number of specimens collected and identified by her for the Seaweed Mapping Scheme remain in the herbarium at the Ulster Museum.

She also influenced phycology through training a number of doctoral students who went on to have significant careers, including Anne Archer, Tony Chapman, Robin South,, and Trevor Norton.

== Publications ==
Burrows publications include:

- Burrows, E.M. 1947. J. Ecol. 35: 186.
- Burrows, E.M. 1948 A biological study of Ascophyllum nodosum.. Proc. Challenger Soc., 20(2).
- Burrows, E.M. and S.M. Lodge 1950 Note on the interrelationships of Patella, Balanus and Fucus on a semi-exposed coast. Ann. Rep. mar. biol Stat. Pt Erin, 62: 30-34.
- Burrows, E.M. and S.M. Lodge 1951 Autecology and the species problem in Fucus. J. mar. biol. Ass. U.K. 30: 161-176.
- Burrows, E.M. and S.M. Lodge 1953 Culture of Fucus hybrids. Nature, Lond., 172: 1009-1010.
- Burrows, E.M. 1958. Sublittoral algal population in Port Erin Bay, Isle of Man. Journal of the Marine Biological Association of the United Kingdom. 37: 187–703.
- Burrows, E.M. 1959. Growth form and environment in Enteromorpha. Bot. J. Linn. Soc. 56: 204–206.
- Burrows, E.M. 1964. A preliminary list of the marine algae of the coast of Dorset. Br. Phycol. Bull. 2: 364–368.
- Burrows, E.M. 1991. Seaweeds of the British Isles. Volume 2. Chlorophyta. Natural History Museum Publications. ISBN 0-565-00981-8
- Burrows, E.M. and Lodge, S.M. 1949. Notes on the inter-relationships of Patella, Balanus and Fucus, on a semi-exposed coast. Rep. Mar. Biol. Sta. Pt. Erin. 62: 30–34.
- Burrows, E.M. and Lodge, S. 1951. Autecology and the species problem in Fucus. J. Mar. Biol. Ass. U.K. 30: 161–176.
- Burrows, E.M., Conway, E., Lodge, S.M. and Powell, H.T. 1954. The raising of intertidal algal zones on Fair Isle. J. Ecol. 42: 283.
- Burrows, E.M., Dixon, P.S., Blackler, H., Drew-Baker, K.M., Powell, H.T., and Powell, H.G. 1957. List of marine algae collected in the district around Dale Fort, Pembrokeshire, September 19–26, 1956. Brit Phy. Bull. 5: 21–31.

Her collection of around 1400 specimens is now held within the herbarium at Liverpool World Museum.

== Personal life and education ==
Burrows was born in Leicester on 14 September 1913. She studied at the University College in Leicester and was awarded an external B. Sc degree by the University of London in 1935. She married a man who worked as an industrial chemist in 1936 and was present when he died in a climbing accident in 1952. After retiring she lived in Dorset, despite ill-health, until her death on 26 August 1986.
