= Agricultural College and Research Institute, Killikulam =

College of Tamil Nadu Agricultural University, Killikulam, India

Coordinates: 8°42′12.2″N 77°51′34.7″E

V.O. Chidambaranar Agricultural College and Research Institute, killikulam
- Killikulam Campus
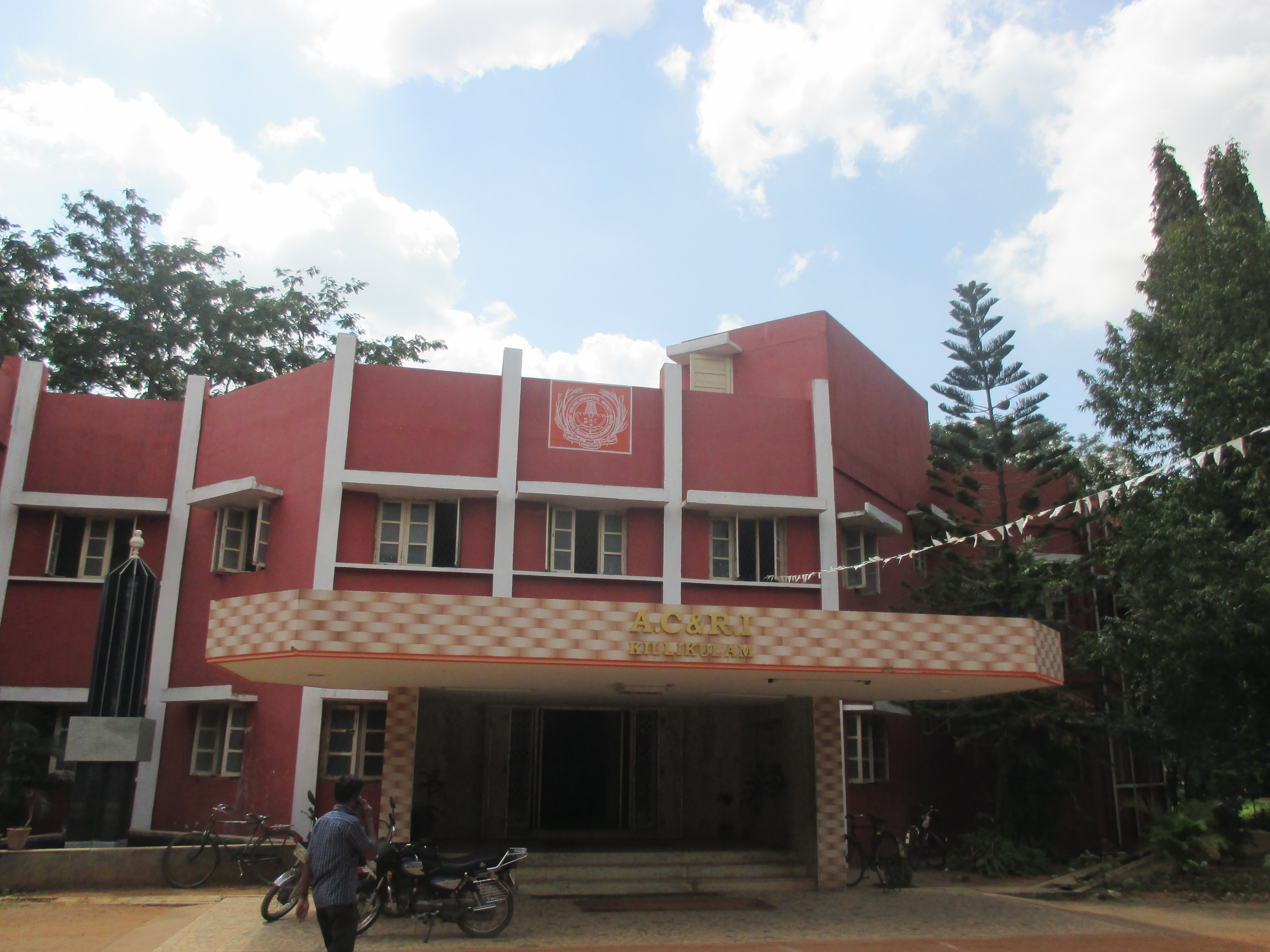
- Motto: உழுவோம் உழைப்போம் உயர்வோம்
- Type: Public
- Established: 1984 - 1985
- Affiliations: Tamil Nadu Agricultural University
- Location: Tuticorin, Tamil Nadu, India
- Website: www.tnau.ac.in/kkm/a.html

The V.O. Chidambaranar Agricultural College and Research Institute, Killikulam (VOC AC & RI, Killikulam), formerly known as Agricultural College and Research Institute, Killikulam (AC & RI, Killikulam) is the third constituent Agricultural college of Tamil Nadu Agricultural University located in Killikulam, Vallanadu, Tuticorin.

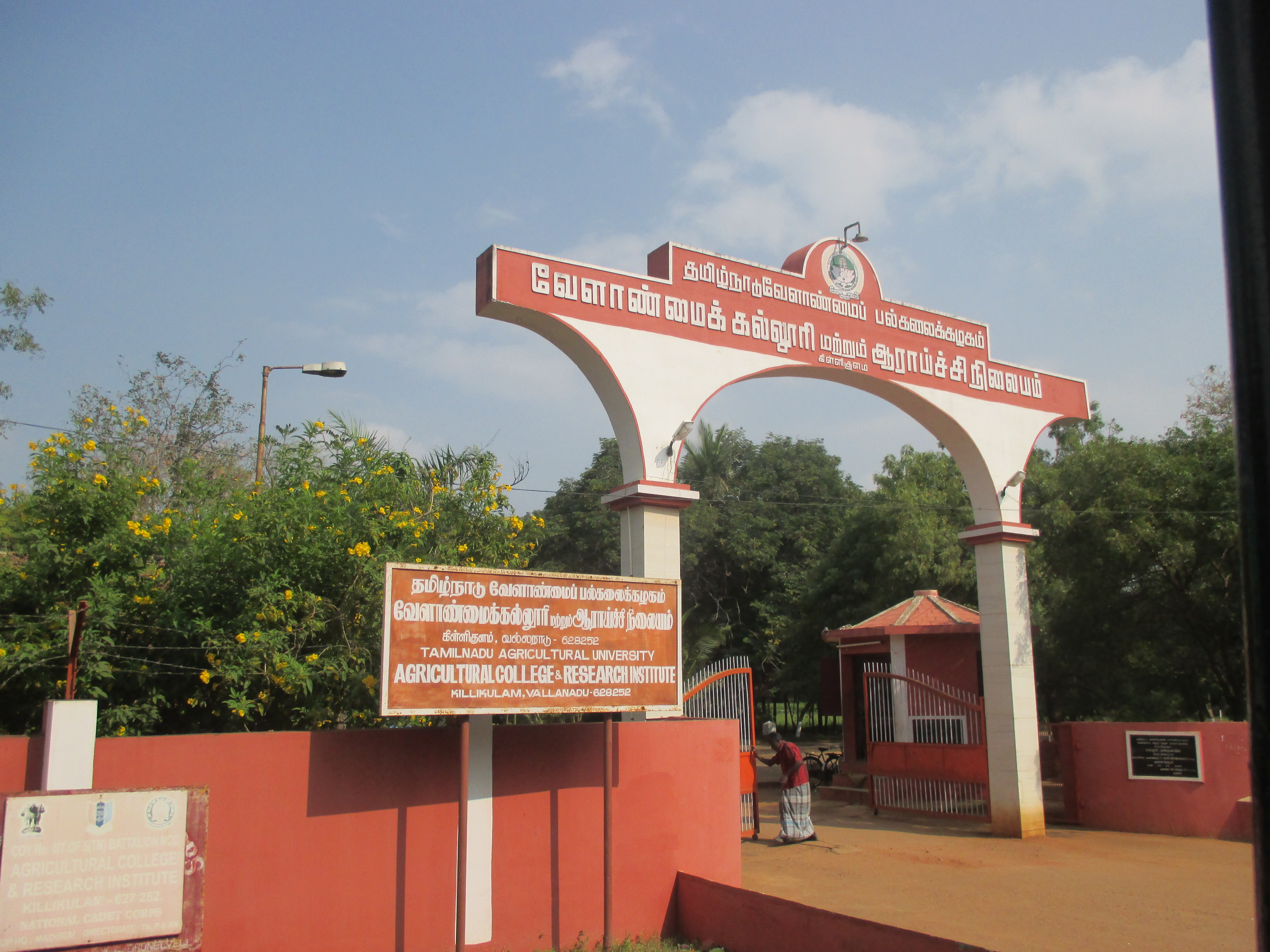
The main entrance of V.O. Chidambaranar Agricultural College and Research institute, Killikulam

== History ==
The College was established in 1984 – 85 as the third constituent college of Tamil Nadu Agricultural University. It was then upgraded as Agricultural College and Research Institute in 1989 and as Post-graduate institute in 1990. The college became a co-education campus in 1990-91.The institute has secured the Best college award during 2002, 2005 and 2009 in TNAU. It was renamed after freedom fighter V.O. Chidambaranar in August 2023. The then Tamil Nadu Chief Minister M.K. Stalin announced the renaming during his Independence Day address on August 15, 2023.

== Mandate ==
This institute covers three main aspects,

- Education
- Research
- Extension

== Academics ==
This college offers one UG degree and PG degree in seven disciples

- UG : B.Sc.(Hons.) Agriculture
- PG : M.Sc Agriculture

== Departments ==
This institute has ten departments. They are

- Department of Agronomy
- Department of Agricultural Entomology
- Department of Horticulture
- Department of Genetics and Plant Breeding
- Department of Plant Pathology
- Department of Soil Science and Agricultural Chemistry
- Department of Agricultural Extension and Communication
- Department of Agricultural Economics
- Department of Agricultural Engineering
- Department of Crop Physiology and Biochemistry

== Geography ==
The campus and its farm is geographically located in 8°46 N latitude and 77°42 E longitude and at an altitude of 40 m above MSL. The mean annual rainfall of the farm is 736.7 mm which is being received in 40 rainy days. The campus is situated near the foot hills of the Vallanadu Black buck Sanctuary. It covers the area of about 476.61 hectares. In this vast area the institute has Watershed development area and a tank called killikulam tank. The farm area has been allocated to various departments for research and Seed production.

== Facilities ==
This institute is equipped with laboratory for all its ten departments.Also the campus is equipped with Library, Computer center, Gym, Auditorium, Playground and Examination hall with online examination facility.

== EDII-Killikulam Agribusiness Incubation Forum ==
EDII- Killikulam Agribusiness Incubation Forum is an Incubation located at Agricultural College and Research Institute, Killikulam. The incubation center’s main focus is to promote the innovative products of Start-ups, which cater the most disruptive problems in the agricultural sector towards sustainable development.

== Research Stations ==
VOC AC & RI, Killikulam has two research stations within its campus which are sanctioned from G.O. Ms. No. 168 from the Agriculture and Farmers Welfare Department. They are

- Banana Research Station, Killikulam.
- Palmyrah Research Station, Killikulam.
