= Charles Wynford Parsons =

British zoologist

Charles Wyndford Parsons FRSE (1901–1950) was a 20th-century British zoologist.

== Life ==
He was born in Swansea on 22 July 1901. He was educated at Bristol Grammar School then studied Zoology at Cambridge University graduating MA in 1924. He then began lecturing in Zoology at Glasgow University.

In 1933, he was elected a Fellow of the Royal Society of Edinburgh. His proposers were Sir John Graham Kerr, Robert Staig, James Chumley, and John Walton.

He died suddenly on 26 August 1950 aged only 49.
