= Phycology =

Branch of biology concerned with the study of algae

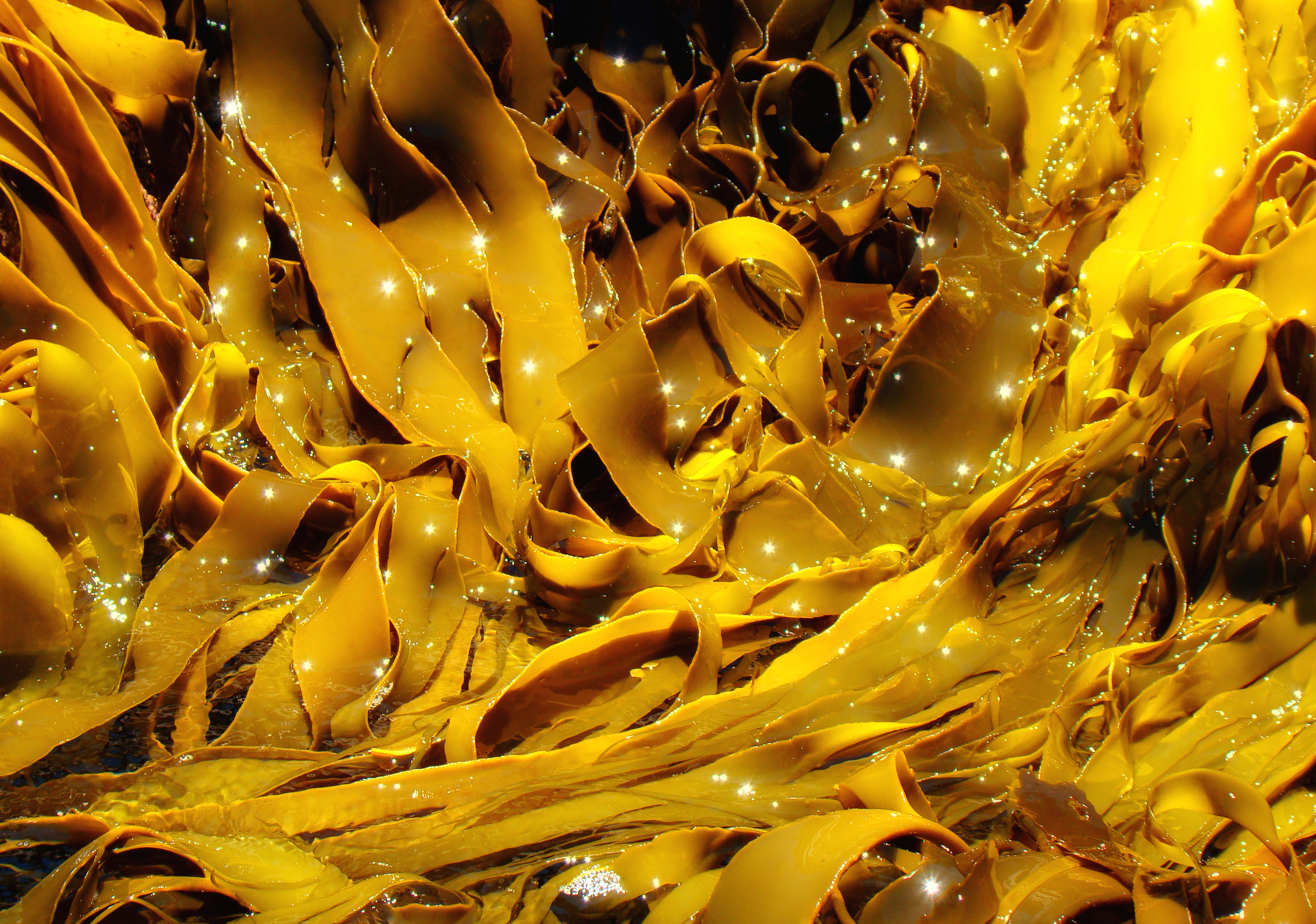
Kelp in Hazards Bay, Freycinet National Park, Tasmania, Australia

Phycology (from Ancient Greek φῦκος (phûkos) 'seaweed' and -λογία (-logía) 'study of') is the scientific study of algae. Also known as algology, phycology is a branch of life science.

Algae are important as primary producers in aquatic ecosystems. Most algae are eukaryotic, photosynthetic organisms that live in a wet environment. They are distinguished from the higher plants by a lack of true roots, stems or leaves. They do not produce flowers. Many species are single-celled and microscopic (including phytoplankton and other microalgae); many others are multicellular to one degree or another, some of these growing to large size (for example, seaweeds such as kelp and Sargassum).

A number of microscopic algae also occur as symbionts in lichens.

Phycologists typically focus on either freshwater or ocean algae, and further within those areas, either diatoms or soft algae.

== History of phycology ==
While both the ancient Greeks and Romans knew of algae, and the ancient Chinese even cultivated certain varieties as food, the scientific study of algae began in the late 18th century with the description and naming of Fucus maximus (now Ecklonia maxima) in 1757 by Pehr Osbeck. This was followed by the descriptive work of scholars such as Dawson Turner and Carl Adolph Agardh, but it was not until later in the 19th century that efforts were made by J.V. Lamouroux and William Henry Harvey to create significant groupings within the algae. Harvey has been called "the father of modern phycology" in part for his division of the algae into four major divisions based upon their pigmentation.

It was in the late 19th and early 20th century, that phycology became a recognized field of its own. Botanists such as Friedrich Traugott Kützing continued the descriptive work. In Japan, beginning in 1889, Kintarô Okamura not only provided detailed descriptions of Japanese coastal algae, he also provided comprehensive analysis of their distribution. Although R. K. Greville published his Algae Britannicae as early as 1830, it was not until 1902 with the publication of A Catalogue of the British Marine Algae by Edward Arthur Lionel Batters that the systematic correlation of records, extensive distribution mapping and the development of identification keys began in earnest. In 1899–1900, Anna Weber-Van Bosse, a Dutch Phycologist travelled on the Siboga expedition and later in 1904, published The Corallinaceae of the Siboga-expedition.

As early as 1803 Jean Pierre Étienne Vaucher had published on the isogamy (sexual conjugation) in the algae, but it was in the early 20th century that reproduction and development began to be extensively studied. The 1935 and 1945 comprehensive volumes of Felix Eugen Fritsch consolidated what was then known about the morphology and reproduction of the algae. This was followed in the 1950s by the development of area checklists, led by Mary Parke with her 1931 Manx Algae and followed in 1953 by her "A preliminary check-list of British marine algae" Although Lily Newton's 1931 Handbook provided the first identification key for the algae of the British Isles, it was the 1960s before the development of such keys became routine. The 1980s with the new emphasis on ecology saw increased study of algal communities, and the place of algae in larger plant communities, and provided an additional tool for explaining geographical variation.

The continent with the richest diversity of seaweeds is Australia, which has 2,000 species.

In 2023, private phycological research funding had reached nearly 1 billion USD showing the great interest in private-sector development for algae-based technology solutions. In the years 2014-2023, the EU invested approximately 600 million EUR into various phycological research interests. The United States regularly commits research funding for phycological studies particularly as it pertains to the management of Harmful Algae Blooms through NOAA and other agencies.

== Notable phycologists ==
- Isabella Abbott (1919–2010)
- Carl Adolph Agardh (1785–1859)
- Jacob Georg Agardh (1813–1901)
- M. S. Balakrishnan (1917–1990)
- Elsie M. Burrows (1913–1986)
- Margaret Constance Helen Blackler (1902–1981)
- Elsie Conway (1902–1992), President of the British Phycological Society 1965–1967.
- E. Yale Dawson (1918–1966)
- Giovanni Battista de Toni (1864–1924)
- Kathleen Mary Drew-Baker (1901–1957)
- Sylvia Alice Earle (1935– )
- Nathaniel Lyon Gardner (1864–1937)
- Robert Kaye Greville (1794–1866)
- Michael D. Guiry (1949– )
- Lena Tracy Hanks (1879–1944)
- M. O. P. Iyengar (1886–1986)
- Eifion Jones (1925–2004)
- Vasudeva Krishnamurthy (1921–2014)
- Friedrich Traugott Kützing (1807–1893)
- Marie Lemoine (1887–1984)
- Diane S. Littler (1945– )
- Hans Christian Lyngbye (1782–1837)
- Carola Ivena Meikle (1900–1970)
- Irene Manton (1904–1988)
- Valerie May (1916–2007)
- Carl Nägeli (1817–1891)
- Lily Newton (1893–1981)
- Friedrich Oltmanns (1860–1945)
- William J. Oswald (1919–2005)
- Mary Parke (1908–1989)
- Franz Josef Ruprecht (1814–1870)
- William Albert Setchell (1864–1943)
- Paul Silva (1922–2014)
- Gilbert Morgan Smith (1885–1959)
- John Stackhouse (1742–1819)
- William Randolph Taylor (1895–1990)
- Vittore Benedetto Antonio Trevisan de Saint-Léon (1818–1897)
- Gavino Trono, (1931–) Filipino marine biologist noted for research on seaweeds
- Máirin de Valéra (1912–1984)
- Anna Weber-van Bosse (1852–1942)
- George Stephen West (1876–1919)
- William West (1848–1914)
- William West Jr (1875–1901)
- Carl Ludwig Willdenow (1765–1812)

== See also ==
- Algaculture – Aquaculture involving the farming of algae
- Algae fuel – Use of algae as a source of energy-rich oils
- History of phycology – History of the scientific study of algae
- Paleophycology – Study and identification of fossil algae
- Phycological Society of America – Professional society for the advancement the study of algae
