= Robert Seymour Conway =

British classical philologist (1864–1933)

Robert Seymour Conway FBA
- Conway, c. 1921
- Born: 20 September 1864; Stoke Newington, England
- Died: 28 September 1933 (aged 69)
- Relatives: Katharine Glasier (sister)
- Awards: Chancellor's Gold Medal

Academic background
- Education: Gonville and Caius College (University of Cambridge)

Robert Seymour Conway FBA (20 September 1864 – 28 September 1933) was a British classical scholar and comparative philologist. Born in Stoke Newington, he was the elder brother of Katharine St John Conway. He was educated at City of London School and Gonville and Caius College, Cambridge, where he graduated with firsts in parts I and II of the classics tripos and won the Chancellor's Medal for English Verse. He was Hulme Professor of Latin Literature, at Victoria University, Manchester, from 1903 until his retirement in 1929.

In 1929 he stood for parliament at the General Election in the constituency of the Combined English Universities for the Liberal Party, finishing in third place.

General Election 1929: Combined English Universities (2 seats)
Party	Candidate	FPv%	Count	
Party	Candidate	FPv%	1	2
Unionist	Martin Conway	26.8	2,679	4,321
Independent	Eleanor Rathbone	33.3	3,331	3,394
Liberal	Robert Seymour Conway	22.3	2,231	2,281
Unionist	Amherst Selby-Bigge	17.6	1,762	eliminated
Electorate: 13,775 Valid: 10,003 Quota: 3,335 Turnout: 72.6

== Works ==
- Verner's Law in Italy: an essay in the history of the Indo-European sibilants (1887)
- The Italic Dialects, edited with a grammar and glossary. (2 volumes, 1897)
- Vergil: an Inaugural Lecture (1903)
- Virgil's Messianic Eclogue (1907) with Joseph B. Mayor and W. Warde Fowler
- The Restored Pronunciation of Greek and Latin with Tables and practical Illustrations (1908) with Edward Vernon Arnold
- The youth of Vergil: a lecture delivered in the John Rylands Library on 9 December, 1914
- Horace as Poet Laureate: an Address on the Power of Poetry (1917)
- Livius, Ab urbe condita, libri i-x, edn., Oxford, OCT (1914-1919) (with C.F. Walters)
- New studies of a great inheritance, being lectures on the modern worth of some ancient writers (1921)
- The Making of Latin: an Introduction to Latin, Greek and English Etymology (1923)
- Harvard Lectures on the Vergilian Age (1928)
- Poetry and Government: a Study of the Power of Vergil (1928)
- Livius, Ab urbe condita, libri xxi-xxx, edn., Oxford, OCT (1929-1935) (with C.F. Walters & S.K. Johnson)
- The Great Writers of Rome (1930)
- Makers of Europe, being the James Henry Morgan Lectures in Dickinson College for 1930 (1931)
- The Value of the Medicean Codex of Vergil (1931)
- The Prae-Italic Dialects of Italy, Part I: The Venetic Inscriptions (1933)
- Ancient Italy and Modern Religion, being the Hibbert Lectures for 1932 (1933)
- P. Vergili Maronis - Aeneidos, liber primus (1935)
