= Verulux solmaculata =

Scientific classification
- Kingdom: Animalia
- Phylum: Chordata
- Class: Actinopterygii
- Division: Teleostei
- Order: Gobiiformes
- Family: Apogonidae
- Genus: Verulux
- Species: V. solmaculata

Binomial name
- Verulux solmaculata Yoshida & Motomura 2016

Species of fish

Verulux solmaculata, the sunspot cardinalfish, is a species of marine ray-finned fish belonging to the family Apogonidae, the cardinalfishes. This cardinalfish is found in the Western Pacific Ocean.

== Taxonomy ==
Verulux solmaculata was first formally described in 2016 by the Japanese ichthyologists Tomohiro Yoshida and Hiroyuki Motomura with its type locality given as between Fergusson and Goodenough islands, in the D'Entrecasteaux Islands, Papua New Guinea, at 09°21'S, 150°25'E, from a depth of 18–20 m (59–66 ft). This species is classified in the genus Verulux, described a new subgenus of Rhabdamia in 1972 by Thomas Henry Fraser with R. cypselurus , then its only species, designated as the type species, as well as being the type species by monotypy. This genus is placed in the monotypic tribe Veruluxini within the subfamily Apogoninae. The family Apogonidae is in the suborder Apogonoidei in the order Gobiiformes.

== Etymology ==
Verulux solmaculata is classified in the genus Verulux, this name is made up of veru, a "javelin" or "dart", and lux, meaning "light". This alludes to the elongate body shape of this species and its bioluminescent organs. The specific name, solmaculata, means "sunspot", a reference to the clear black spot,on the caudal peduncle, resembking a sunspot.

== Description ==
Verulux solmaculata is a small, almost transparent cardinalfish which has three black stripes on the anterior part of the body one from the tip of the snout to the front of the eye, one from the preopercular margin to the middle of the operculum, and one from the back edge of the eye to the angle of the preoperculum. It can be distinguished from its only congener, V. cypselurus, by there being an obvious black blotch at the base of the caudal fin, while this is lacking in V. cypselurus, and in having a, a broader black longitudinal band on each caudal fin lobe which covers 3–5 rays in this species as compared to 1–3 rays in V. cypselurus. This species also has a photophore below the posterior edge of the gill opening. This species has a maximum standard length of 4.1 cm (1.6 in).

== Distribution and habitat ==
Verulux solmaculata is found in the Western Pacific Ocean where it occurs in the Australian terrirory of Ashmore and Cartier Islands in the Timor Sea and around Papua New Guines.
