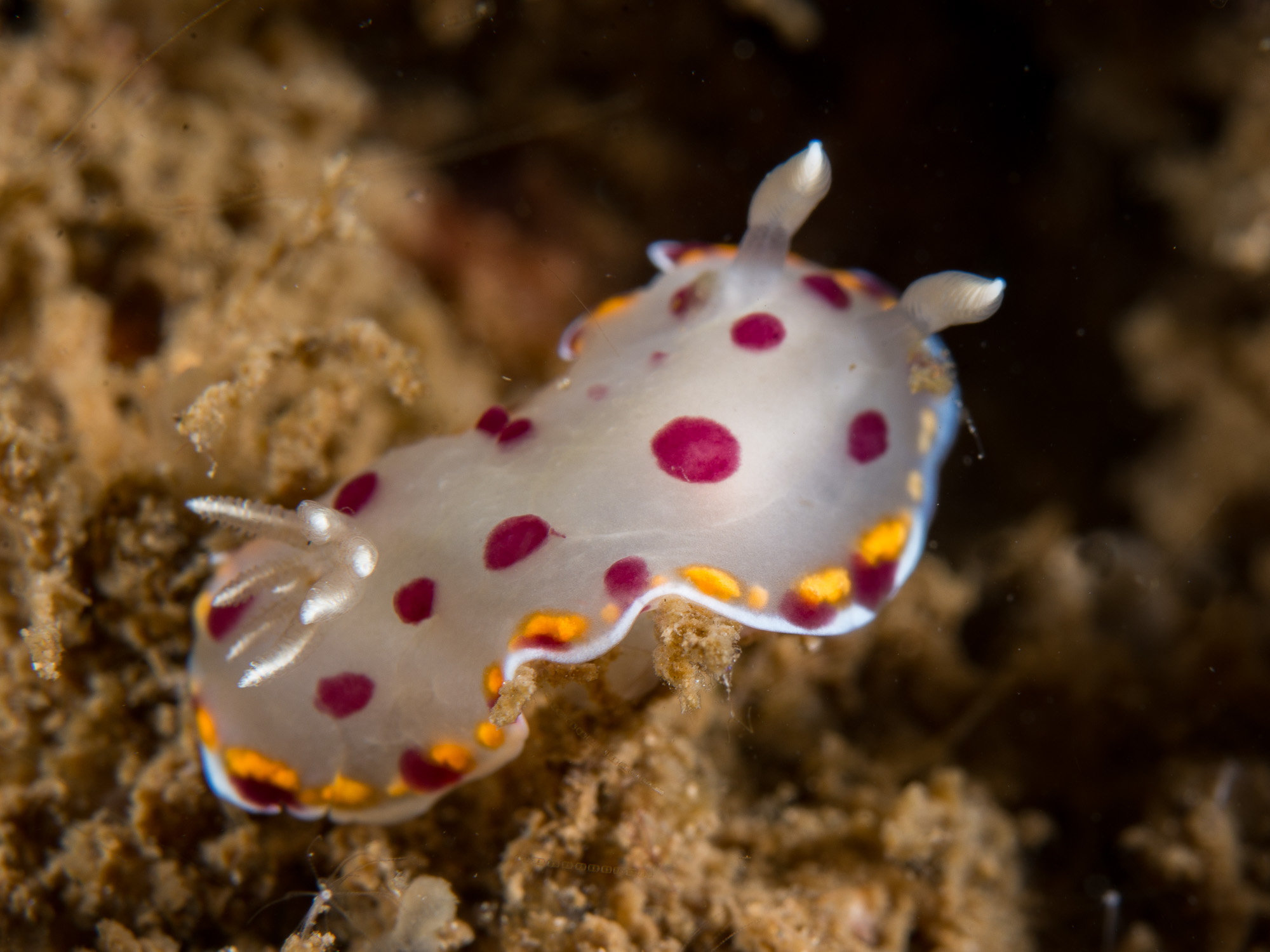
- Bima Bay, Sumbawa, Indonesia

Scientific classification
- Kingdom: Animalia
- Phylum: Mollusca
- Class: Gastropoda
- Order: Nudibranchia
- Family: Chromodorididae
- Genus: Goniobranchus
- Species: G. bimaensis

Binomial name
- Goniobranchus bimaensis (Bergh, 1905)

Synonyms
- Chromodoris bimaensis Bergh, 1905 (basionym)

= Goniobranchus bimaensis =

Species of gastropod

Goniobranchus bimaensis is a species of colourful sea slug, a dorid nudibranch, a marine gastropod mollusc in the family Chromodorididae.

== Distribution ==
This species was described from Bima Bay, Sumbawa, Indonesia. It was collected on the Siboga Expedition. The type locality is given as Bima, station 47. This species is considered to be a synonym of Goniobranchus tumuliferus by Rudman.

== Description ==
Goniobranchus bimaensis has a translucent white mantle with a border of elongate yellow spots interspersed with maroon spots. At the very edge of the mantle is an opaque white line which is slightly variable in width. Round maroon spots are scattered over the back. The tips of the gill leaves and rhinophores are opaque white. Animals with similar colouration include Goniobranchus kitae which differs in having small white spots all over the rhinophores and gills and Goniobranchus tumuliferus which, as illustrated on Sea Slug Forum, is likely to include several species at present.
