= Verulux cypselurus =

- School of swallow-tail cardinalfishes in Seychelles.

Conservation status
- Least Concern (IUCN 3.1)

Scientific classification
- Kingdom: Animalia
- Phylum: Chordata
- Class: Actinopterygii
- Division: Teleostei
- Order: Gobiiformes
- Family: Apogonidae
- Genus: Verulux
- Species: V. cypselurus

Binomial name
- Verulux cypselurus (M. C. W. Weber, 1909)

Synonyms
- Rhabdamia cypselurus M. C. W. Weber, 1909

Species of fish

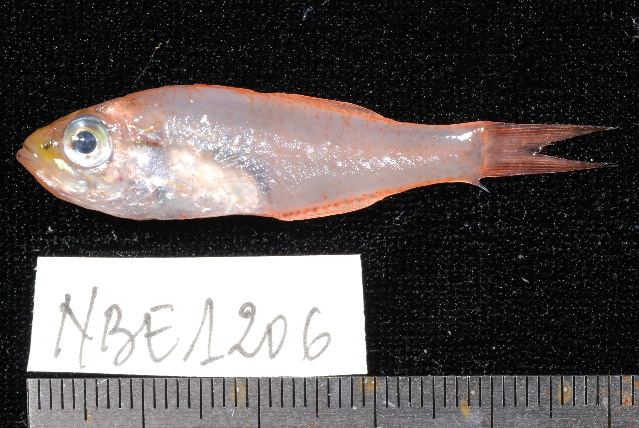
Dead exemplar

Verulux cypselurus, the swallow-tail cardinalfish, schooling cardinalfish or blacknosed cardinalfish, is a species of marine ray-finned fish belonging to the family Apogonidae, the cardinalfishes. This cardinalfish is found in the Indian and Pacific Oceans.

== Taxonomy ==
Verulux cypselurus was first formally described as Rhabdamia cypselurus in 1909 by the German-Dutch zoologist Max Carl Wilhelm Weber with its type locality given as Kawa, western Ceram, Maluku Province, Indonesia, Strait of Boano, Seram Sea, at around. 3°01'S, 128°04'E. In 1972 Thomas Henry Fraser described a new subgenus of Rhabdamia he called Verulux with R. cypselurus , its only species, designated as the type species, as well as being the type species by monotypy. This genus is placed in the monotypic tribe Veruluxini within the subfamily Apogoninae. The family Apogonidae is in the suborder Apogonoidei in the order Gobiiformes.

== Etymology ==
Verulux cypselurus is the type species of the genus Verulux, this name is made up of veru, a "javelin" or "dart", and lux, meaning "light". This alludes to the elongate body shape of this species and its bioluminescent organs. The specific name, cypselurus, is derived from kypselos, a king of swallow, and oura, which means "tail". This is a reference to the forked caudal fin with pointed lobes.

== Description ==
Verulux cypselurus has a fusiform body with a compressed cross section and it reaches a total length of 6 cm (2.4 in). There are 6 spines in the first dorsal fin, a single spine and 9 soft rays in the second dorsal fin while the anal fin has 2 spines and 9 soft rays. The body of this fish is translucent, abdomen and much of the head are iridescent silver; the snout has a black streak between the upper jaw and the eye. The tips of the jaws are blackish. The flanks are pale greenish or yellowish, there are minute spots on the nape and the back up to the second dorsal fin. The dorsal, anal and caudal fins have a vermilion tinge. There is a dark horizontal stripe, the rest of the fin is transluscent.

== Distribution and habitat ==
Verulux cypselurus is found in the Indian and Pacific Oceans. In the western Indian Ocean it occurs in the Red Sea, the Gulf of Oman, the Persian Gulf, Mozambique, the Comoros Islands, the Seychelles, the Maldives and the Chagos Islands. In the eastern Indian Ocean it is found in the Andaman Sea east to Micronesia, Kiribati and Vanuatu, north to the Yaeyama Islands of southern Japan and south to northern Australia and New Caledonia. In Australia the swallowtail cardinalfish is found of northwestern Western Australia, the Ashmore and Cartier Islands in the Timor Sea, the northern Great Barrier Reef and reefs in the Coral Sea. This species is found at depths between 2 and 50 m (6 ft 7 in and 164 ft 1 in) around sheltered, coastal reef slopes, in lagoons and on outer reef drop-offs close to deep water where there are large coral heads.

== Behaviour ==
Verulux cypselurus forms large schools in amongst rocks or over corals during the day, frequently forming mixed schools with Rhabdamia gracilis. The spread out at night to feed on zooplankton. These fishes form distinct pairs in courtship and spawning.
