= Mesospora =

Scientific classification
- Domain: Eukaryota
- Clade: Diaphoretickes
- Clade: Sar
- Clade: Stramenopiles
- Phylum: Gyrista
- Subphylum: Ochrophytina
- Class: Phaeophyceae
- Order: Ralfsiales
- Family: Mesosporaceae
- Genus: Mesospora; Weber-van Bosse

Genus of macroalgae

Mesospora is a genus of macroalgae that was described by Anna Weber-van Bosse in 1911. Although considered a taxonomic synonym of Hapalospongidion, the World Register of Marine Species cites six accepted species of the genus.

== Description ==
Mesospora is characterized as a crustose brown macroalga with a saxicolous habitat, gelatinous crustose thallus, adherent to the substrate without rhizoids, several cells thick basal layer, unbranched erect free filaments, intercalary plurilocular reproductive structures uniseriate or biseriate and unilocular reproductive structures stalked and borne laterally at base of erect vegetative filaments.

Mesospora is said to be morphologically similar to Diplura. Their difference lies in the number of chloroplasts per cell. The Mesospora has a single chloroplast per cell, a one-celled sterile tip of the erect filament and unilocular sporangia, while the Diplura has several chloroplasts per cell and lacks unilocular sporangia.

== Species ==
Species according to WoRMS as of April 17, 2022.

- Mesospora elongata S.W.Poong, P.E.Lim & S.M.Phang, 2013
- Mesospora indopacifica S.-W.Poong, P.-E.Lim & S-M.Phang, 2017
- Mesospora lombokensis S.-W.Poong, P.-E.Lim & S.-M.Phang, 2017
- Mesospora negrosensis J.A.West & H.P.Calumpong, 1996
- Mesospora pangoensis (Setchell) Chihara & J.Tanaka, 1982
  - Mesospora pangoensis var. galapagensis (Setchell & Gardner) Chihara & J.Tanaka, 1982
- Mesospora schmidtii Weber-van Bosse, 1911
