= Versluys =

Versluys is a surname. Notable people with the surname include:

- Jan Versluys (1873–1939), Dutch zoologist
- Patrick Versluys (born 1958), Belgian cyclist
- Stephanus Versluys (1694–1736), 21st Governor of Dutch Ceylon
