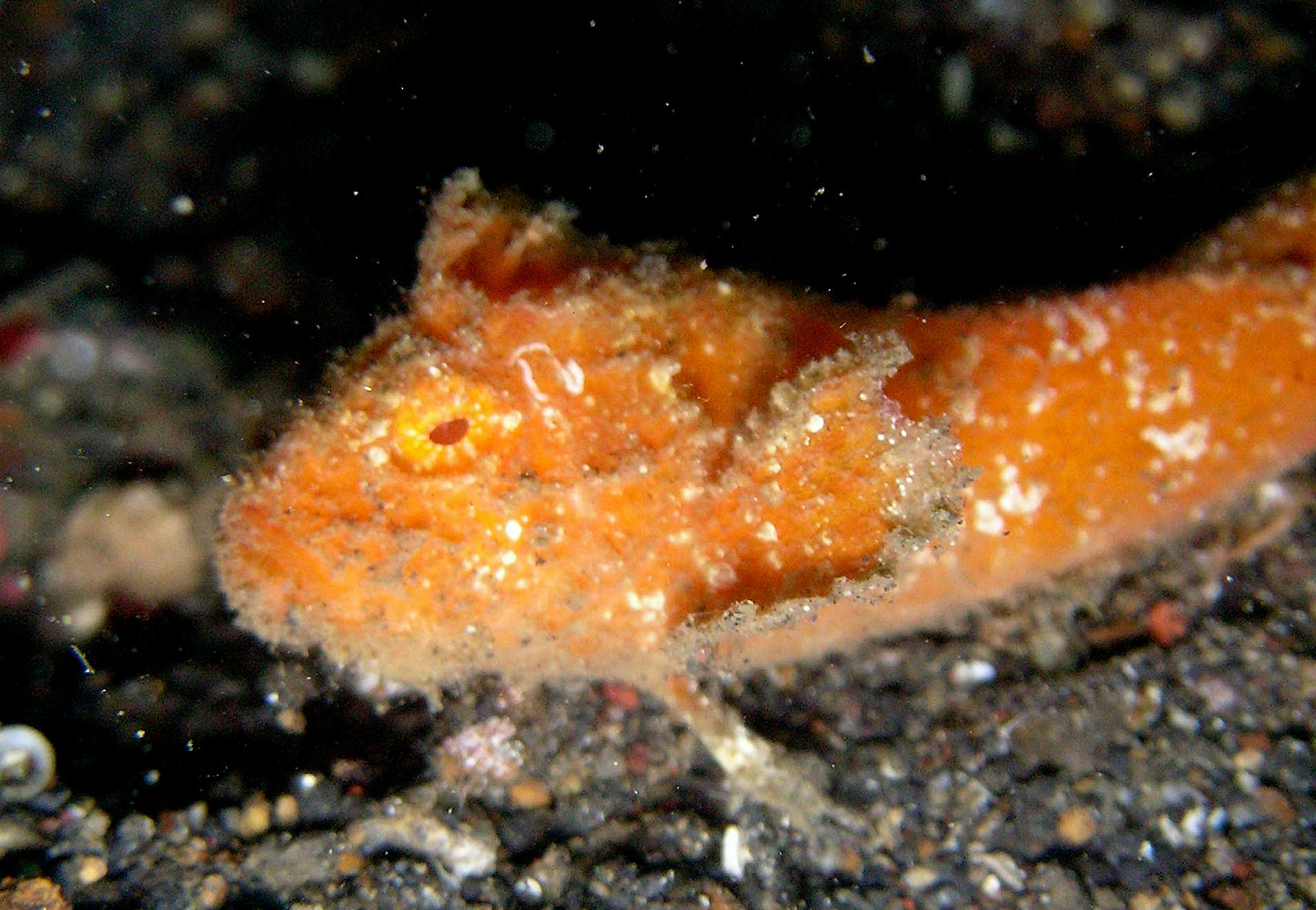

Scientific classification
- Kingdom: Animalia
- Phylum: Chordata
- Class: Actinopterygii
- Order: Perciformes
- Family: Synanceiidae
- Genus: Paraploactis
- Species: P. obbesi

Binomial name
- Paraploactis obbesi Weber, 1913

Synonyms
- Coccotropus obbesi (Weber, 1913)

= Sulu velvetfish =

Species of fish

The Sulu velvetfish (Paraploactis obbesi) is a species of marine ray-finned fish, a velvetfish belonging to the family Aploactinidae. This fish is found in the western Pacific Ocean. It grows to a maximum length of about 5 cm (2.0 in).
