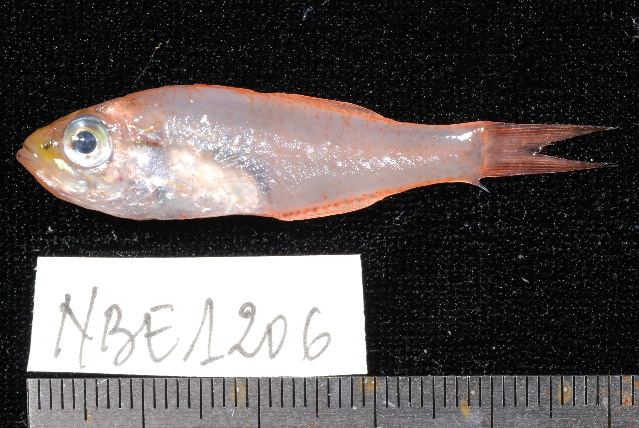
- Verulux cypselurus

Scientific classification
- Kingdom: Animalia
- Phylum: Chordata
- Class: Actinopterygii
- Order: Gobiiformes
- Family: Apogonidae
- Subfamily: Apogoninae
- Genus: Verulux; T. H. Fraser, 1972

Type species
- Rhabdamia cypselurus Weber, 1909

= Verulux =

Genus of fishes

Verulux is a genus of fishes in the family Apogonidae found in the Indian and Pacific Oceans.

== Species ==
The recognized species in this genus are:

- Verulux cypselurus (M. C. W. Weber, 1909) (Swallow-tail cardinalfish)
- Verulux solmaculata Yoshida & Motomura, 2016 (sun-spot cardinalfish)
