= Mesospora negrosensis =

Scientific classification
- Domain: Eukaryota
- Clade: Diaphoretickes
- Clade: Sar
- Clade: Stramenopiles
- Phylum: Gyrista
- Subphylum: Ochrophytina
- Class: Phaeophyceae
- Order: Ralfsiales
- Family: Mesosporaceae
- Genus: Mesospora
- Species: M. negrosensis

Binomial name
- Mesospora negrosensis J.A.West & H.P.Calumpong 1996

Species of macroalgae

Mesospora negrosensis is a species of macroalga occurring in the western Atlantic.

== Taxonomy ==
Mesospora negrosensis is one of nine species under the genus based on the record of AlgaeBase, of which only seven are accepted taxonomically based on literature.

The specific epithet negrosensis was derived from where the locality of the holotype species was first collected (Lalaan, Negros Oriental, Philippines).

== Morphology ==
The genus Mesospora as described by Anna Weber-van Bosse (1911) is a crustose brown macroalga with the following characteristics: a saxicolous habitat, gelatinous crustose thallus, adherent to the substrate without rhizoids, several cells thick basal layer, unbranched erect free filaments, intercalary plurilocular reproductive structures uniseriate or biseriate and unilocular reproductive structures stalked and borne laterally at base of erect vegetative filaments.

Mesospora is said to be morphologically similar to Diplura. Their difference lies in the number of chloroplasts per cell. The Mesospora has a single chloroplast per cell, a one-celled sterile tip of the erect filament and unilocular sporangia, while the Diplura has several chloroplasts per cell and lacks unilocular sporangia.

The plurilocular reproductive structures of M. negrosensis are described as being mostly uniseriate while M. schmidtii were described as biseriate and triseriate and compared to genus Diplura, where the plurilocular sporangia are often biseriate. M. negrosensis was said to be plurilocular sporangia and non-unilocular as compared to M. schmidtii, which contains unilocular sporangia.

== Distribution ==
The holotype was collected on a rock at Lalaan, Negros Oriental, Philippines. Poong et al., in 2013 collected a specimen from the water of Malaysia.

== Ecology ==
Mesospora negrosensis are usually found attached to small igneous rocks at the mid-intertidal region with no other macroalgae present. Nearby large rocks were covered with patches of Lyngbya and other unbranched filamentous cyanobacteria. The area is said to be nutrient-rich due to runoff water from agricultural lands and storm drainage.
