= Jan Versluys =

Dutch zoologist (1873–1939)

Jan Versluys (1 September 1873 in Groningen – 22 January 1939 in Vienna) was a Dutch zoologist.

He studied biology at the University of Amsterdam, and afterwards participated on a scientific voyage to the Caribbean aboard the vessel Chazalie. In 1898 he obtained his doctorate from the University of Giessen, then in 1899/1900 served as an assistant to Max Carl Wilhelm Weber on the Siboga Expedition to the Netherlands East Indies. As a result of the mission, he published a monograph on Gorgonians, titled "Die Gorgoniden der Siboga-Expedition". Later on in his career, he worked as a professor of zoology at the universities of Ghent (from 1916) and Vienna (from 1925). Versluys is known to have corresponded with, and had visited American paleontologist Barnum Brown in 1904.

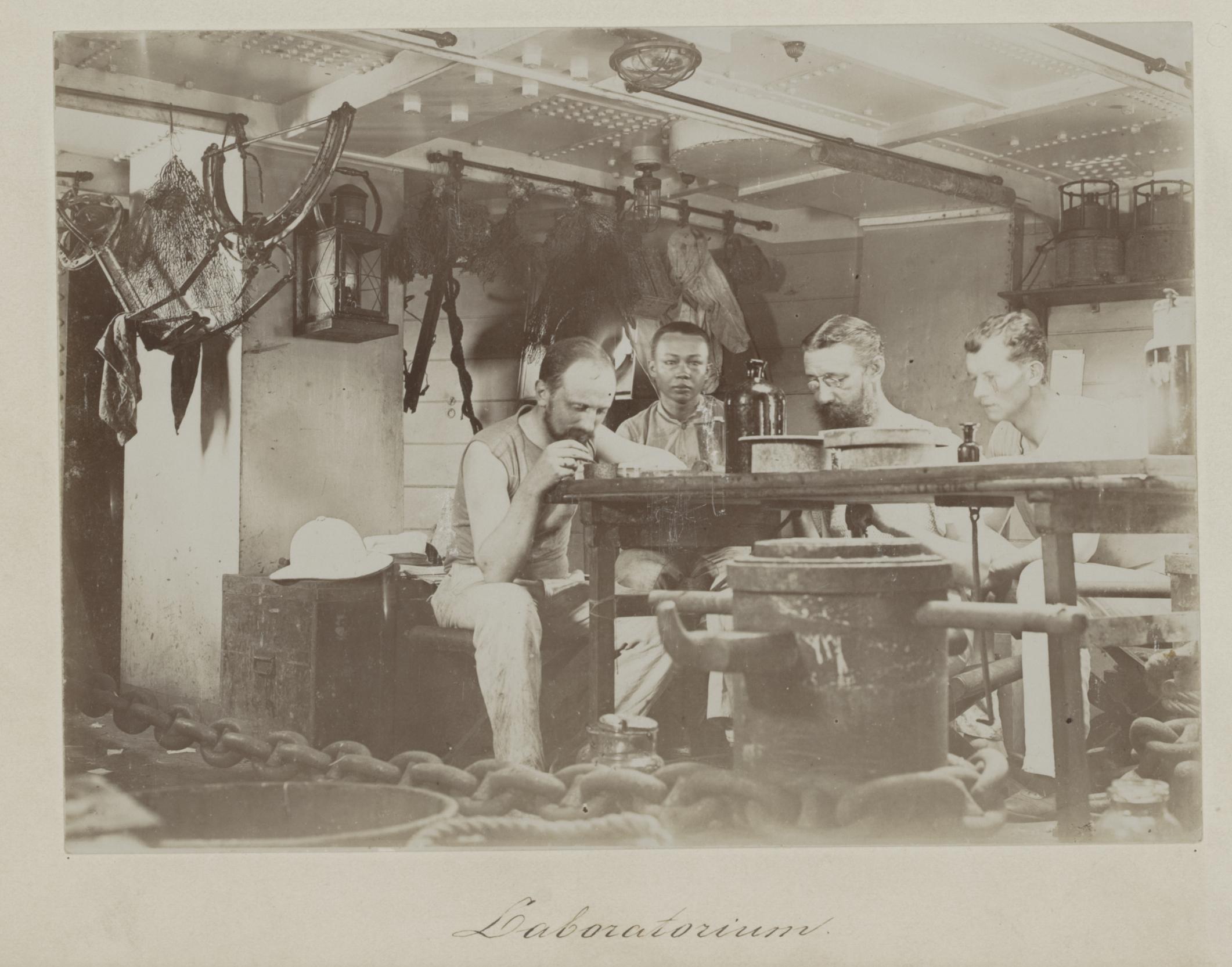
Siboga Expedition group in the laboratory (Versluys at far right).

Taxa with the epithet of versluysi commemorate his name, an example being the amphipod subspecies Niphargus longicaudatus versluysi.

== Selected works ==
- Die mittlere und äussere Ohrspähre der Lacertilia und Rhynchocephalia (dissertation), 1898 – The middle and outer ear-sphere of Lacertilia and Rhynchocephalia.
- Die Gorgoniden der Siboga-Expedition — English publication by Charles Cleveland Nutting as "The Gorgonacea of the Siboga expedition" (1902–11).
- Entwicklung der Columella auris bei den Lacertiliern, 1904 – Development of the columella auris in Lacertilia.
- Ueber Kaumuskeln bei Lacertilia, 1904 – On the masseter of Lacertilia.
- Die Salamander und die ursprünglichsten vierbeinigen Landwirbeltiere, 1909 – The salamander and the most primitive four-legged land vertebrates.
- Der Schädel des Skelettes von Trachodon annectens im Senckenberg-Museum, 1921 – The skull of the skeleton of Trachodon annectens at the Senckenberg Museum.
- Die Verwandtschaft der Merostomata mit den Arachnida und den anderen Abteilungen der Arthropoda (with Reinhard Demoll), 1921 – The relationship of Merostomata with arachnids and the other divisions of Arthropoda.
- Die Abstammung und Differenzierung der Gigantostraken, 1923 – The origin and differentiation of gigantostraca.
