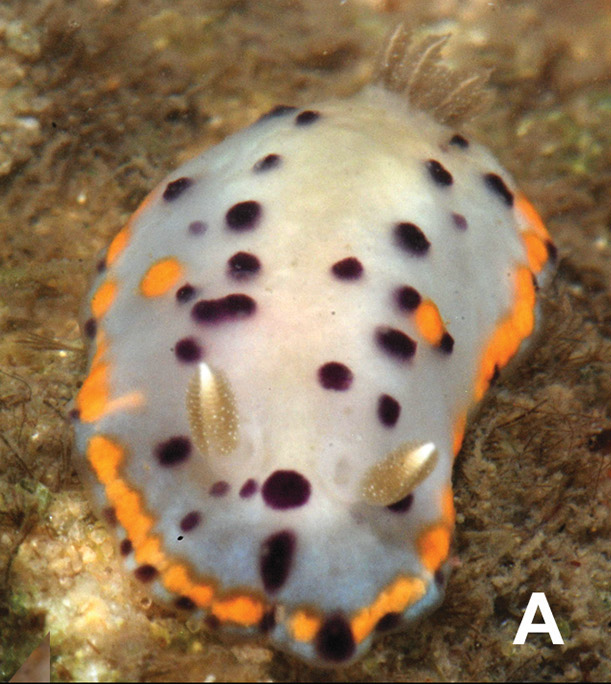

Scientific classification
- Kingdom: Animalia
- Phylum: Mollusca
- Class: Gastropoda
- Order: Nudibranchia
- Family: Chromodorididae
- Genus: Goniobranchus
- Species: G. kitae

Binomial name
- Goniobranchus kitae (Gosliner, 1994)

Synonyms
- Chromodoris kitae Gosliner, 1994 (basionym)

= Goniobranchus kitae =

Species of mollusc

Goniobranchus kitae is a species of colourful sea slug, a dorid nudibranch, a marine gastropod mollusc in the family Chromodorididae.

== Distribution ==
This species is known from Madagascar and South Africa.

== Description ==
Goniobranchus kitae has a white translucent mantle with a broken yellow submarginal line at the edge. The mantle is covered with large round magenta spots. The gill leaves and rhinophores are translucent with small white spots on the surfaces. It has some similarity to Goniobranchus bimaensis and Goniobranchus tumuliferus.
