= Siboga expedition =

Dutch scientific expedition to Indonesia (1899–1900)

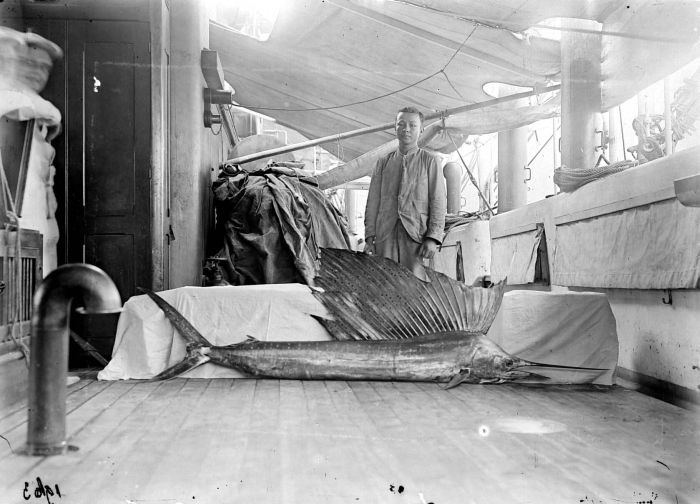
- Leader: Max Carl Wilhelm Weber
- Participants: Max Carl Wilhelm Weber; Anna Weber-van Bosse; Hugo Frederik Nierstrasz; Jan Versluys; Jozef Willem Huijsmans

Route
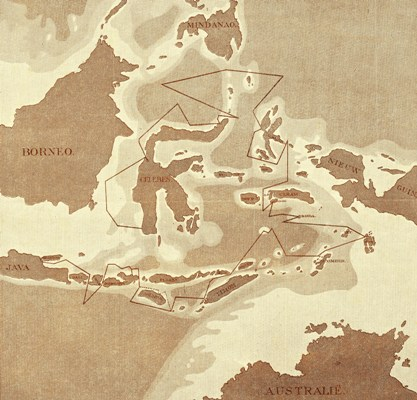

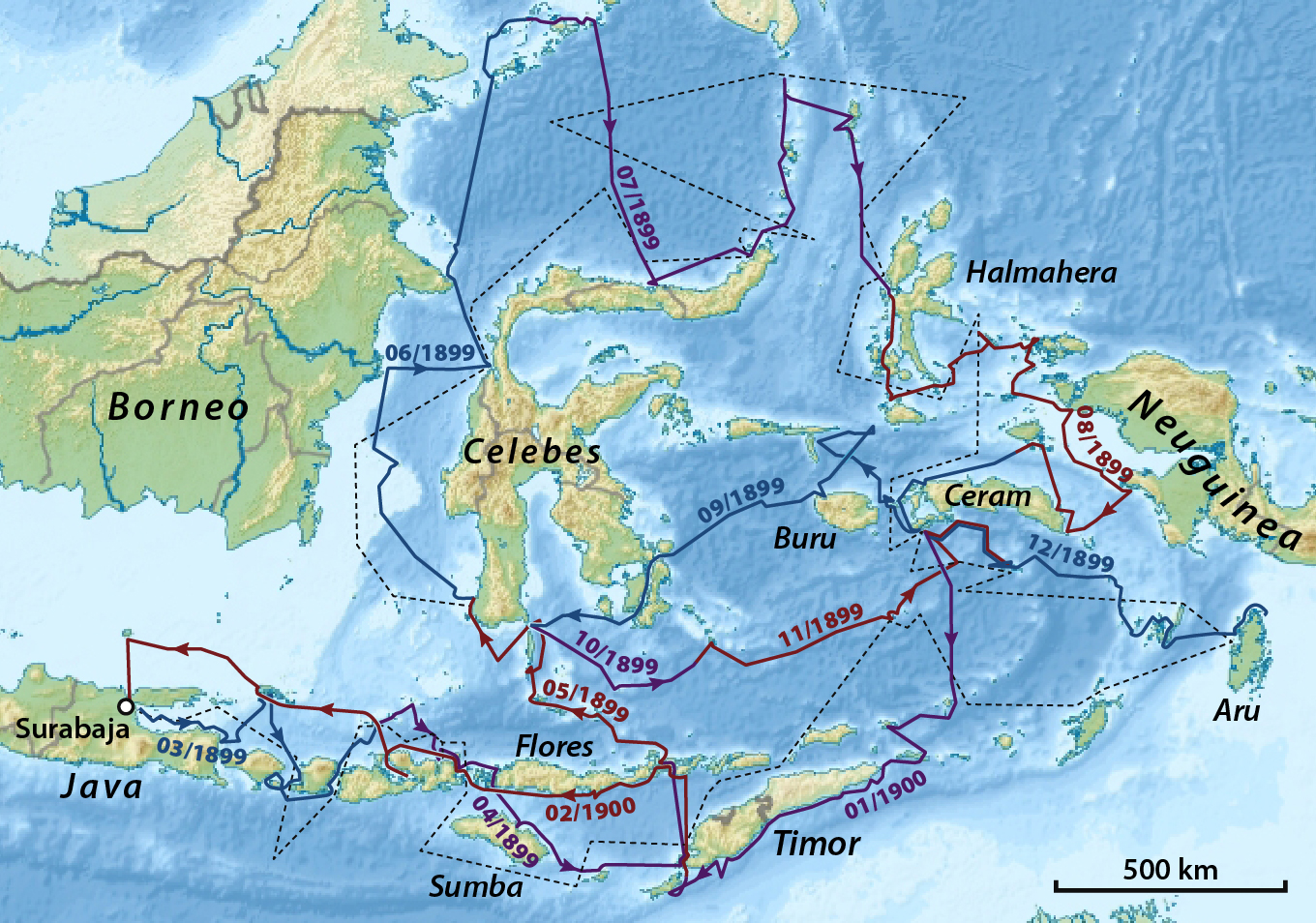
Expedition route of the Siboga 1899/1900 (coloured) and proposed route by Weber from 1898 (black)

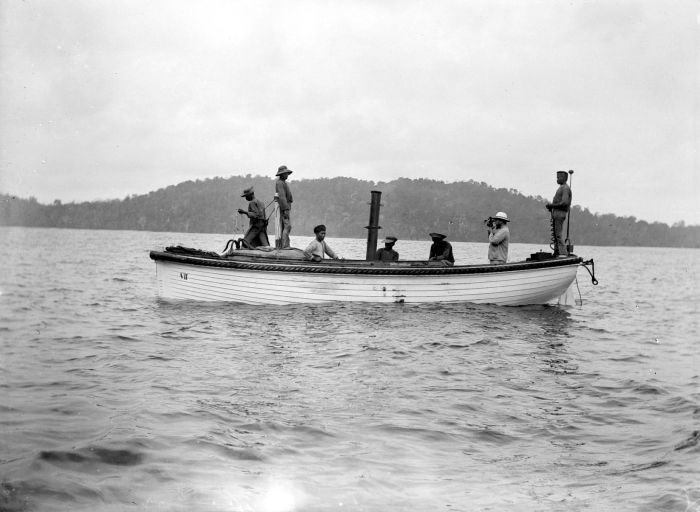
Survey during the Siboga expedition. (Photo from the collection of Tropenmuseum.)

The Siboga expedition was a Dutch zoological and hydrographic expedition to Indonesia from March 1899 to February 1900.

The leader of the expedition was Max Carl Wilhelm Weber. Other members of the crew were his wife Anna Weber-van Bosse, the zoologist and first assistant Jan Versluys, the zoologist and second assistant Hugo Frederik Nierstrasz, the physician A. Schmidt, and the artist Jozef Willem Huysmans. Captain Gustaaf Frederik Tydeman was responsible for making hydrographic measurements.

== Gallery ==
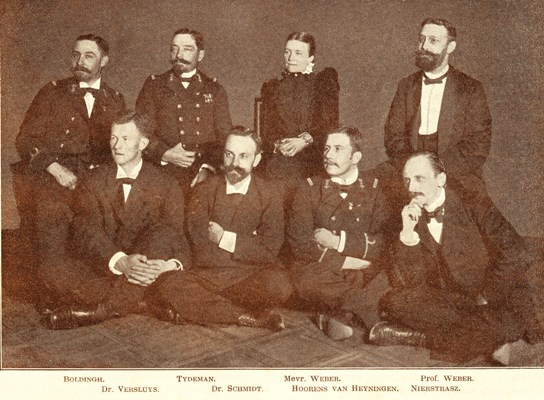
Siboga expedition group portrait

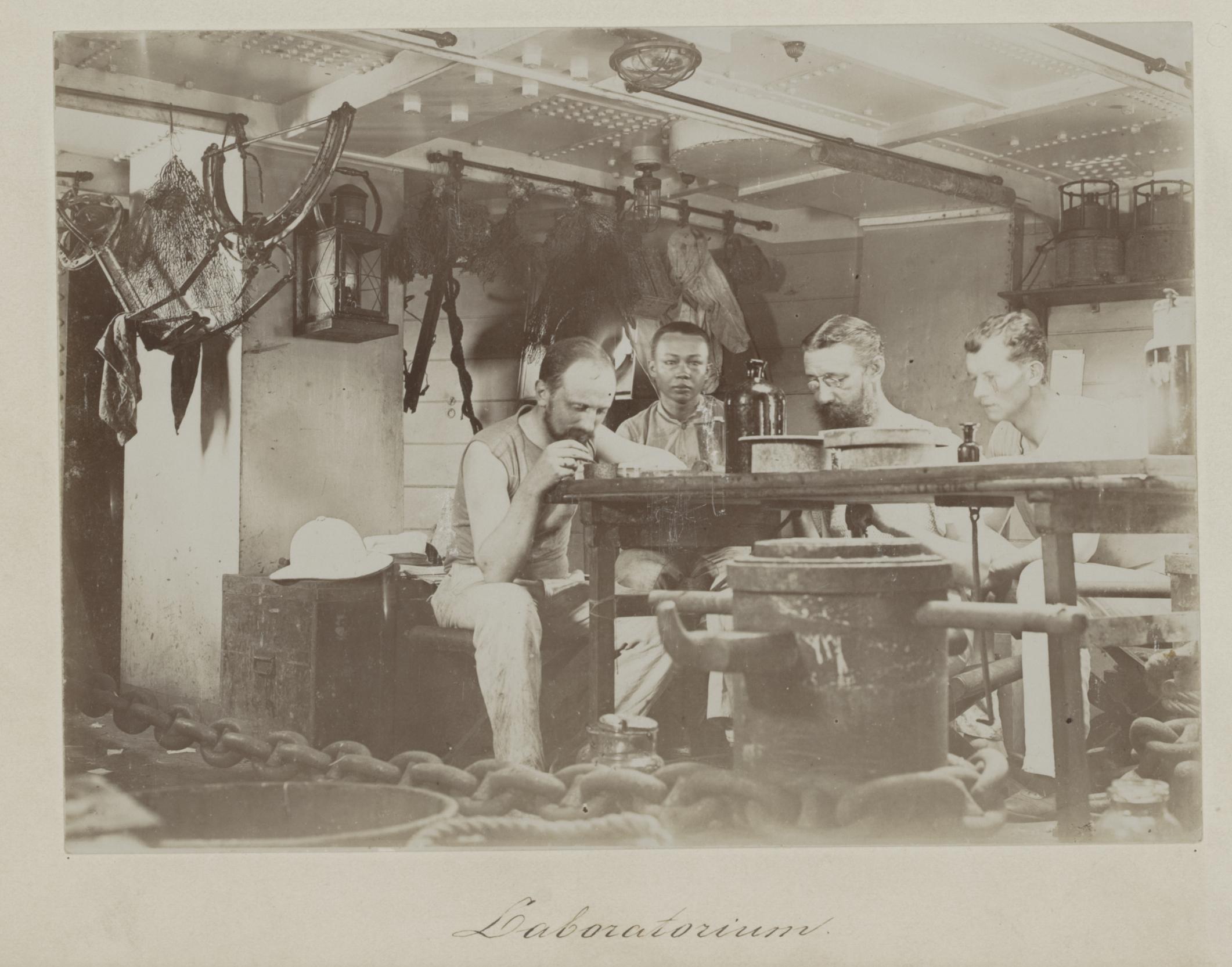
Siboga expedition laboratory

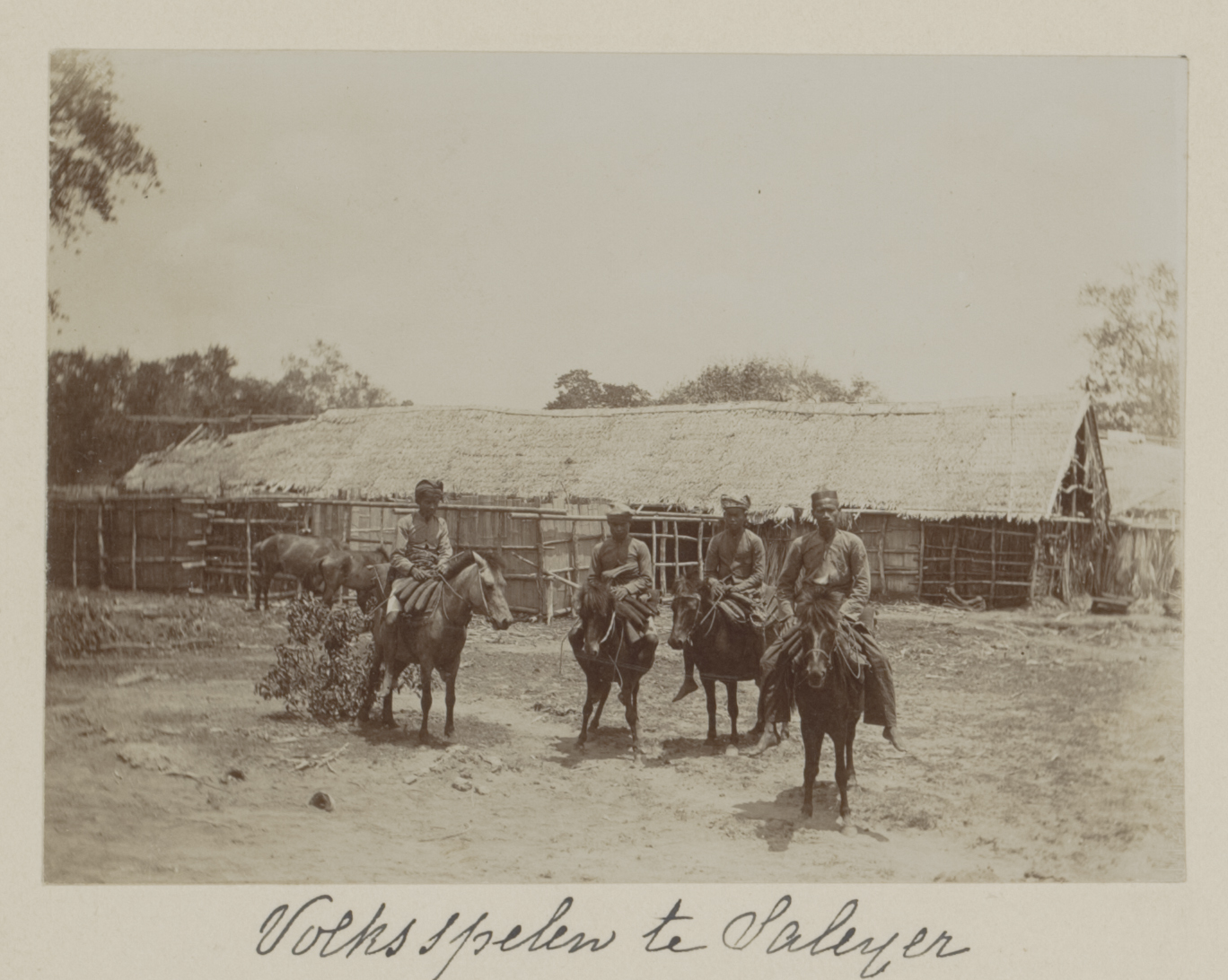
Selayar people riding horses

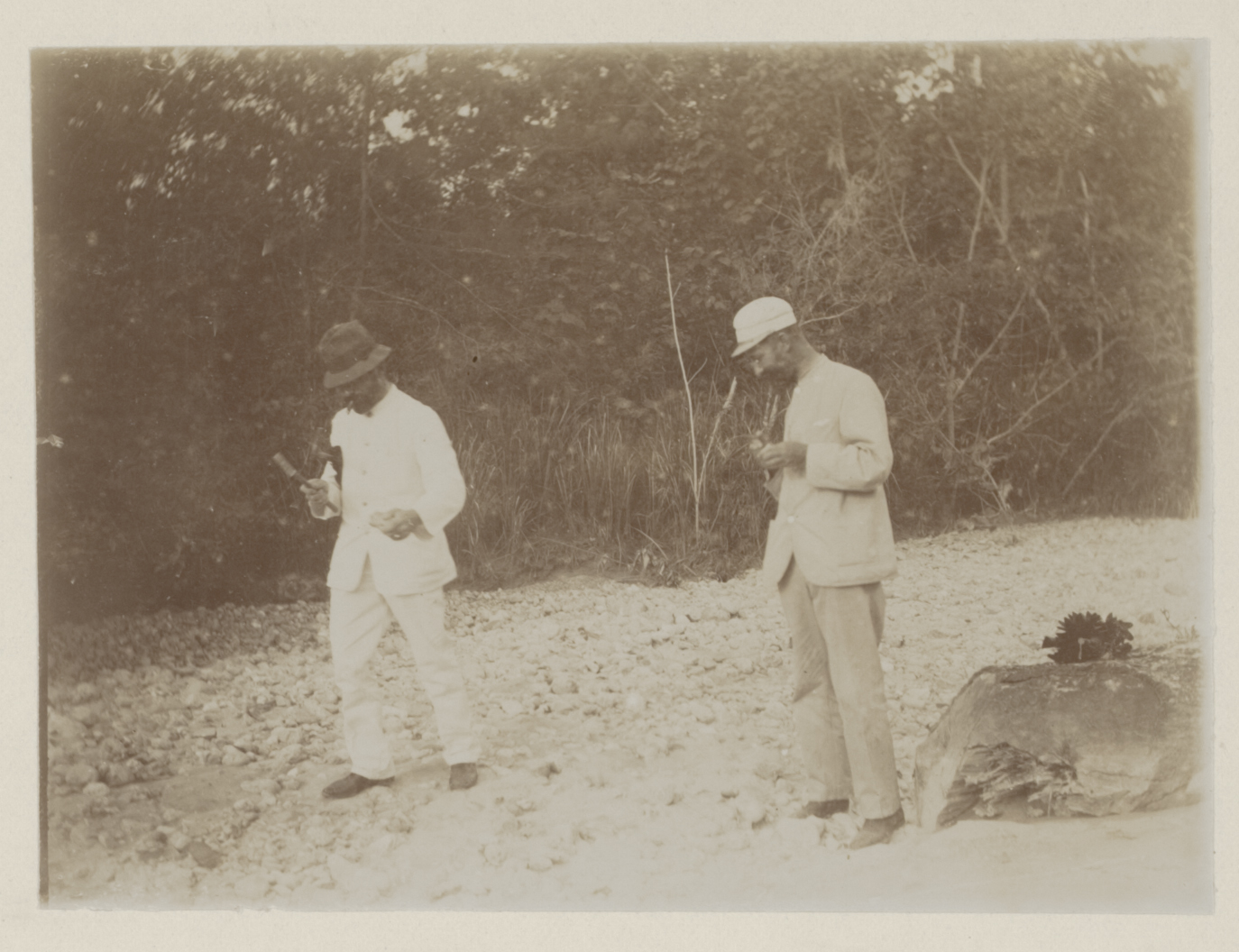
Max Carl Wilhelm Weber (left) and Gustaaf Frederik Tydeman in Buru

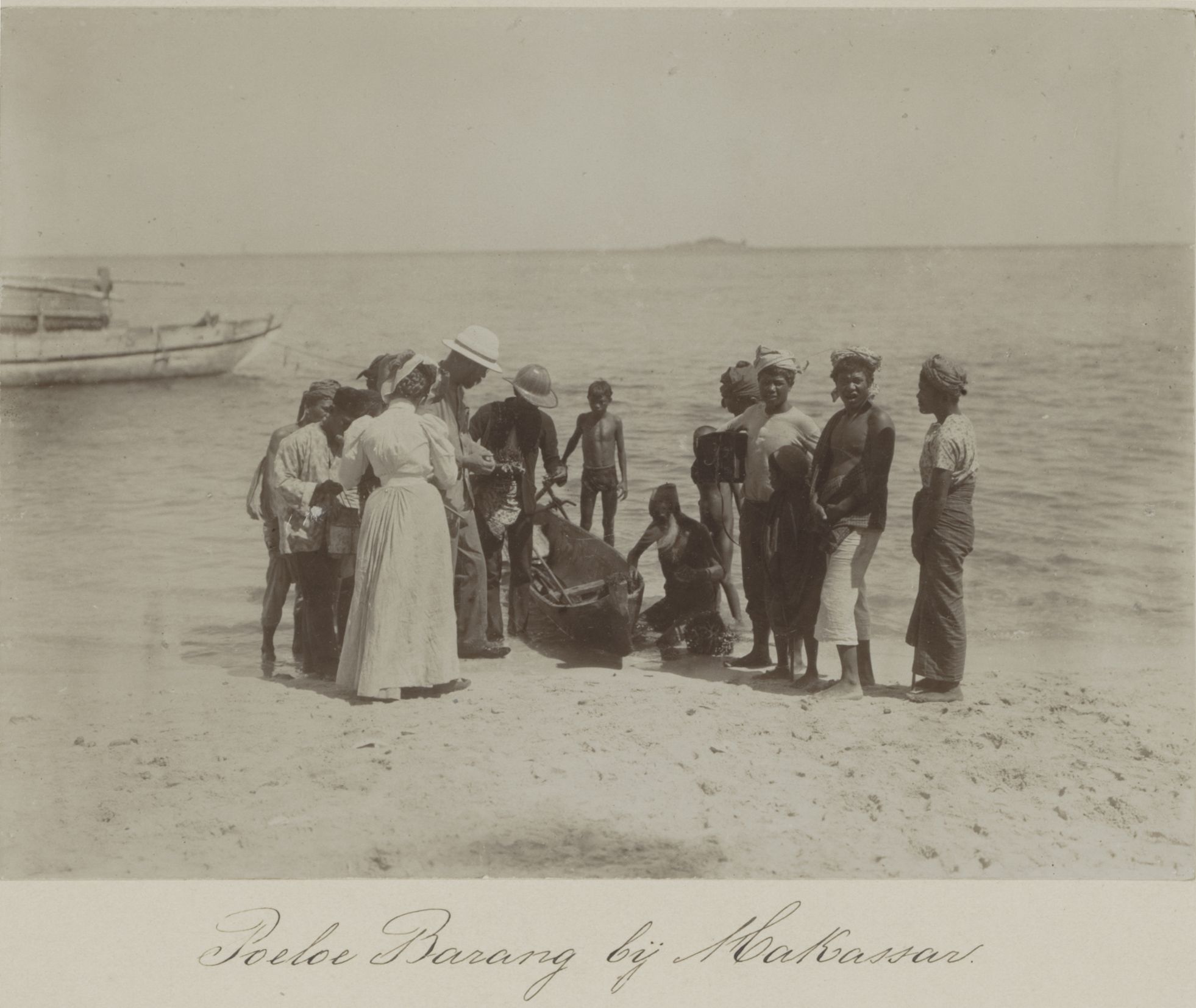
Anna Weber-van Bosse and natives

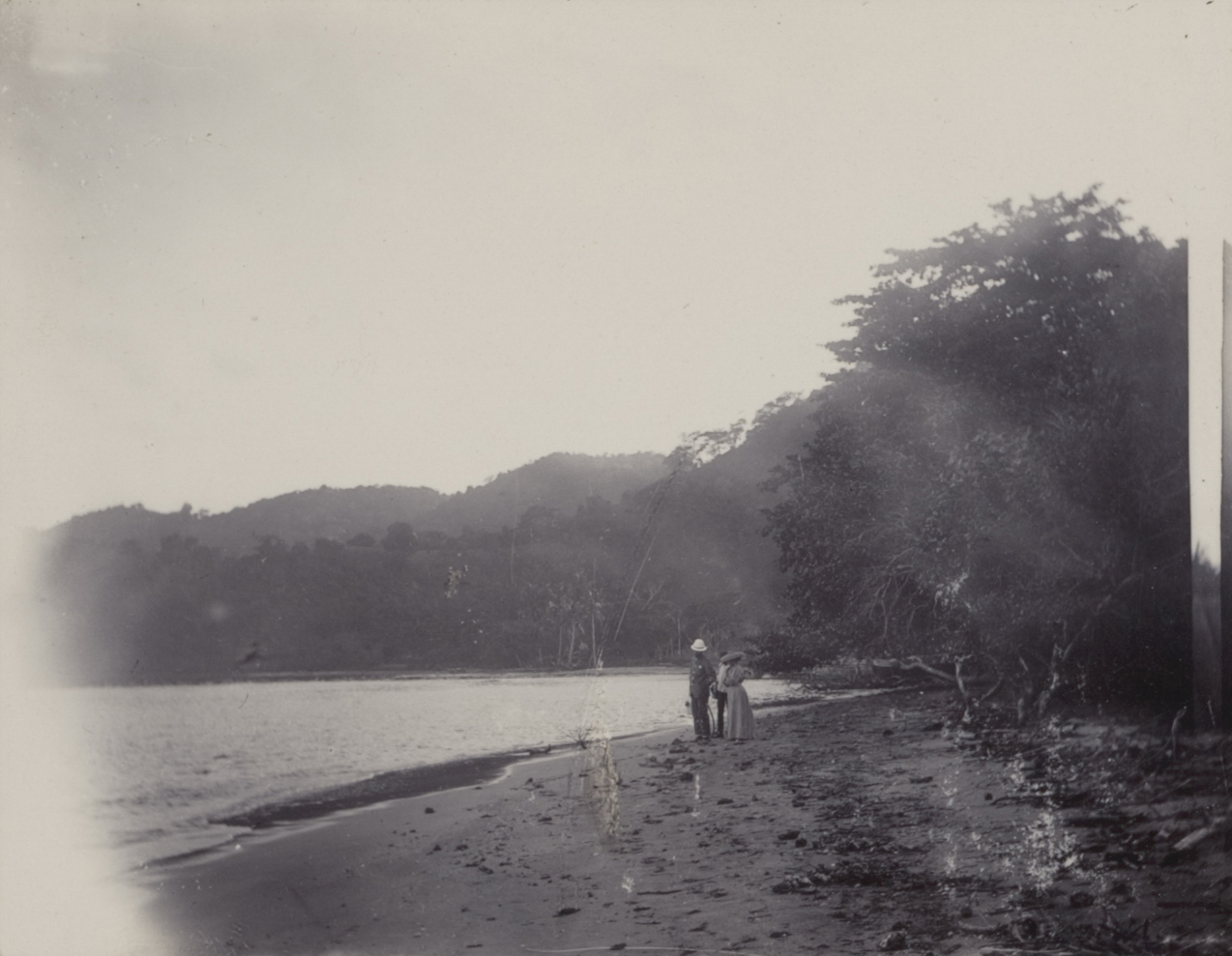

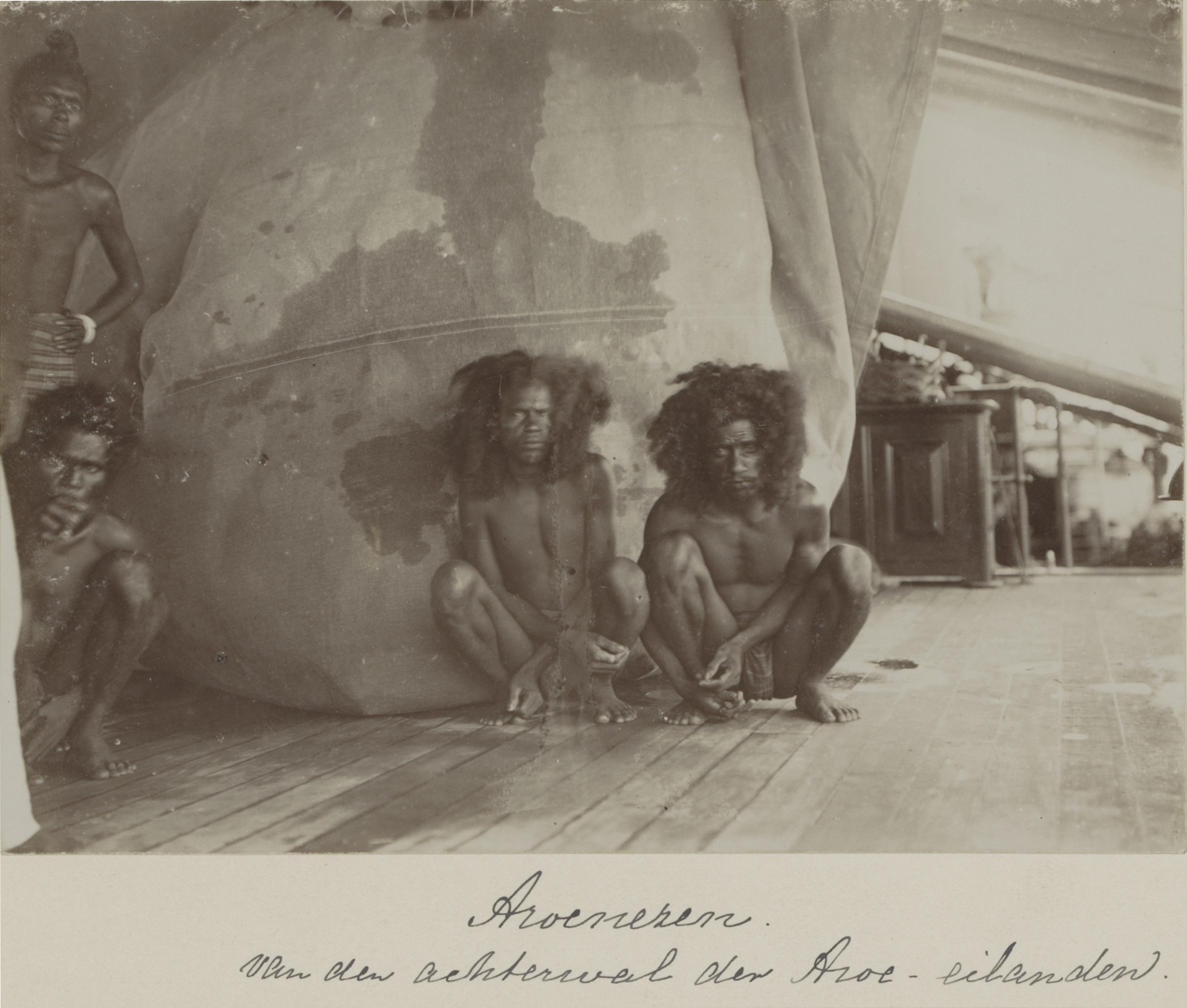
Inhabitants of the eastern coast of the Aru Islands, photographed late 1899

== See also ==
- Rudolph Bergh
- Ethel Sarel Gepp
- Paul Mayer (zoologist)
- Mattheus Marinus Schepman
- Anna Weber-van Bosse
- Weber Deep
