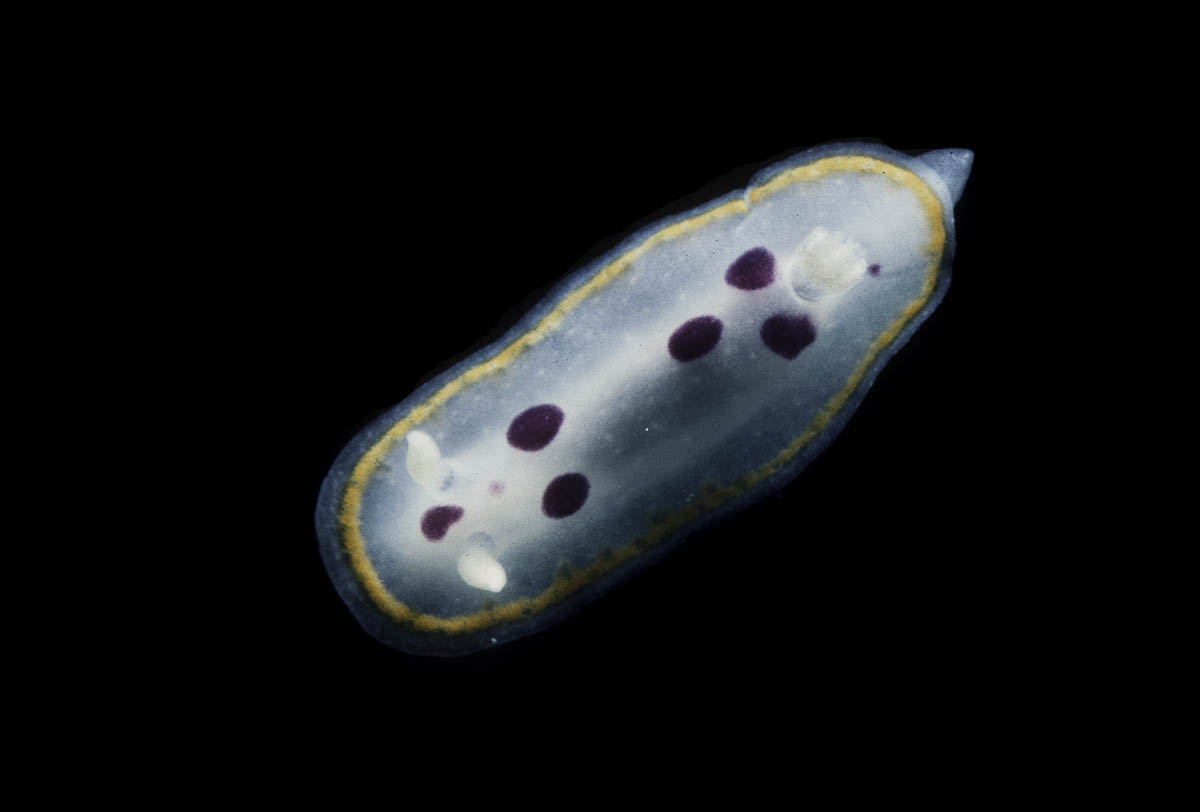
- The nudibranch Goniobranchus tumuliferus, Mirs Bay, Hong Kong.

Scientific classification
- Kingdom: Animalia
- Phylum: Mollusca
- Class: Gastropoda
- Order: Nudibranchia
- Family: Chromodorididae
- Genus: Goniobranchus
- Species: G. tumuliferus

Binomial name
- Goniobranchus tumuliferus (Collingwood, 1881)

Synonyms
- Chromodoris shirarae (Baba, 1953); Chromodoris tumulifera Collingwood, 1881 (basionym); Glossodoris shirarae Baba, 1953; Glossodoris tumulifera (Collinwood, 1881)

= Goniobranchus tumuliferus =

Species of gastropod

Goniobranchus tumuliferus is a species of colourful sea slug, a dorid nudibranch, a marine gastropod mollusc in the family Chromodorididae.

== Distribution ==
This species was described from Slut Island, Haitan Straits, China. Additional specimens were found by Collingwood at Labuan, Borneo. It has been reported from Thailand, Singapore, Japan, Hong Kong, Indonesia, Fiji and New Caledonia.

== Description ==
Chromodoris tumuliferus is a chromodorid nudibranch with a translucent white mantle and large, carmine-red spots. There is a submarginal line at edge of the mantle which is yellow, either continuous or broken into yellow blotches, with a translucent or white extreme edge. In this outer margin there may be more red blotches or an almost continuous red margin. The wide distribution and variable colour pattern suggest a possible species complex. This species was transferred from Chromodoris to Goniobranchus on molecular (DNA) evidence. It is very similar in appearance to Goniobranchus kitae but that species has small white spots on the gills and rhinophores.
