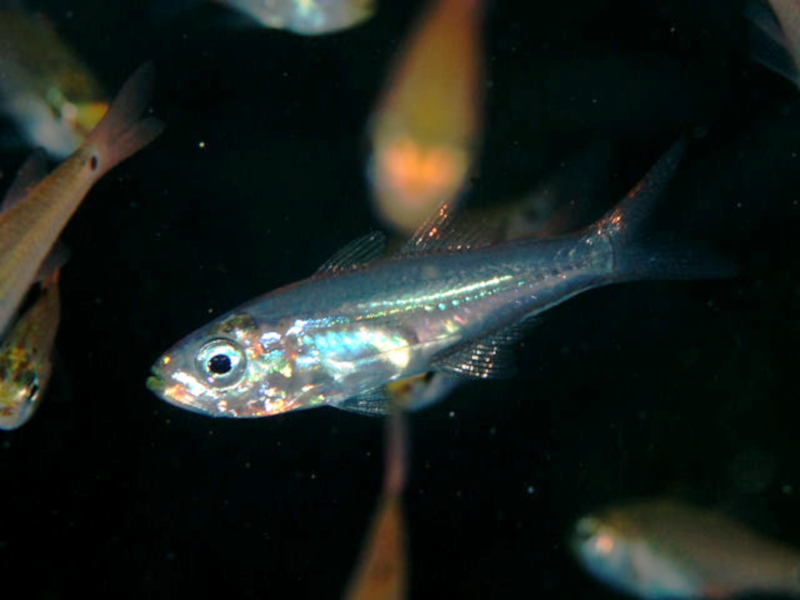
- Rhabdamia gracilis

Scientific classification
- Domain: Eukaryota
- Kingdom: Animalia
- Phylum: Chordata
- Class: Actinopterygii
- Order: Gobiiformes
- Family: Apogonidae
- Subfamily: Apogoninae
- Genus: Rhabdamia; M. C. W. Weber, 1909

= Rhabdamia =

Genus of fishes

Rhabdamia is a genus of cardinalfishes native to the Indian and Pacific Oceans.

== Species ==
The recognized species in this genus are:

- Rhabdamia clupeiformis M. C. W. Weber, 1909
- Rhabdamia gracilis (Bleeker, 1856) (luminous cardinalfish)
- Rhabdamia nigrimentum (J. L. B. Smith, 1961)
- Rhabdamia nuda (Regan, 1905)
- Rhabdamia spilota G. R. Allen & Kuiter, 1994 (Indonesian doubles cardinalfish)
