= Anna Weber-van Bosse =

Dutch phycologist (1852–1942)

- Anne Antoinette van Bosse
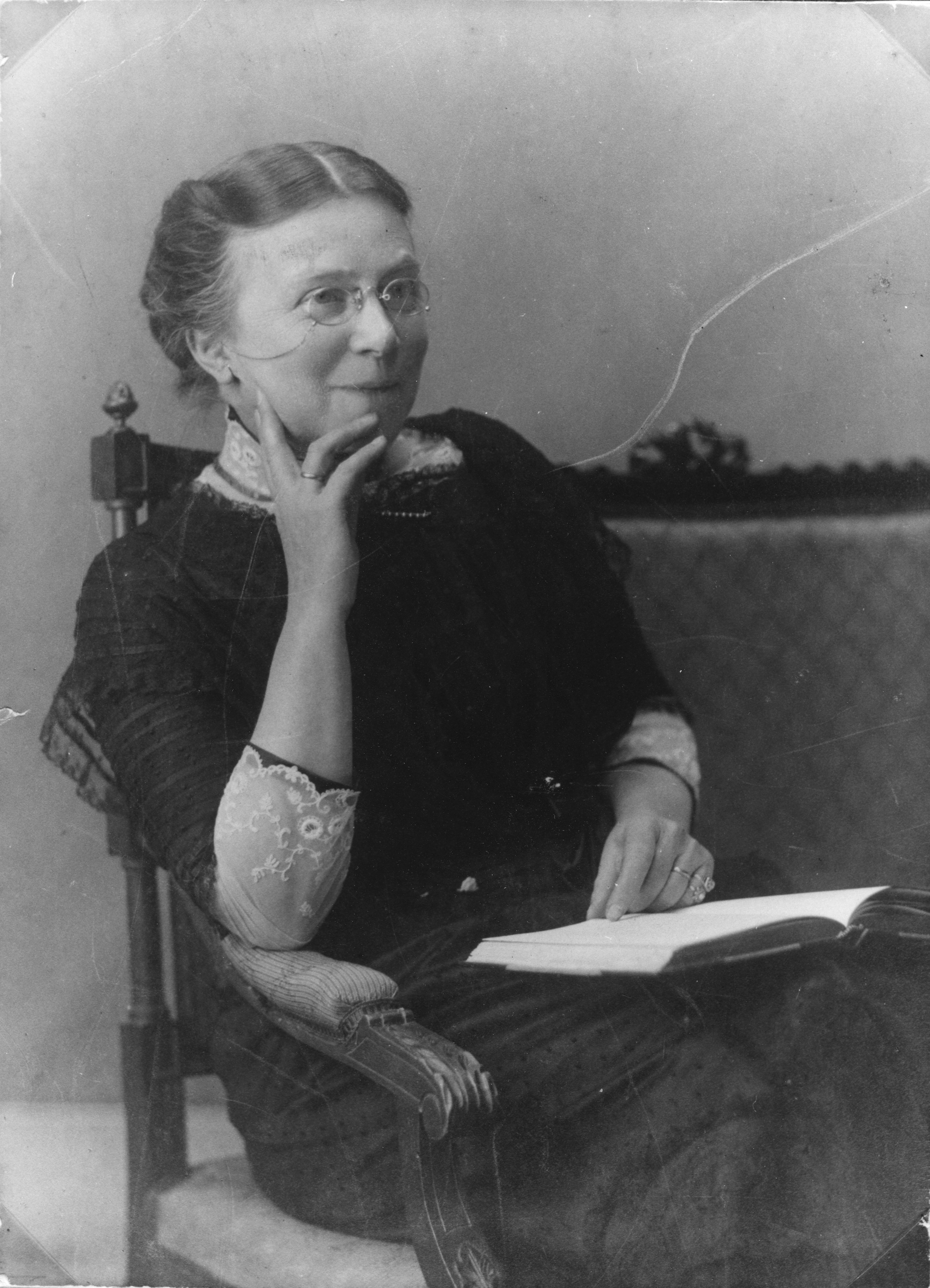
- Born: 27 March 1852; Amsterdam
- Died: 29 October 1942 (aged 90); Eerbeek
- Citizenship: Netherlands
- Education: University of Amsterdam
- Spouse: Max Carl Wilhelm Weber
- Scientific career
- Fields: Phycology, Marine biology
- Author abbrev. (botany): Weber-van Bosse

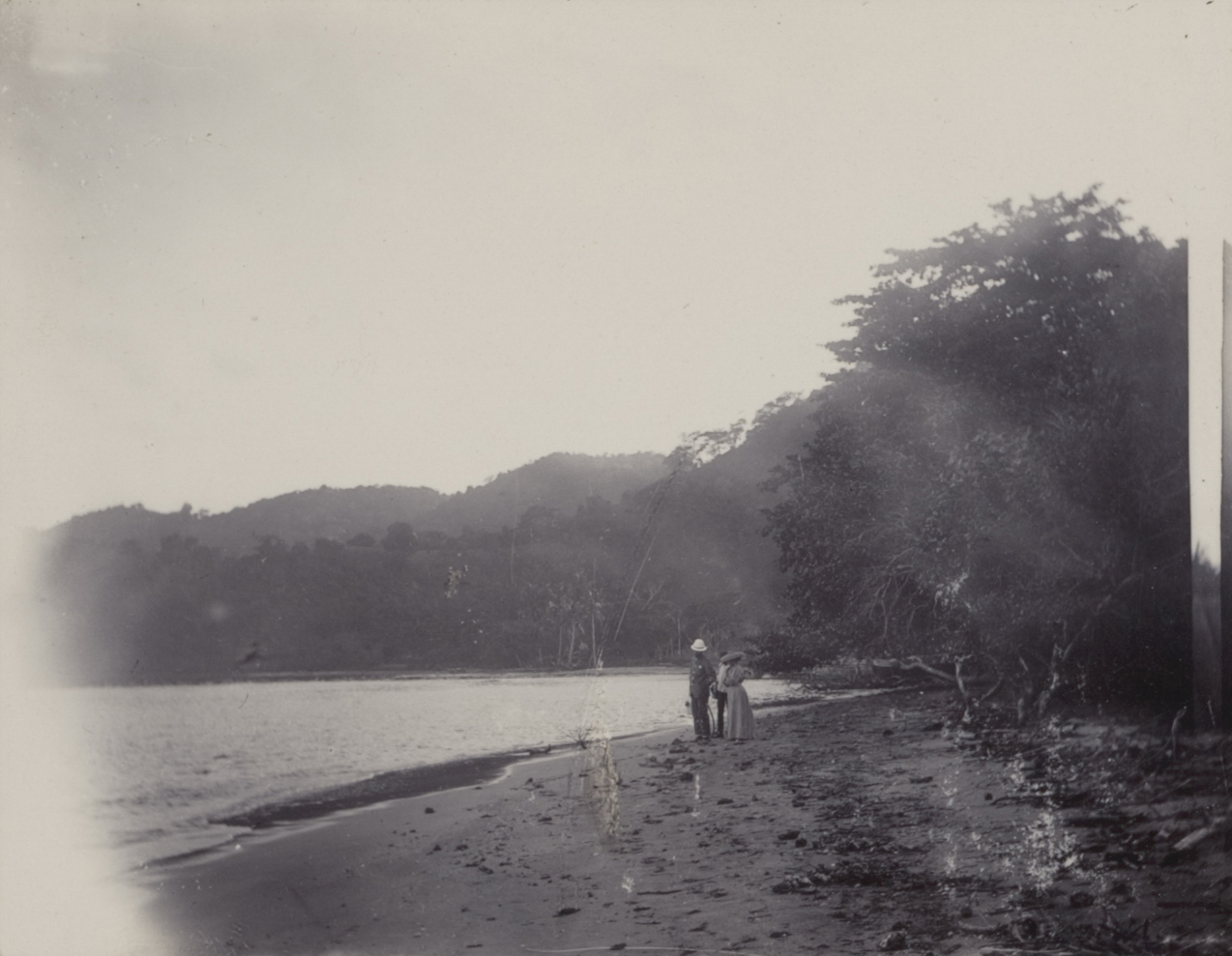
1899-1900 Siboga expedition

Anna Antoinette Weber-van Bosse (27 March 1852 – 29 October 1942) was a Dutch phycologist, specializing in marine algae.

== Life ==
Her interest in botany and zoology started at a young age, inspired by regular trips to the Amsterdam zoo. She attended the University of Amsterdam in 1880, where she was made to do her laboratory work in a room separate from the male students.

Some of her greatest work comes from the Siboga Expedition, considered the most important expedition for marine phycology in the western Pacific for the nineteenth century. She ventured with her husband, Max Weber. These travels brought about numerous discoveries, including entire new genera of algae, such as Periphykon, Exophyllum, and Microphyllum. Much of her discoveries from this trip are documented in her monograph Corallinaceae (1904), and her four-volume Liste des algues du Siboga (1913-1928).

Some of her discoveries came during earlier expeditions to northern Norway and the East Indies. She discovered the genus Phytophysa and a form of symbiosis between algae and sponges before she left for Siboga.

Much of her later work was done in her small home laboratory Huis Eerbeek, where several botanists would visit for consultation. Outside of marine biology, she worked with community child-care centers in Amsterdam.

She received several awards for her work, including one of the country's highest honors, the Chevalier de l'ordre d'Orange-Nassau, and an honorary doctorate from the University of Utrecht. The bird species Dicaeum annae was named in her honour. She died on October 29, 1942, at the age of 90.

An excerpt from Dr. Weber-van Bosse's The Corallinaceae of the Siboga - expedition:

“The Siboga had vainly tried to find a good anchorage on the east-side of Saleyer: the night advanced rapidly and therefore Commander Tydeman resolved to anchor for the night on the above named coral bank, where he was sure to find from 8—10 m. water. How great was our astonishment the next morning when coming on deck, we saw a distinct red colour at the bottom of the sea regularly interrupted by narrow white bands. It was no coral bank on which we were lying but an enormous bank of Lithothamnia. That gave a red colour to the bottom of the sea,” (Page 6). Published 1904.

== Gallery ==
Images of Dr. Weber-van Bosse's Siboga expedition (1899-1900).

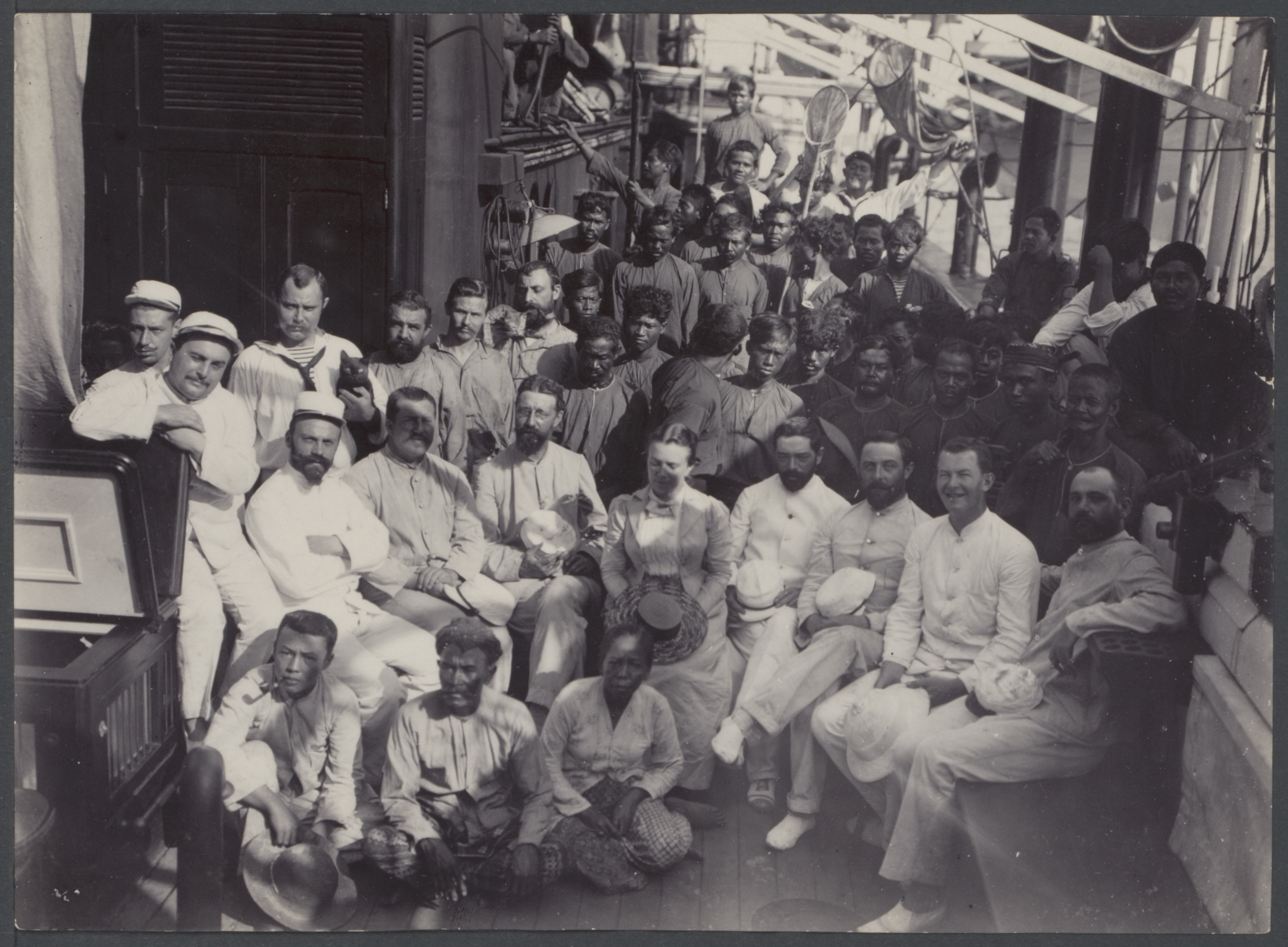

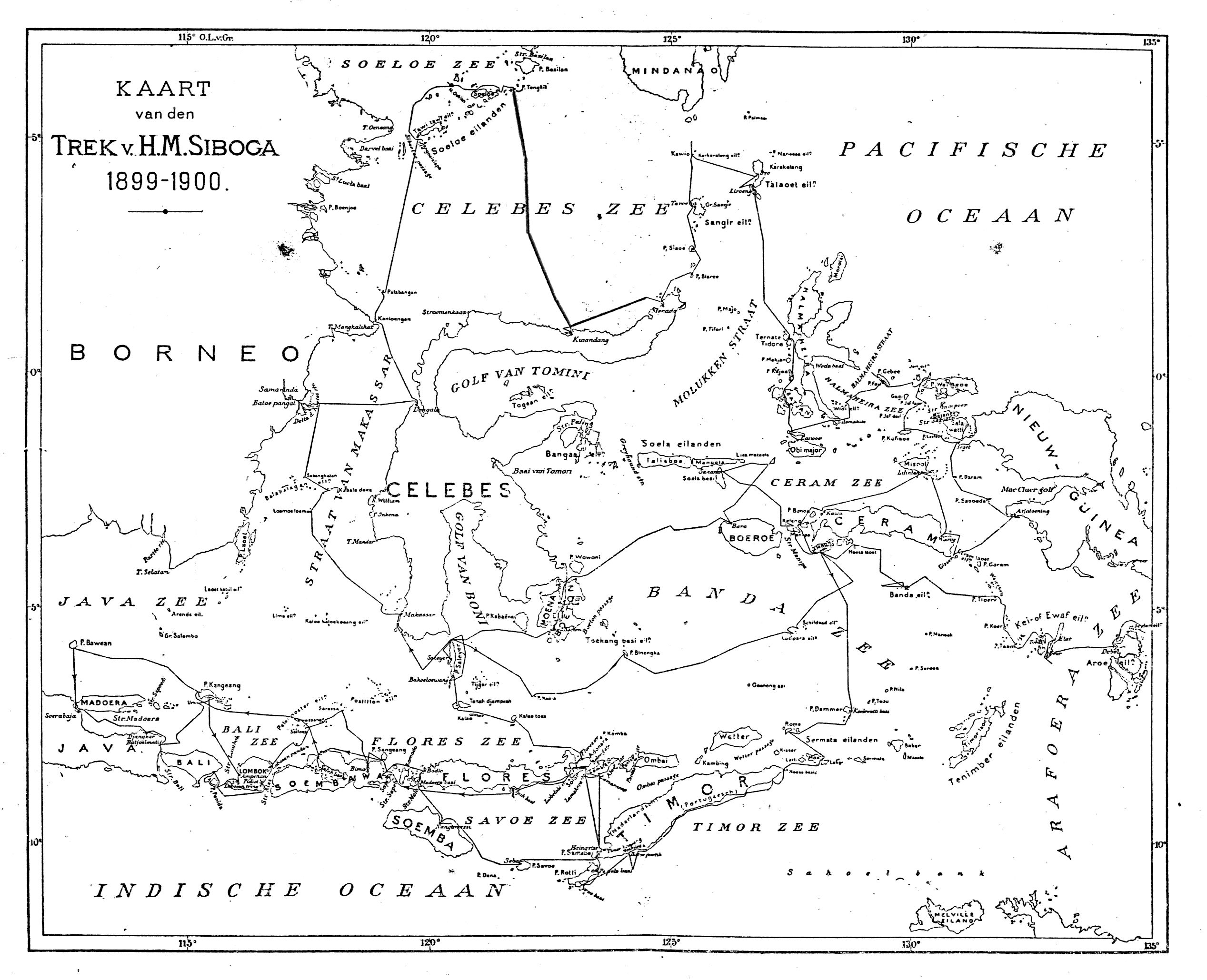
Route of the Siboga Expedition.

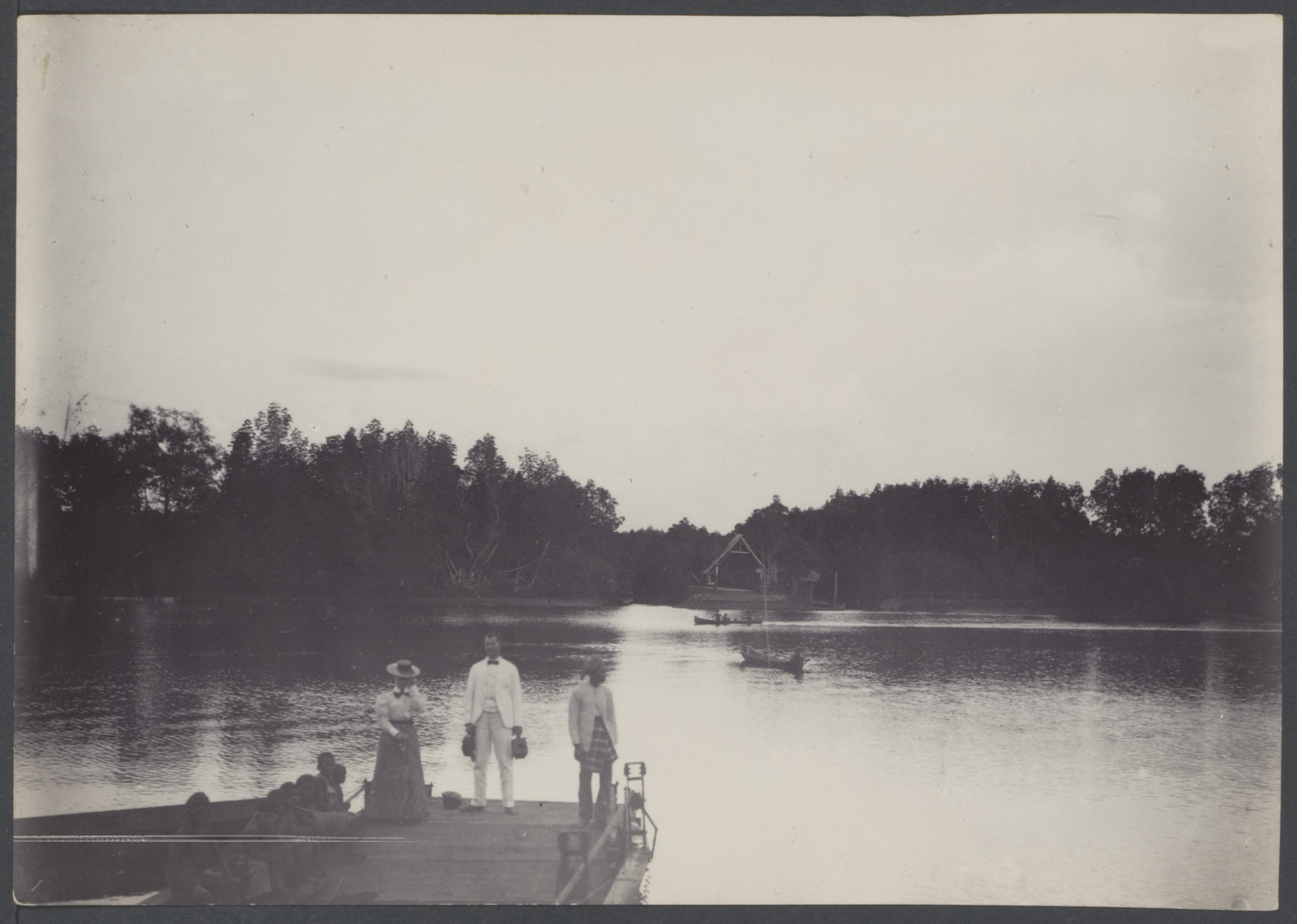

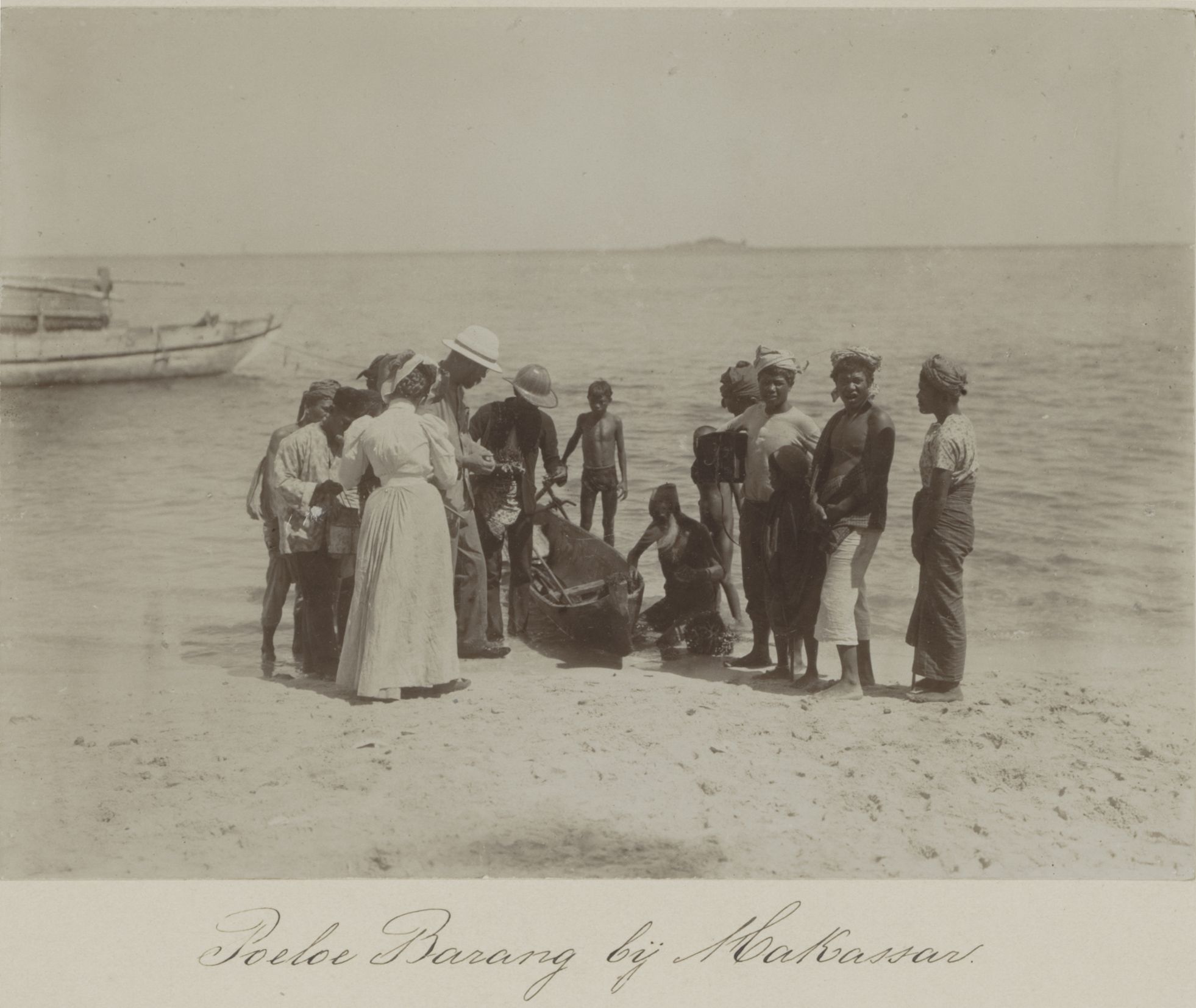

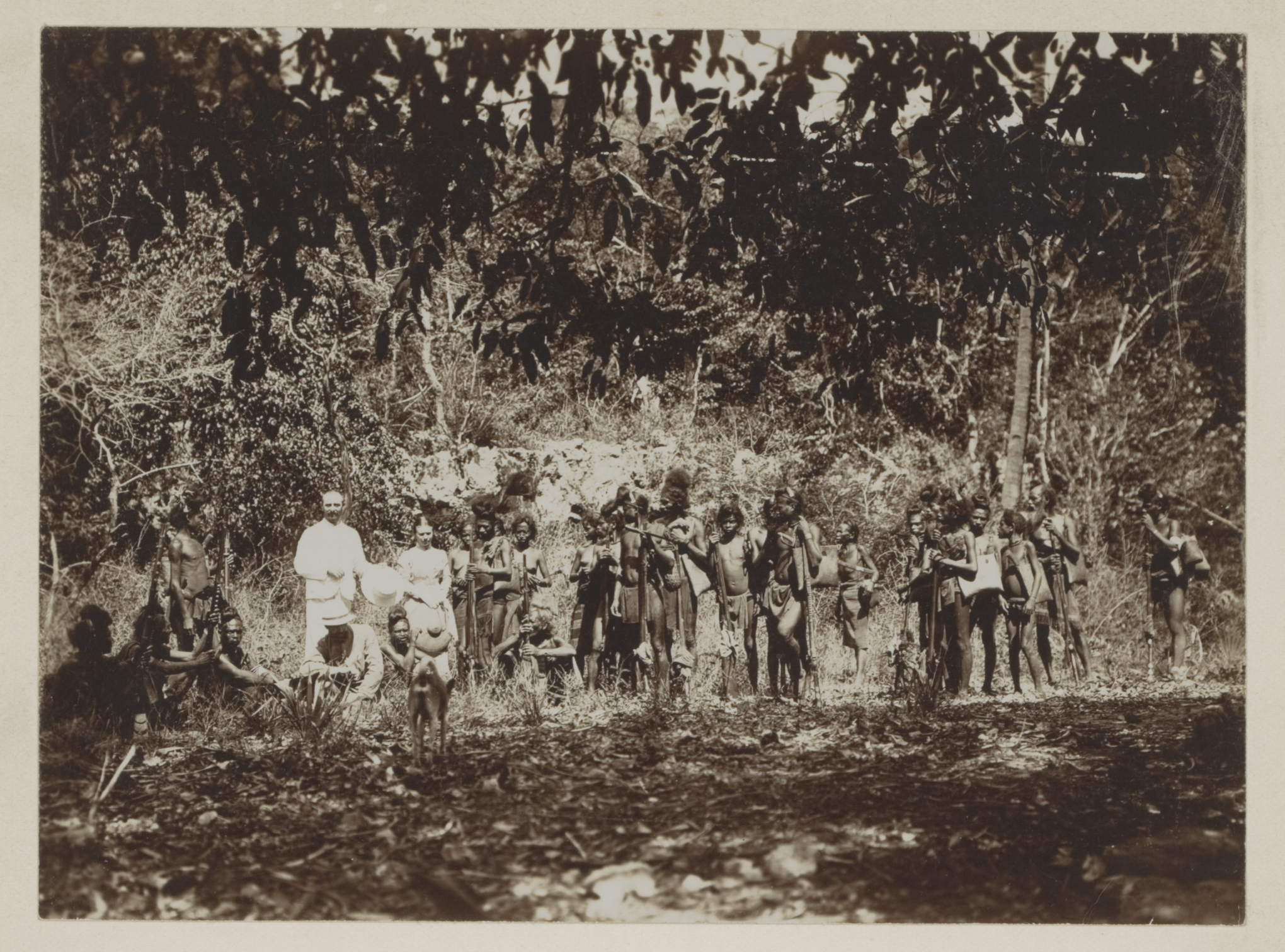

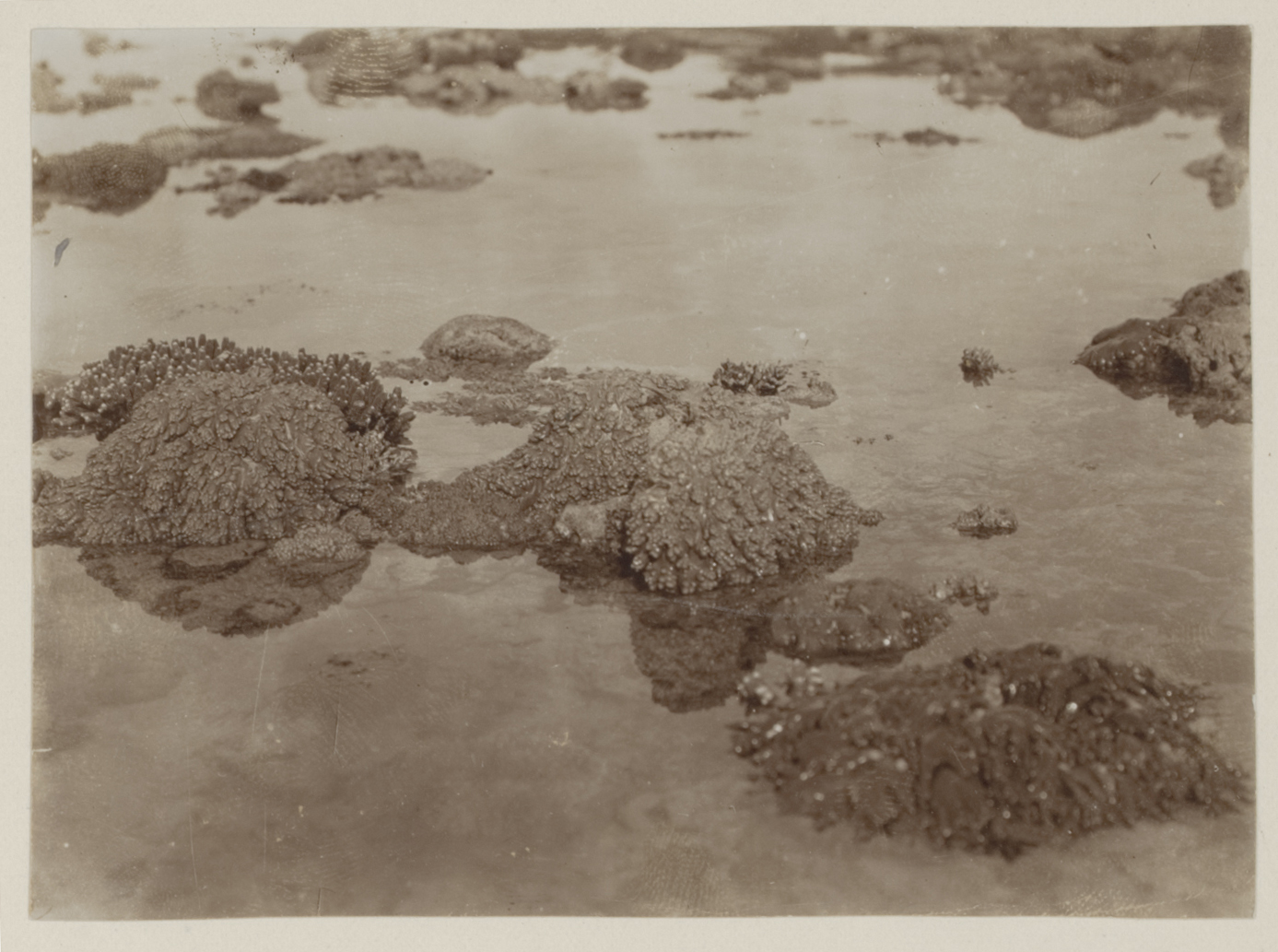

== Selected publications ==
1. The Corallinaceae of the Siboga-expedition, Weber-van Bosse, A. (Anna), - Fosalie, Mikal Hegġelund - 1904
