= Fritschiella =

Scientific classification
- Kingdom: Plantae
- Division: Chlorophyta
- Class: Chlorophyceae
- Order: Chaetophorales
- Family: Fritschiellaceae
- Genus: Fritschiella; Iyengar, 1932

Type species
- Fritschiella tuberosa Iyengar

Species
- See text

Genus of algae

Fritschiella is a genus of green algae in the family Fritschiellaceae. There are three species: the type species F. tuberosa, F. simplex and a new freshwater species from China, F. aquatilis.

The genus name of Fritschiella is in honour of Felix Eugen Fritsch (1879–1954), who was a British biologist.

The genus was circumscribed by M. O. P. Iyengar in New Phytol. Vol.31 on page 335 in 1932.

== Description ==
The thalli of Fritschiella consists of cells growing in and out of the soil. It has colorless, rhizoidal filaments which penetrate the soil. Below ground, there is a prostrate system of crowded, irregularly rounded clusters of small cells. Eventually, arising from the prostrate system, an erect system of irregularly branched filaments develops, ending in conical tips. Both cell types are uninucleate and have a parietal chloroplast with several pyrenoids.

Reproduction occurs in the subterranean, prostrate filaments, and involves the production of three types of zoospores: quadriflagellate micro- and macrozoospores, and biflagellate microzoospores. Sexual reproduction has also been observed, and is isogamous with biflagellate gametes.

== Ecology ==
Fritschiella tuberosa occurs in clusters in moist soil or silt, particularly those which are temporarily flooded or wet from rainwater. When the soil is moist, Fritschiella grows rapidly. When conditions become dry and unfavorable, the erect portion withers away, leaving the underground prostrate system.

== Accepted species ==
- Fritschiella aquatilis H.Su, J.Feng, J.Lv, Q.Liu, F.Nan & S.Xie, 2019
- Fritschiella simplex Aziz & Islam, 1962
- Fritschiella tuberosa M.O.P.Iyengar, 1932
