= William West Jr =

English botanist (1875–1901)

William West Jr ARCS
- Born: 11 February 1875; Bradford, West Riding of Yorkshire, England
- Died: 14 September 1901 (aged 26); Muzaffarpur, Bihar, India
- Education: St John's College, Cambridge
- Father: William West (botanist)
- Relatives: George Stephen West (brother)
- Scientific career
- Fields: Botany
- Workplaces: British Museum of Natural History
- Author abbrev. (botany): W. West

William West Jr, ARCS, (11 February 1875 – 14 September 1901) was an English botanist. He was the elder son of the botanist William West, and the brother of George Stephen West. West assisted his father in fieldwork. He wrote papers on flowering plants and phycology for various journals. His official botanical author-abbreviation was W. West, although his authorship in journals was cited as W. West Jun.

West showed great promise in his youth, gaining a scholarship to Bradford Technical College at age 10. At age 14 he won a Royal Exhibition to attend the Royal College of Science, where his achievements in botany won him the Forbes Medal. At age 16 he gained a scholarship to St John's College, Cambridge.

He travelled to India to begin a career in which it was hoped that he might discover ways to identify and control fungoid diseases which were attacking indigo plants, which were farmed for commercial dyes. Within three weeks of his arrival in the country, he had died of cholera at the age of 26.

== Background ==
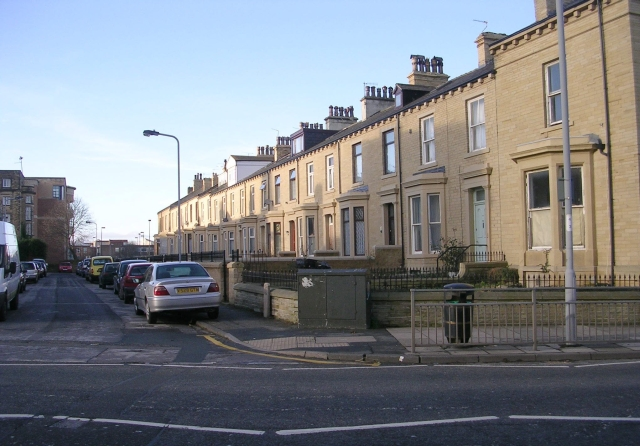
West's home was at the far end of Woodville Terrace, on the right

William West, born in Bradford on 11 February 1875, was the first son of the botanist William West of Bradford, West Riding of Yorkshire, England. His brother was the botanist George Stephen West. West's and his father's home address was 26 Woodville Terrace, Bradford.

West's interest in botany began early. W.D. Roebuck wrote, "How familiar he was with abstruse works, such as the Nautical Almanack, systematic botanical works etc., when but a very small boy. His educational career is only to be described as brilliant". The Bradford Observer reported:

Mr West's career [was] one of much brilliancy and promise. His earliest lessons were taken under the tuition of his father, and from the tender years he displayed remarkable precocity. At ten years of age, on his own initiative and without the knowledge of his parents, he sat for examination and won a scholarship at the Bradford Technical College, and he was on admission one of the youngest students ever admitted. Here he received a grounding of elementary science, and at the end of four years he went up to the Royal College of Science in London, where his progress was also remarkable, and he secured the Forbes Medal for botany, being at the head of the College in this subject, though he was one of the youngest students.

At Bradford Technical College in 1887, at the age of 12, West passed examinations in inorganic chemistry, and magnetism and electricity, both at "advanced stage, first class". "His botanical acumen was so well developed that at the early age of 14 he was able to set the British Museum curators right as to the determination of an obscure Elatine displayed in the public galleries". In that same year of 1889, he won a Royal Exhibition to attend the Royal College of Science.

A national scholarship entitle[d] the holder to free admission to lectures, laboratories and instruction free of all cost during the teaching terms for three years, at either the Normal School of Science and Royal College of Mines, London, or the Royal College of Science, Dublin, at the option of the holder, with £80 (equivalent to £8,888 in 2025) a year for maintenance and travelling expenses in addition.

West gained a foundation scholarship, when only sixteen years old, to St John's College, Cambridge, and began his studies there at age seventeen. At nineteen years old he gained the first half of his Natural Science Tripos with first class honours. Due to illness, the second part of his Tripos was delayed until four years after he first went up to Cambridge. The delays and omissions in his training meant that he gained second-class honours instead of a first. Nevertheless he received his BA with honours. "Both at the Royal College of Science and at Cambridge he gave much attention to biology, and he was from an early age a very accomplished botanist".

== Career ==
For a while, West was a science demonstrator at Cambridge. His second appointment was as an assistant in the herbarium in the department of botany of the British Museum of Natural History, London. He was employed there for two years, between Michaelmas 1890 to August 1892, "revising and incorporating the Fresh-Water Algae of Hassal's Herbarium, and of numerous published sets. (Note: Hassall's Herbarium was an actual herbarium (not a publication) consisting of 883 specimens. It was donated by his widow to the British Museum of Natural History in 1894. (Source: Jstor: Global Plants)) He supplied the department with many hundreds of microscope slides of fresh-water Algae". He also "went botanising" with his father, assisting him in his fieldwork. (Note: "Botanising" in this context is archaic slang for botany fieldwork)

== Publications ==
West was 16 years old when he published his first note in a scientific journal. The subject matter of his publications in The Naturalist was the British flowering plants, "which gained for him considerable scientific reputation". He also published papers in The Journal of Botany: "One treated of some new species of algae which he described from Plankton collected in the Atlantic; another written jointly with Dr A.B. Rendle described a new species of Pithophora; and another dealt extensively with the plants of Cambridge".

=== Notes and papers ===
- West, William Jnr (1891). "Note – botany: Malham Plants. Cochlearia anglica, Carduus acaulis and Cuscuta europaea at Malham". The Naturalist. 16 (August 1891): 241.
- West, William Jnr (1891). "Agrimonia odorata added to the West Yorkshire Flora". The Naturalist. 16 (October 1891): 297.
- West, William Jnr (1892). "Andromeda polifolia in West Yorkshire". The Naturalist. 17 (October 1892): 300.
- West, William Jnr (1895). "Another Teesdale locality for Equisetum pratense Ehrh". The Naturalist. 20 (September 1895): 270.
- West, William Jnr (1895). "Some additional West Riding plant-localities". The Naturalist. 20 (December 1895): 333.
- West, William Jnr (1898). "Charles Cardale Babington: A review of Prof. Babington's Memorials Journal and Correspondence". The Naturalist. 23 (June 1898): 173–176.
- West, William Jnr (1898). "Notes on Cambridgeshire plants". Journal of Botany, British and Foreign. 36: 246–259.
- West, William Jnr (1899). "Galium sylvestre Poll. in Surrey". Journal of Botany, British and Foreign. 37: 273.
- West, William Jnr (1899). "Some Oscillarioideae from the plankton". Journal of Botany, British and Foreign. 37: 337.

=== Records ===
- "An early record (Tadcaster 1834) for Cephalanthera ensifolia (April 1897)".

== Death and obituaries ==
West's position in the herbarium of the British Museum of Natural History was a temporary one so, having left England on 8 August 1901 on the SS Persia, he arrived at Bombay on 23 August, attracted by a promise of work which might lead to a more permanent position. He was to be "a biologist to the Bihar Indigo Planters' Association", and the Indigo Improvement Syndicate, assisting the agricultural chemist E.A. Hancock. He travelled from Bombay to Calcutta to visit a Cambridge acquaintance and "reporter on economic products", Isaac Henry Burkill. From there he returned to Bombay, then arrived at Muzaffarpur on 27 August to start work. Being "in thoroughly good health", he wrote letters home. Within three weeks of arriving in India he died of cholera on 14 September 1901 at age 26 years. His family received the news via cablegram on 17 September. The Englishman's Overland Mail reported: "There is something very tragic in the sudden close of a career whose opening chapters were both interesting and brilliant". The Bradford Observer said:

The work which lay before [West] in India in the study of the fungoid diseases which attack the indigo and other plants of commercial value promised ample opportunities of adding to that reputation. But it was not in science alone that he excelled, and it was in literature that his friends prophesied for him a brilliant future; hopes which are bitterly disappointed.

William Denison Roebuck commented in The Naturalist:

[West's] personal characteristics included not only extreme accuracy and wide grasp, and the extraordinary retentive memory which so greatly facilitated his botanical studies, but a most amiable and lovable disposition which endeared him to all who had the privilege of knowing him, and who consequently feel deeply and grievously the weight of the affliction which the untimely close of his career brings upon us".

The Journal of Botany, British and Foreign said:

[West] from his earliest years displayed remarkable precocity ... From a very early age, under the tuition of his father, he devoted much attention to botany ... West was a man of general accomplishments; he was interested in music and the drama, and his friends anticipated for him a brilliant literary career.
