= William West (botanist) =

English botanist

William West FLS
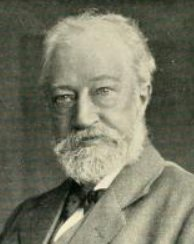
- William West
- Born: 22 February 1848; Leeds, West Riding of Yorkshire, England
- Died: 14 May 1914 (aged 66); Bradford, West Riding of Yorkshire, England
- Resting place: Scholemoor Cemetery, Bradford
- Children: George Stephen West
- Scientific career
- Fields: Pharmacology; microscopy; botany; freshwater algae; ecology of cryptogams; phytoplankton of rivers and lakes
- Institutions: Bradford Technical College
- Author abbrev. (botany): West, 1848–1914

Signature
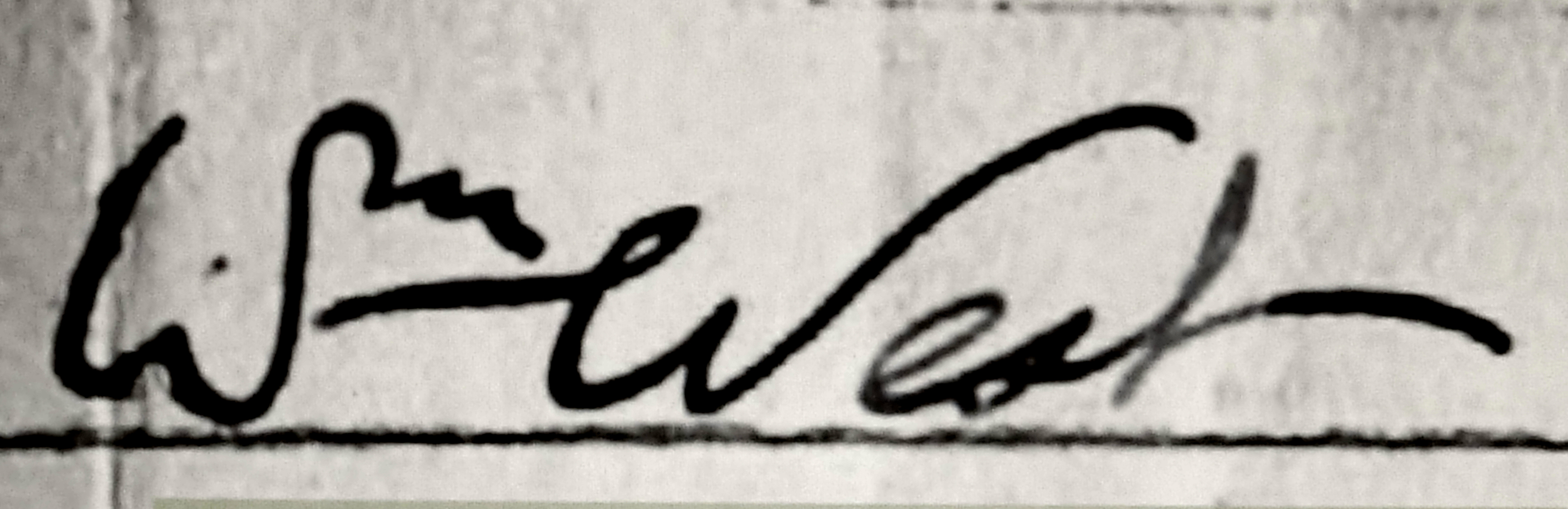

William West, FLS (22 February 1848 – 14 May 1914) was an English pharmacist, botanist, microscopist and writer, particularly noted for his studies of freshwater algae. His sons, both botanists, were William West Jr with whom he did fieldwork, and George Stephen West with whom West co-wrote botanical publications for more than 20 years.

West was born in Leeds in the West Riding of Yorkshire. He was the son of a cloth-dresser and a dressmaker, and his training as a pharmacist was probably via an apprenticeship in a chemist shop, which would have involved the study of plants. For most of his life, West ran his own pharmacy in Bradford. He was self-trained in botany, and for some years he ran a microscopy partnership with Jean Claudius Tempère, selling slides.

In 1881 West published his first academic paper, "Bryological Notes". For much of his writing career, he collaborated with his son George Stephen, writing papers for journals, and publishing books. Research for that work involved travelling all over the British Isles. Bradford Technical College hired him as a biology lecturer, and he held that position until his retirement. He was a Fellow of the Linnean Society of London, a president of the Yorkshire Naturalists' Union, and a member of the British Association.

West married and had three children. He was buried in Scholemoor Cemetery, Bradford, with many students and friends following his funeral cortège.

== Background ==
West's father was George West (Leeds c.1815 – Bradford 1889), a cloth dresser. His mother was dressmaker Mary Ann Rodgers (Leeds c.1815 – Leeds March 1877). They married on 25 January 1846 at Leeds Parish Church (St Peter). (Note: Marriages Mar 1846 West George and Rodgers Mary Ann Leeds XXIII 347, Deaths Mar 1877 West Mary Ann 62 Leeds 9b 360, Deaths Dec 1889 West George 74 Bradford, Y. 9b 135) The family was living at 8 Delph Terrace, Leeds, between 1851 and 1861. William West was born on 22 February 1848 near Woodhouse Moor in Leeds. He was the second of four siblings; at the age of 13 he was an errand boy. By 1871 the family had moved next door, to 9 Delph Terrace, and West, at age 23, was describing himself as a chemist and druggist. (Note: West may have served an apprenticeship as a pharmacist in a chemist shop from age 14 to 21 (1862–1869), since no evidence of higher education has so far been found, and university education would have been too expensive for his working-class parents.) In 1872 he moved to Bradford. West's mother Mary died in March 1877, and was buried on 20 March in the churchyard of St Mark, Woodhouse, Leeds. In 1881 the Census finds the family living at 14 Sherborne Road, Little Horton, Bradford. West describes himself as a master chemist and druggist, employing two men, including West's widowed father George as a chemist's assistant. (Note: In the 19th century, "master" meant a skilled person who employed people and trained apprentices. It did not imply an academic qualification, professional association, or award.)

In 1874, West married his Woodhouse Moor neighbour Hannah Wainwright (Leeds 1851 – Leeds 9 March 1904), (Note: Hannah West is buried in Scholemoor Cemetery, Bradford, and shares a black gravestone with her husband.) and they had two sons: William (1875–1901) and George Stephen (1876–1919); and a daughter May, an artist (born 1881). (Note: Births Mar 1881 West May Bradford, Y. 9b 159) The 1891 Census finds William still running the chemist shop, living with Hannah and two of their children at 15 Little Horton Lane, Bradford. Both sons were botanists, but William died in India, aged 26 years.

West suffered from asthma, and ultimately died of heart failure on 14 May 1914 in Bradford. (Note: There is an image of William and Hannah West's gravestone here.) He was buried in Scholemoor Cemetery, Bradford, followed by "a great number of his old students and his old friends". His naturalist colleague and Woodhouse Moor neighbour William Denison Roebuck (1851–1919) said of him:

He was a man of warm enthusiasms, with a singular charm of manner and a quiet vein of genial humour, and those who, with the present writer, have been on most intimate terms with him for nearly forty years, can best appreciate what manner of man he was, and feel the greatness of the loss which they have sustained by his [death].

== Career ==
=== Pharmacy and lecturing ===
West studied pharmacy, probably via an apprenticeship; his training involved plant identification and the use of the microscope. He was registered as a pharmacist on 16 November 1870. In 1872, he moved from Leeds to Bradford and established his pharmacy business at 15 Horton Lane. The Bradford Weekly Telegraph said that West was still a pharmacist and druggist at the time of his death, although another source states that he ran the shop until 1899. Although qualified in pharmacy, Bradford Technical College hired West as a lecturer in botany, and then in biology, pharmacology and bacteriology in 1886. "He was remarkably successful and able as a teacher, gaining the respect and affection of his students to an extraordinary degree". He continued to teach at Bradford Technical College for the rest of his life, still describing himself as a lecturer in biology at the Municipal Technical College in 1911.

=== Plant-collecting and microscopy ===
West was collecting and exchanging plants via the publication, Hardwicke's Science-Gossip, by 1877. In June 1878 he published an article in the magazine, giving advice on "maintaining aquaria for microorganisms". By 1879 he had made microscope slides for exchange. The microscopist Jean Claudius Tempère (1847–1926), who was then living in England, was also offering slides, and by 1883 the two men had formed a "slide-making partnership" under the commercial name S. Louis. They offered mounting media such as fixing cement, and unmounted specimens, besides completed slides. The trading partnership S. Louis continued until at least 1901. In preparation for his publications, West "went botanising" with his son William Jr, who assisted him in his fieldwork. (Note: "Botanising" in this context is archaic slang for botany fieldwork)

=== Botanical study and publishing ===
At first, from 1878 to 1887, West published papers on roses, lichens and mosses. He also contributed to Lees' Flora of Yorkshire. "[At this time] he was an all-round botanist with a wide and accurate knowledge of all the groups both of flowering and flowerless plants, being gifted with a powerful and retentive memory and remarkable powers of observation". He published numerous notes during this time, dealing with such subjects as "Mosses" (1878), the "Autumn Flora of Whernside" (1879), "The Roses of Towton Battlefield" (1879), "Buckinghamshire Lichens" (1880), "A February Stroll Near Baildon" (1881), "The Principal Plants of Malham" (1883) and "The Plants of the Bradford District" (1886).

After that, West collaborated with his son George Stephen West on publications on the subject of phycology, especially freshwater algae. "The two Wests became experts in this field – their studies leading to A Monograph of the British Desmidiaceae". The first volume of that series was promptly purchased in October 1904 by Thomas W. Hand, city librarian for Leeds Public Free Libraries, and catalogued as no. 589.61. W. Denison Roebuck commented:

The practical self-training of the father and the parental and academic training of the son, based upon a combination of practical field-work and an appreciation of specific and varietal differentiation with a capacity for broad and sound generalization, began to yield fruit in no small degree. Theirs was no mere local study, the whole world was now their sphere of investigation, and the command of the complete literature of their subject and of innumerable gatherings from almost all parts of the globe, with the willing co-operation of European and American workers, enabled the two Wests to establish themselves among the foremost students of their subject.

Roebuck described the man in his capacity as a botanist:

He was a man of extraordinarily wide and varied range of information. He had a competent knowledge of all branches of field botany, and his attainments in plant physiology and morphology showed that, had he been specially interested in those branches of study, he would have made his mark as an original investigator. But it was as a student of the freshwater algae, and especially of the Desmids that he obtained his world-wide reputation. In this department he was one of the foremost men of his time, and the numerous papers and memoirs contributed to various journals and to the Transactions and Proceedings of learned societies testify to his unflagging energy and zeal in the pursuit of his favourite study. As a systematist he has been for many years recognised as an authority on the freshwater algae, and he has also made valuable contributions, in numerous memoirs, to our knowledge of their distribution and biological relationships.

In his latter years, West and his son G.S. West took an interest in the ecology of cryptogams. Roebuck enthused about this too:

William West's remarkable knowledge about cryptogamic plants of all kinds and of their conditions of growth made him a unique personality in Britain, probably in Europe. He was an ecologist long before the term itself was coined, always fully conscious of the importance of the common and dominant forms. The algological investigations which were now his main line of research were systematically and diligently carried on. Holidays were utilized to the full for visiting all parts of the British Islands, especially the outlying montane regions of Scotland and Ireland, North Wales and the English Lakes.

Many papers and memoirs were published in the Journal of Botany by West and his son G.S. West on the subject of cryptogamic plants in all parts of the British Isles. They were associated with a worldwide team of botanists who produced papers about cryptogams in many countries, and the Wests also produced papers on the basis of information sent to them from abroad.

However there was more to come, from the Wests: their study of the phytoplankton of rivers and lakes. "In this the two Wests were the pioneer British workers, and they took up the task in characteristically full and systematic fashion". Aided by grants, they carried out "detailed field work" around the British Isles during vacations from 1900 onwards. In 1909 they reported the progress of this work in the Proceedings of the Royal Society. This is what they discovered:

From a biological point of view the British Lakes are of great interest; the researches of the two Wests showing that the lake plankton of extreme Western Europe, and particularly of the British Islands, differs completely from that of Central Europe, being characterised by the presence and dominance of Desmids. Their observations showed that Desmid-plankton occurred only in rich Desmid-areas, and that these areas were directly correlated with montane areas, with heavy and persistent rainfall, and most important of all, with the presence of the oldest rocks, Archaean and the older Palaeozoic rock-formations; and their success in working out this new line of research has produced significant results which were a revelation and surprise to Continental observers".

=== Other contributions ===
West was secretary of the Yorkshire Naturalists' Union botanical section, then president of the Union in 1899, which was "a significant mark of the appreciation of the esteem in which he was held by his fellow Yorkshiremen ... West was one of the band of able naturalists who were instrumental in making it the powerful and successful instrument of local scientific research which it has been ever since". He was a member of the British Association and in 1900 served as secretary of its botanical section. He was a Fellow of the Linnean Society from 17 March 1887.

== Selected publications ==
=== Notes and papers ===
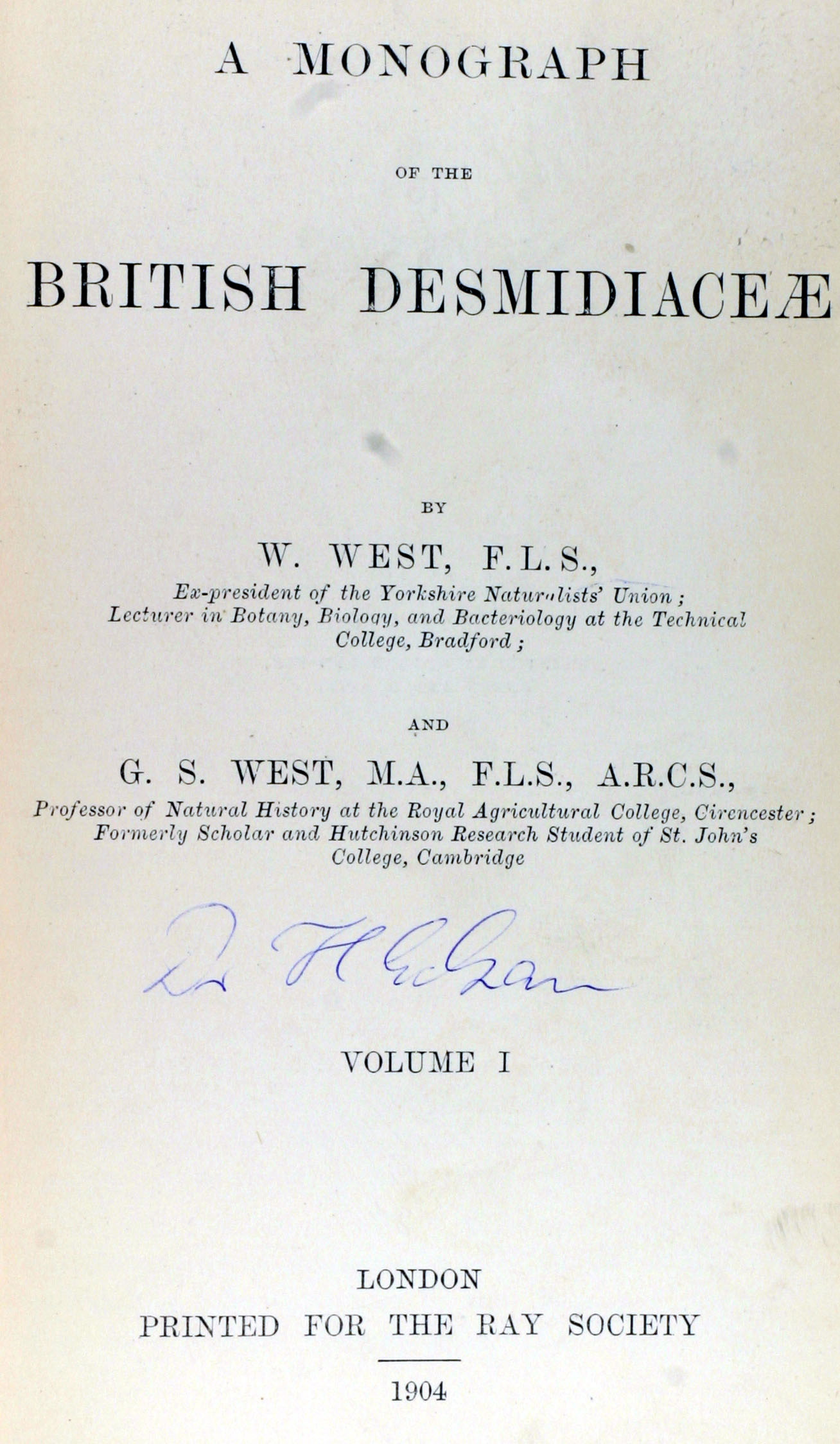
Title page of Monograph of the British Desmidiaceae (1904)

- West, William (1881). "Bryological Notes". (His first paper).
- West, William (1892). Roy, J. (ed.). "Algae of the English Lake District". Journal of Microscopy: 713–748.
- West, William (1892). "A contribution to the freshwater algae of west Ireland". Journal of the Linnean Society, Botany. 29 (199–200): 103–216. doi:10.1111/j.1095-8339.1892.tb02032.x.
- West, William; West, George Stephen (1896). Roy, J. (ed.). "On some new and interesting freshwater algae". Journal of Microscopy. 16: 149 et seq.
- West, William; West, George Stephen (1897). "Welwitsch's African freshwater algae". Journal of Botany, British and Foreign. 35: 1 et seq.
- West, William; West, George Stephen (1897). "The alga-flora of Yorkshire". The Naturalist. Yorkshire Naturalists' Union.
- West, William; West, George Stephen (1900). The Alga Flora of Yorkshire. (This was based on their 1897 paper in The Naturalist).
- West, William; West, George Stephen (1902). "A contribution to the freshwater algae of the north of Ireland". Transactions of the Royal Irish Academy. 32 (1): 1–100.
- West, William; West, George Stephen (March 1902). "Part III: A contribution to the freshwater algae of Ceylon". The Transactions of the Linnean Society of London. Series II, VI, Botany 1901–1905: 123–216.
- West, William; West, George Stephen (1903). "Notes on freshwater Algae". Journal of Botany, British and Foreign. III: 33 et seq.
- West, William; West, George Stephen (1906). "A comparative study of the plankton of some Irish Lakes". Transactions of the Royal Irish Academy. 33B: 70–116.
- West, William; West, George Stephen (1909). "The British freshwater phytoplankton, with special reference to the desmid-plankton and the distribution of British desmids". Proceedings of the Royal Society. 81B (547): 165–206. Bibcode:1909RSPSB..81..165W..
- West, William (1912). "Part 16. Fresh-Water Algae, with a Supplement of Marine Diatoms". Proceedings of the Royal Irish Academy, Section B. 31: 16.1 – 16.62. JSTOR 20516994.

=== Books ===
- West, William; West, George Stephen. A Monograph of the British Desmidiaceae, vols I-IV, (1904, 1905, 1908, 1912). London: The Ray Society.
- West, William; West, George Stephen; Carter-Montford, Nellie (1923). A Monograph of the British Desmidiacese, Vol.V. London: The Ray Society.

=== Reviews ===
- The Sheffield Daily Telegraph reported: "Part 25 of the Transactions of the Yorkshire Naturalists' Union has just been issued ... It contains the third instalment of the list of the known freshwater algae of the county, compiled by Messrs W. West and G.S. West. The fame of these two gentlemen as botanists needs no advertisement from us" (1901).
- The Salisbury and Winchester Journal reported that the Salisbury Microscopical Society was eagerly waiting for the third (1908) volume of the Monograph on the British Desmidiaceae, saying "the volume on British Desmidiaceae mentioned as being due for this year was not to hand yet" (1908).
- The Westminster Gazette commented: "Mr West was widely known in scientific circles for his work on the British Desmidiaceae undertaken in conjunction with his son Professor G.S. West, of Birmingham, and published by the Ray Society as one of their series of monographs. He was also an authority on the fresh-water algae, at which he worked extensively in Scotland. In these subjects he was a recognised expert; but he was no less an accomplished student of the great kingdom of biology in general" (1914).
