= Muriel Bristol =

English phycologist (1888–1950)

- Born: 21 April 1888; Croydon, Surrey, England
- Died: 15 March 1950 (aged 61); Bristol, Gloucestershire, England
- Other name: Blanche Muriel Bristol-Roach
- Known for: Subject of the "lady tasting tea experiment"
- Scientific career
- Fields: Phycology

Blanche Muriel Bristol (21 April 1888 – 15 March 1950) was a British phycologist who worked at Rothamsted Research (then Rothamsted Experimental Station) in 1919. Her research focused on the mechanisms by which algae acquire nutrients.

== Statistics and tea ==
One day at Rothamsted, Ronald Fisher offered Bristol a cup of hot tea that he had just drawn from an urn. Bristol declined it, saying that she preferred the flavour when the milk was poured into the cup before the tea. Fisher scoffed that the order of pouring could not affect the flavour. Bristol insisted that it did and that she could tell the difference. Overhearing this debate, William Roach said, "Let's test her."

Fisher and Roach hastily put together an experiment to test Bristol's ability to identify the order in which the two liquids were poured into several cups. At the conclusion of this experiment in which she correctly identified all eight, Roach proclaimed that "Bristol divined correctly more than enough of those cups into which tea had been poured first to prove her case".

This incident led Fisher to do important work in the design of statistically valid experiments based on the statistical significance of experimental results. He developed Fisher's exact test to assess the probabilities and statistical significance of experiments.

== Family life ==
Bristol was born on 21 April 1888, the daughter of Alfred Bristol, a commercial traveller, and Annie Eliza, née Davies. She studied botany and completed a PhD on algae at Birmingham, under the tutelage of George Stephen West. Bristol married William Roach in 1923. She died in Bristol on 15 March 1950 of ovarian cancer.

== Algae ==
The recipe for Bristol's Media was developed by her in 1919 which was later adapted by Bold in 1949. Her culture media and techniques are still used for the cultivation of species of green algae today.

The green algae species Chlamydomonas muriella is named after her and possibly the genus Muriella.

She published many papers into the field, some of which have been lost to time or lack of documentation. Many of her publications can be found as cited by Bold in his 1942 publication, The Cultivation of Algae:

- On a Malay form of Chlorococcum humicola (Nfi.g.) Rabenh. Journal of the Linnaean Society 44: 473--482. 1919. 54.
- On the retention of vitality by algae from old stored soils. New Phytologist 18: 92-107. 1919. 55. 56.
- Algae. In Russell: The microorganisms of the soil. 1923.
- On the alga-flora of some desiccated English soils: an important factor in soil biology. Annals of Botany 34: 35-80. 1920. 57.
- On the relation of certain soil algae to some soluble carbon compounds. Annals of Botany 40: 149-201. 1926. 58.
- On the carbon nutrition of some algae isolated from soil. Annals of Botany 41: 509-517. 1927. 59. 60.
- On the influence of light and of glucose on the growth of a soil alga. Annals of Botany 42: 317-345. 1928.
- Bodenalgen. In Aberhalden: Handbuch der biologischen Arbeitsmethoden, Abt. XI, Teil 3: 747-751, 811-821. 1928. 61.
- A critical enquiry into the alleged fixation of nitrogen by green algae. (with H. J. Page) Annals of Applied Biology 10: 378-408. 1923.
