= M. O. P. Iyengar =

Indian phycologist

Mandayam Osuri Parthasarathy Iyengar
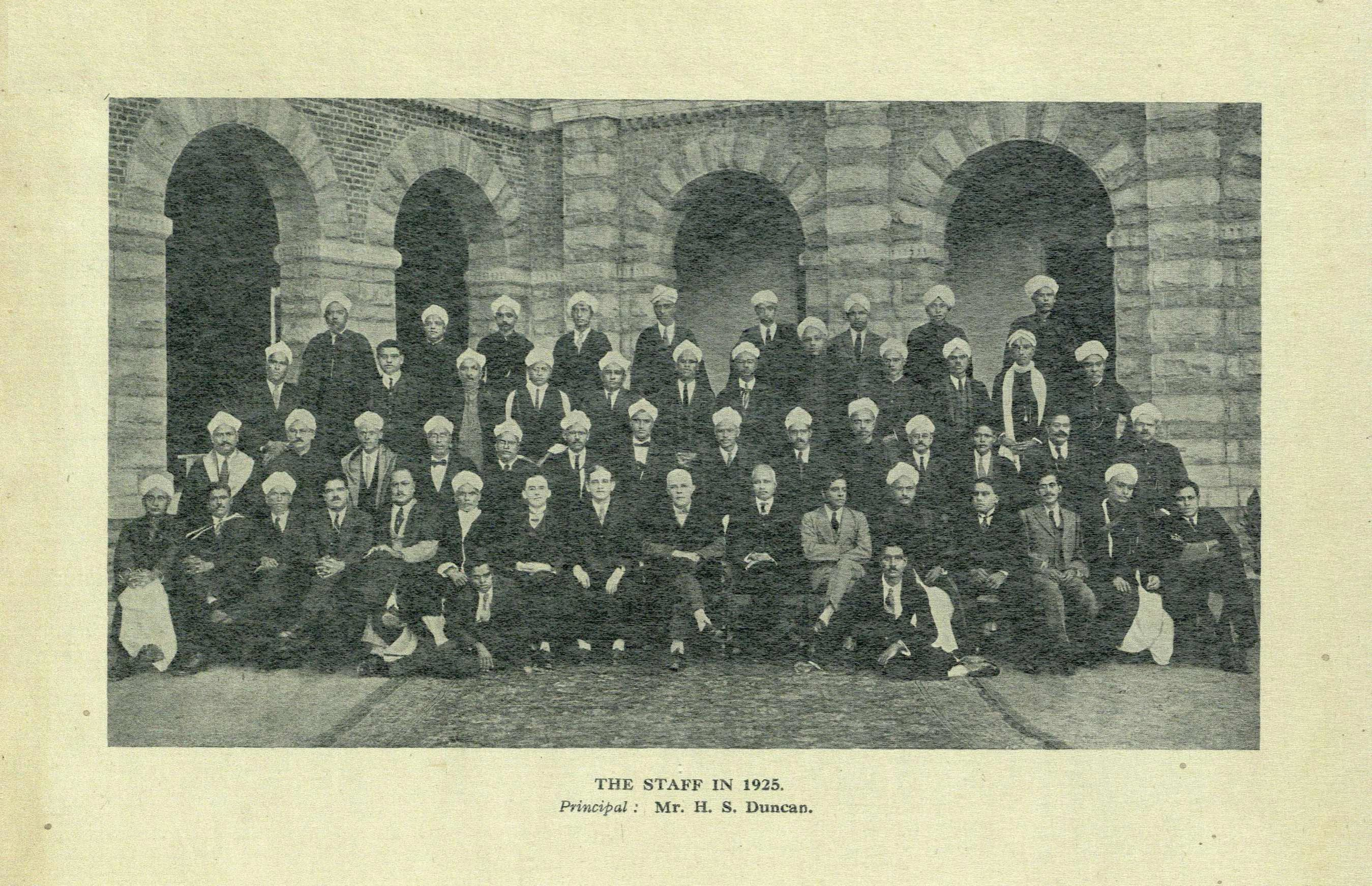
- M.O.P. Iyengar in 1925, first row, third from left
- Born: 15 December 1886; Madras, British India (now Chennai, India)
- Died: 10 December 1963 (aged 76)
- Education: Presidency College, Chennai; Queen Mary College, London
- Known for: Pioneering algae research in India; Studies on Volvocales; First President of the Phycological Society of India
- Scientific career
- Fields: Phycology, Botany
- Workplaces: Presidency College, Chennai; Madras University
- Doctoral advisor: Felix Eugen Fritsch
- Author abbrev. (botany): Iyengar

Mandayam Osuri Parthasarathy Iyengar (15 December 1886 – 10 December 1963) was a prominent Indian botanist and phycologist who researched the structure, cytology, reproduction and taxonomy of algae. He is known as the "father of Indian phycology" or "father of algology in India". He was the first President of Phycological Society of India. He primarily studied the Volvocales. He was the brother of M. O. T. Iyengar.

== Biography ==
Iyengar was born in Madras where his father M.O. Alasingrachariar worked as an attorney. The wealthy family was known for achievements in many walks of lives. After studies at the Hindu High School, he went to Presidency College, obtaining a BA degree in 1906 and an MA in 1909. He then became a curator in the Government Museum at Madras and became a lecturer in the Teacher's College in 1911. He became a professor of botany in the Presidency College in 1920 and worked on algae aside from teaching. He worked in the UK in 1930 along with Professor F.E. Fritsch at the Queen Mary College from where he received a PhD.

Iyengar was an active sportsman and swimmer. He rescued two of his students from drowning in the Pamban in 1925. He was also a billiards champion in Madras. He died from cerebral thrombosis.

Several taxa have been named after him including Iyengaria (Punctariaceae), Iyengarina (Dematiaceae), Iyengariella (Stigonemataceae), and Parthasarathiella (Stigonemataceae).

== Selected research papers ==
- Iyengar, M. (1962). "Euglena studies from Madras". Archiv für Mikrobiologie. 42 (3): 322–332. doi:10.1007/BF00422049. S2CID 20631388.
- Iyengar, M. (1973). "Contributions to our knowledge of South Indian algae. V.". Proceedings of the Indian Academy of Sciences, Section B. 78 (6): 257–274. doi:10.1007/BF03045606. S2CID 198141357.
- Iyengar, M.; Ramanath, K. R. (1974). "Contributions to our knowledge of South Indian algae. VI. Sexual reproduction in Crucigenia lauterbornei Schmidle". Proceedings of the Indian Academy of Sciences, Section B. 79 (6): 227–229. doi:10.1007/BF03045453. S2CID 198139755.
- Iyengar, M. (1974). "Contributions to our knowledge of South Indian algae. VII". Proceedings of the Indian Academy of Sciences, Section B. 79 (6): 236–250. doi:10.1007/BF03045455. S2CID 198143324.
- Iyengar, M. (1975). "Contributions to our knowledge of South Indian algae. VIII". Proceedings of the Indian Academy of Sciences, Section B. 81 (1): 29–60. doi:10.1007/BF03050744. S2CID 198139654.
- Iyengar, M.; Desikachary, T. (1976). "Contributions to our knowledge of South Indian algae. IX". Proceedings of the Indian Academy of Sciences, Section B. 84 (5): 159–164. doi:10.1007/BF03045536. S2CID 130712627.
- Iyengar, M. (1957). "Developmental stages of filariae in mosquitoes". South Pacific Commission Technical Paper. 104.
