= George Stephen West =

English botanist

George Stephen West ARCS, FLS
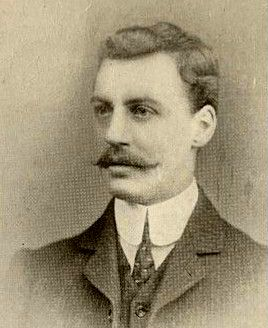
- George Stephen West, 1902
- Born: 20 April 1876; Bradford, England
- Died: 7 August 1919 (aged 43); Edgbaston, England
- Education: St John's College, Cambridge
- Known for: Specialist in algae and protistology
- Scientific career
- Fields: Botany
- Workplaces: Royal Agricultural College; University of Birmingham
- Notable students: Muriel Bristol
- Author abbrev. (botany): G.S.West

Signature
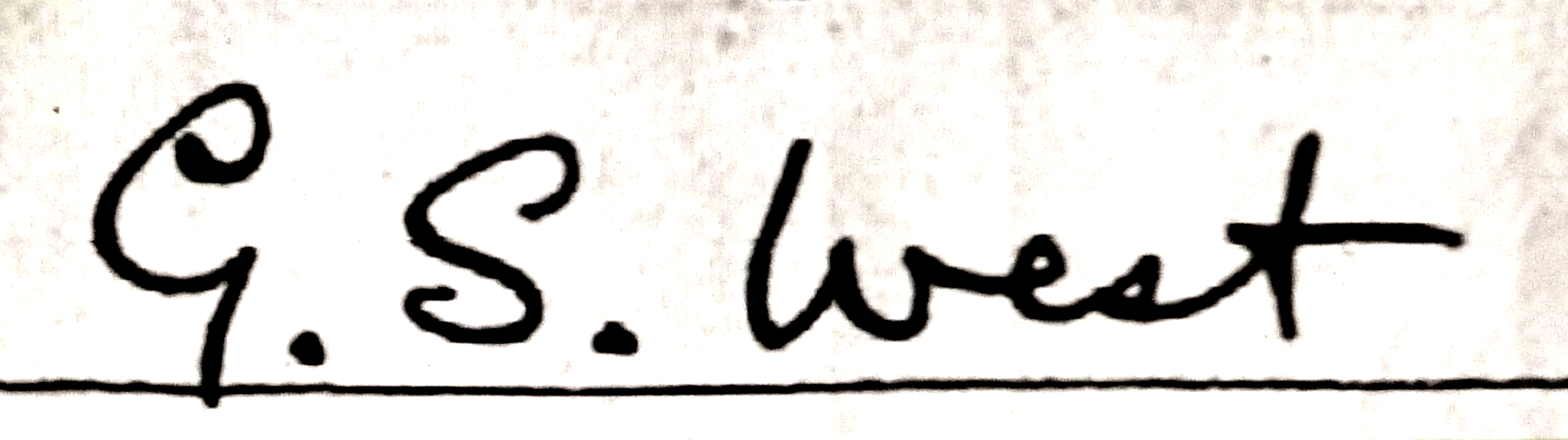

George Stephen West (20 April 1876 – 7 August 1919), ARCS, FLS, was a British botanist, a specialist in phycology and protistology, a botanical illustrator and a writer. With his father, botanist William West (West, 1848–1914), he collaborated on numerous scientific books. West's brother was the botanist William West Jr (W. West, 1875–1901), who assisted their father with fieldwork.

West was professor of natural history at the Royal Agricultural College at Cirencester, then was based for the rest of his life at the University of Birmingham, where he was elected Mason Professor of Botany, following the retirement of William Hillhouse. While there, he enlarged the botany department. One of his students was Muriel Bristol. He was a Fellow of the Linnean Society of London, and president of Birmingham Natural History and Philosophical Society.

West was married with two sons who were young children when he died at age 43 of double pneumonia. He left behind numerous scientific papers and other publications, of which his 1904 Treatise on the British Fresh-Water Algae and his 1916 Algae vol.i caught public attention, because they helped students to keep pace with contemporary new research, and its consequent fast-changing classification of species. When he died, he still had significant work planned.

== Background ==
George Stephen West's father was William West (1848–1914). He was born in Bradford on 20 April 1876; his elder brother was William West (1875–1901), and his sister was May West (b.c.1881).

West attended Bradford Technical College. He "began early to specialise in the Algae, especially the Desmids", then studied at the Royal College of Science, London, where he gained a 1st class degree in Natural Science Tripos in 1897 and 1898. He won the Forbes Medal and prize there in 1894. This was followed by St John's College, Cambridge, where he gained his Bachelor of Arts degree, and his Master of Arts on 10 March 1902. At Cambridge he was a scholar and Hutchinson Research Student, and was a demonstrator in biology there in 1899.

In 1906, West married Minnie Bullock Pratt (born Seedley 1881), and the couple had two sons: Ralph W.H. West (born Birmingham 1911) and Denison H. West (born Birmingham 1914). (Note: Marriages Sep 1906 West George Stephen and Pratt, Minnie Bullock, Kingston 2a 927. Births Jun 1911 West Ralph W. H. King's N. 6c 412. Births Sep 1914 West Denison H. Pratt Kings N. 6d 150. Births Mar 1881 Pratt Minnie Bullock Salford 8d 44) They lived at 13 Pekenham Road, Edgbaston, Birmingham. His pastimes were gardening and golf. When West's father died intestate on 15 May 1914, he inherited £2,065 7s 8d (equivalent to £206,042 in 2025).

On 7 August 1915, West suffered "a severe bout of influenza", from which he "never quite recovered". The "indifferent health" that followed his illness weakened him before his early death at Edgbaston in 1919 from double pneumonia. He left £499 6s 3d (equivalent to £22,290 in 2025) to his family. All his drawings of algae were left to the British Museum, and his specimens and library were bequeathed to the University of Birmingham. The Journal of Botany, British and Foreign commented: "The loss of his kindly encouragement and help to the eager band which he had gathered round him leaves a gap which will be difficult to fill".

== Career ==
=== Royal Agricultural College ===
West took a lecturing post at the Royal Agricultural College at Cirencester where he was professor of natural history from 1899 to 1906,

=== University of Birmingham ===
From 1906 until the end of his life, West was based at the University of Birmingham, where he gained his Doctorate of Science in 1908, and lectured in botany from 1906 to 1909. In 1909 at Birmingham he became professor, and then in 1916 he was appointed to the Mason Professorship of Botany, a position previously held by William Hillhouse. He was also a special lecturer in algology.

While at Birmingham, West "enlarged and improved the department, especially the herbarium". "West was an excellent teacher and lecturer, much liked by his pupils, and extremely successful in training them in the habit of scientific research". Two of his postgraduate students were Nellie Carter-Montford and Muriel Bristol.

=== Collaboration with William West ===
For some years, West collaborated on publications with his father William West, who shared his expertise on freshwater algae. Between 1893 and 1914 they co-authored numerous publications on freshwater algae".

=== Contributions elsewhere ===
West became a Fellow of the Linnean Society of London in 1901. In 1904 at the British Association meeting at Cambridge, he read a paper to the botany department. In 1913 West was president of Birmingham Natural History and Philosophical Society; as president he hosted an exhibition at Queen's College, Birmingham. The exhibition included "a series of stone algae and marine algae".

== Publications ==
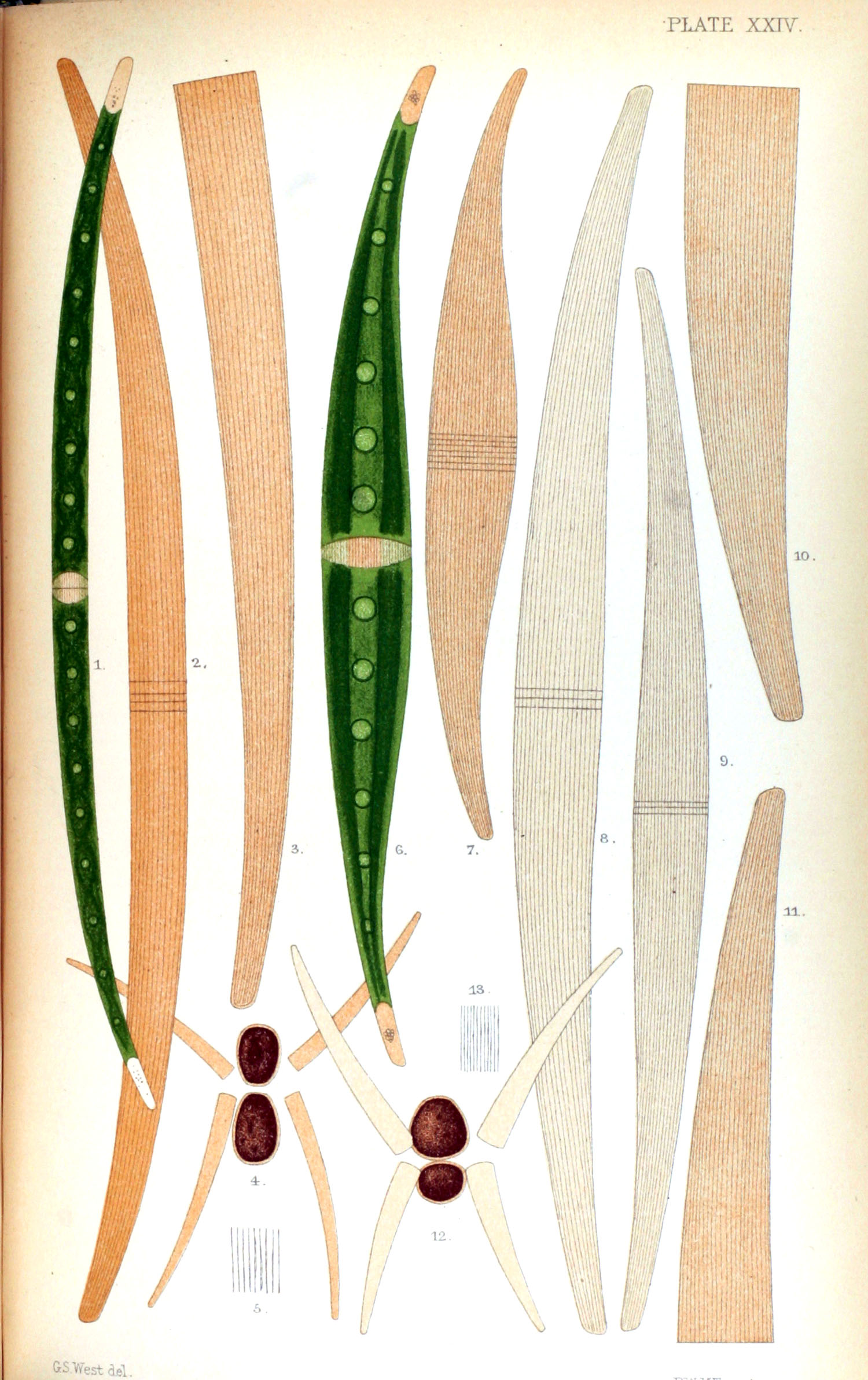
Illustration by G.S. West, from Monograph of the British Desmidiaceae (1904)

Note: The following is a selection of West's publications. He left some unfinished works when he died: Algal Flora of the Midlands, and British Freshwater Algae (excluding Diatoms and Desinids). He also contributed papers to various journals.

=== Notes and papers ===
- West, George Stephen (1895–1900). "Anatomical and Historical Characters of Poisonous Snakes (various papers)". Various Journals..
- West, George Stephen (1899). "Various systematic and oecological papers on Algae". Various Journals..
- West, George Stephen (1899). "Algo-flora from Cambridgeshire". Journal of Botany..
- West, George Stephen (1911–1915). "Algological notes XIV-XVII". Journal of Botany (53): 73–84..

=== Books ===
- West, George Stephen (1901–1904). Freshwater Rhizopods and Heliozoa..
- West, George Stephen (1904). A Treatise on the British Fresh-Water Algae. Cambridge University Press.
- West, William; West, George Stephen; Carter, N. (1904–1911). A Monograph of the British Desmidiaceae, vols 1–4..
- West, William; West, George Stephen (1904–1911). Treatise on British Freshwater Algae..
- West, George Stephen (1916). The Myxophyceae, Peridinieae, Bacillarieae and Chlorophyceae. Cambridge Botanical Handbooks. Also listed as: West, George Stephen (1916). Seward, A.C.; Tansley, A.G. (eds.). Algae vol.i, in Cambridge Botanical Manuals. Cambridge, England: Cambridge University Press.

=== Reviews ===
- The Sheffield Daily Telegraph reported: "Part 25 of the Transactions of the Yorkshire Naturalists' Union has just been issued ... It contains the third instalment of the list of the known freshwater algae of the county, compiled by Messrs W. West and G.S. West. The fame of these two gentlemen as botanists needs no advertisement from us" (1901).
- Regarding Algae, vol.i (1916), The Scotsman said: "The present work is the first of a series ... that promise to put the student of botany under a debt to the publishers and to the editors of the series. This volume is to be followed by others on lichens, fungi and gnetales. Professor West's work is a biological account of all the algae included in the myxophyceae, peridinieae, bacillarieae and chlorophyceae, both freshwater and marine. It is the first of the two volumes which, when completed, will replace the author's Treatise on British Fresh-Water Algae which, twelve years old, has fallen out of date, and is [as of 1916] no longer in circulation. Professor West has in contemplation a further work which will be a complete systematic account of all the fresh water algae (excepting desmids and diatoms) known to occur in the British islands. It is impossible to do more here than acknowledge the scope and success of his labours in the way of classifying and recording the great advances in knowledge made in this subject of recent years by the author himself and other workers, and the admirable manner in which the matter is arranged to facilitate the work of the student" (1916). [West died before he could complete all of the series].
- The Birmingham Daily Post shed some light on the context of one publication: "[Algae vol.i] is gratifying proof that enterprise in the publication of technical works helpful to students of science has not been discouraged by the war. Botany covers so wide a field, and is developing so rapidly in its various branches through modern research that it is becoming well-nigh impossible for the student to keep pace with the progress of discovery. Text books in the course of a few years become obsolete, the student is brought suddenly face to face with new classifications and nomenclature which he is totally unable to understand, and it is only with the aid of handbooks written by specialists on different groups that he is able to make himself familiar with the results of recent researches into the morphology and natural history of various branches of the natural kingdom. It is to meet this want that the present series is designed ... These volumes could not possibly have been entrusted to better hands [than those of G.S. West]. Like his father (W. West), Professor West has devoted many years of his life to investigating the algae, and his knowledge of the green algae, to which the first volume is very largely devoted, is unrivalled. The author's Treatise on Fresh-Water Algae, published twelve years ago, still remains the standard British work on the subject, and it is in order to bring it up to date in relation to modern research, of which Professor West has himself undertaken the lion's share, that the first two volumes of the new series of handbooks have been written. [West had re-classified the algae, and differentiations had been noted. Colouration of water, pigmentation of algae and the combination of light and chromatic changes were described in the book. The distinction between animal and plant were discussed, along with ideas about the evolution from flagellates to vegetables]. The book contains 271 illustrations, of which the great bulk have been drawn by the author". [The book sold for 25 shillings (equivalent to £94.01 in 2025)]. (1916).
- The Journal of Botany, British and Foreign said: "West was the leading expert of this country on freshwater algae: he could recognise at sight almost every British Desmid. His four beautifully illustrated volumes on British Desmidiaceae in the Ray Society's publications are well known; it [was] hoped to publish a fifth volume based on his notes. The investigations of father and son in the Desmids of the whole world made it clear that that group is peculiarly fitted to throw light on the problems of plant distribution and the evolution of species, owing to the fact that they can seldom survive desiccation even for a few hours" (1919).
- Regarding West's projected work, Algal Flora of the Midlands, the Journal of Botany said: "It is scarcely possible to imagine, apart from calcareous districts, a more unpromising area in this country for algae than that around Birmingham, yet West and his zealous helpers showed that even this could yield riches, including such a rarity as a new Roya in conjugation, probably the first that has ever been found in Britain in that condition. He proved again that, when a competent botanist settles down in a new locality, it begins at once to yield a previously unsuspected wealth of material" (1919).
- After West died, the Yorkshire Post and Leeds Intelligencer commented: "As far as biological studies can be said to be patriotic territorially, the study of the algae may be regarded as pre-eminently Yorkshire Natural History. Yorkshire naturalists are proud of the work accomplished in the study of the algae of nearly the whole world by the late William West of Bradford and his two clever sons, both of whom died prematurely. A work on the British Algae was nearly completed by the late Professor G.S. West when his recent death occurred. Unfortunately there are few serious writers in the country to continue the study" (1920).
- The Scotsman remembered West: "... the late Professor G.S. West's Treatise on the British Freshwater Algae, a scientific work on these plants that, since its first appearance in 1904, has played a leading part in instructing and stimulating the widespread research into the biology of the algae and related organisms which has been so fruitful of results during the past quarter of a century ..." (1927). [In 1927, Professor Felix Eugen Fritsch published a new, updated edition of the work].
