= Limacology =

Study of slugs

Limacology, from Ancient Greek λεῖμαξ (leîmax), meaning "slug", and λόγος (lógos), meaning "study", is the branch of zoology which deals with slugs, i.e. shell-less gastropod mollusks. A person that studies limacology is referred to as a limacologist.

However, slugs are an extremely polyphyletic group, thus "limacology" is not a taxonomically accurate term, and it is now rarely used. Limacology is a branch of malacology. Early interest in slugs can be traced back to the 19th century

== Limacologists ==
- William Denison Roebuck

== See also ==
- Mollusks
- Gastropods
