= Phycological Society of India =

The Phycological Society of India was founded and registered as Society on 1962. Prof. M. O. P. Iyengar was the first President of the society. Prof. Vidyavati, former Vice-Chancellor, Kakatiya University, Telangana, India is the President now.

The Phycological Society of India promotes interest and studies in various branches of phycology.

== Publications ==
The Society also publishes a half yearly research journal called Phykos and the first volume was published in April 1962.
