= Fritschiella aquatilis =

Scientific classification
- Clade: Viridiplantae
- Division: Chlorophyta
- Class: Chlorophyceae
- Order: Chaetophorales
- Family: Fritschiellaceae
- Genus: Fritschiella
- Species: F. aquatilis

Binomial name
- Fritschiella aquatilis H.Su, J.Feng, J.Lv, Q.Liu, F.Nan & S.Xie

Species of lichen

Fritschiella aquatilis is a species of freshwater green alga in the family Chaetophoraceae. It features a unique globular, hairy morphology. It was discovered in the city of Taiyuan, Shanxi province, China, and can be found in freshwater aquariums with ornamental fish. The species exhibits some differences from the closely related Fritschiella tuberosa, which is primarily found in soil environments. Molecular phylogenetic data has supported the classification of F. aquatilis as a new species within the genus Fritschiella.

== Taxonomy ==
Fritschiella aquatilis was scientifically described as a new species in 2019 by a group of Chinese scientists. The species epithet, aquatilis, refers to its freshwater habitat. The type specimen was collected in Taiyuan City, Shanxi Province, China, in a freshwater aquarium containing ornamental fish. The holotype is deposited at Shanxi University under the voucher number SXUHB-170501.

=== Phylogeny ===
Molecular phylogenetic analysis using 28S rDNA, 18S rDNA, and rbcL gene sequences has indicated that F. aquatilis is a distinct species in the genus Fritschiella. The analysis also revealed a close relationship between F. aquatilis and F. tuberosa, but with significant genetic differences between the two species. The occurrence of compensatory base changes (CBCs) and hemi-CBCs in the ITS2 secondary structure further supports the classification of F. aquatilis as a new species.

== Description ==
The thallus (body) of F. aquatilis is green and globular, ranging from 0.1–2 cm in diameter. It comprises numerous small, uniseriate (i.e., lined up in a single row) filamentous branches that radiate outwards. The cells of the thallus are cylindrical, filled with banded chloroplasts, and measure 4–10 μm in width and 15–30 μm in height. A unique characteristic of this species is the presence of numerous obvious pyrenoids within the cells.

Fritschiella aquatilis shares some similarities with its close relative, F. tuberosa, such as its filamentous and heterotrichous structure (i.e., having a thallus that is partly prostrate and partly upright) but it exhibits distinct features that differentiate it as a new species within the genus Fritschiella.

== Habitat and distribution ==
Fritschiella aquatilis is exclusively found in Taiyuan City, Shanxi Province, China. It grows in small freshwater aquariums alongside Chlorella species and ornamental fish. The thallus of F. aquatilis either sinks to the bottom of the tank or floats on the water surface, where it can receive direct sunlight.

The discovery of F. aquatilis, an aquatic species within the genus Fritschiella, signifies a transition from terrestrial to aquatic habitats and broadens the known range of environments that Fritschiella species can inhabit.
