= Vidyavati =

Female botanist from India

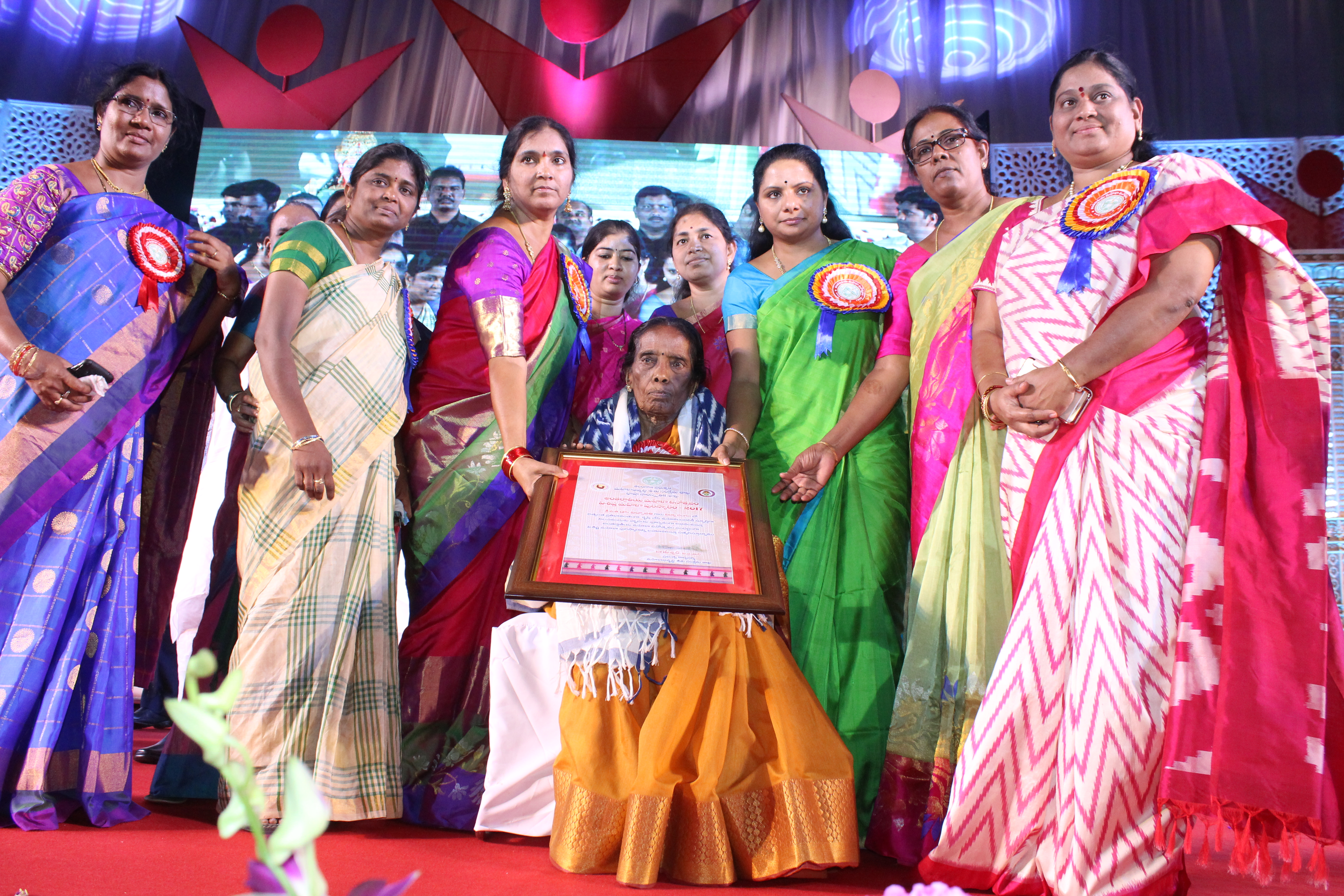
- Vidyavati (center) receiving Eminent Women award from Telangana Government
- Born: 15 September 1939 (age 87)
- Title: Vice-Chancellor (retired)
- Board member of: Phycological Society of India, President; Seaweed Research and Utilization; National Assessment and Accreditation Council; Sarojini Naidu Centre for Women Studies; Journal of Aquatic Ecosystem Health
- Awards: Best Women Scientist (2000); Gold Medal by Plant Science Association (2007); Lifetime Achievement Award in Chennai (2007); International Women’s Day recognition (2017)

Academic background
- Thesis: Experimental and Cytological Studies on Certain Desmids (1967)
- Doctoral advisor: Profs. Jafar Nizam and M.R. Saxena

Academic work
- Discipline: Botany
- Sub-discipline: Hydrobiology, phycology, cytology and ultrastructure ecology
- Institutions: Kakatiya University

Vidyavati (born 15 September 1939) is a former Vice-Chancellor, Kakatiya University, Warangal, Telangana, India. She is President of Phycological Society of India and was honored by Telangana State Government as Eminent Women on 8 March 2017, on the occasion of "International Women's Day" celebrations.

== Career ==
- In 1968, she was appointed permanent lecturer and posted at P.G. Centre of Osmania University at Warangal, which later on, in the year 1974, become Kakatiya University.
- She assumed charge as Vice-Chancellor of the University on 6 May 1998 for a period of three years.

== Research ==
She was a Commonwealth Academic Staff Fellow at Royal Holloway, Belford College and University College London, where she received three months of training in biological material processing for electron microscopy with Prof. John D. Dodge. She did post-doctoral research with Dr. J. Sulek at the Tribune Institute of Microbiology, Czechoslovakia. She also visited various institutions in Oxford, Cambridge, France, Czechoslovakia, Bratislava and Toronto. As Professor of Botany, she attended the British Library meeting in Liverpool, United Kingdom, in 1980 under a Commonwealth Academic Staff Fellowship at the age of 81.

She visited Czechoslovakia from 1984-85 under the Indo-Czech Cultural Exchange Programme. In August 1998, she visited Canada to attend the Association of Commonwealth Universities' General Conference of Executive Heads. She presented a paper titled "University Leadership and Management of Change" at the Suwon Campus of Kyung Hee University in 1999. In her 36 years of work, she has contributed over 350 papers to national and international journals, guided 25 Ph.D.s and two M. Phils. and published ten books.

== Offices held ==
- President, Phycological Society of India.
- Associate Editor of Seaweed Research and Utilization, an international Journal.
- Chairperson, National Assessment and Accreditation Council, Bangalore.
- National Advisory Committee, Sarojini Naidu Centre for Women Studies, Hyderabad.
- Associate editor, Journal of Aquatic Ecosystem Health, USA.
- Appointed as member of search Committee to suggest a panel of names for appointment to the post of Vice-Chancellor, Dr. YSR Horticultural University, West Godavari District by Government of Andhra Pradesh.

== Awards and honours ==
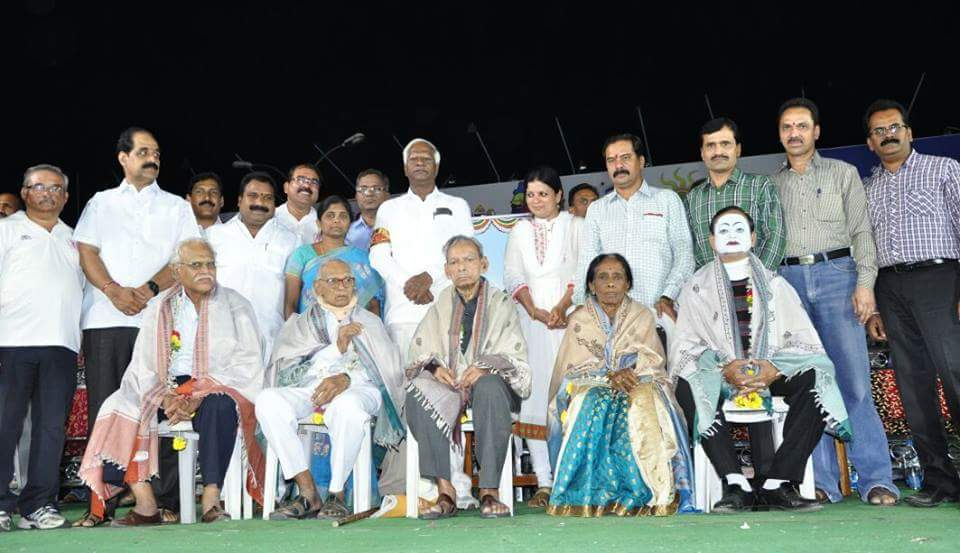
Vidyavati felicitated on Telangana formation Day

She was honoured with Best Women Scientist award in 2000 at Indian Institute of Chemical Technology, Hyderabad, Telangana and was awarded Gold Medal by Plant Science Association, Uttar Pradesh and felicitated in a "National Seminar on Current Trends in Biotechnology," organized by the Department of Biotechnology, Lal Bahadur College, Warangal on 30 November and 1 December 2007. She was also Guest of honour in various National and International Seminars.

In 2007, she was given Lifetime Achievement Award in Chennai. In 2015, the district administration of Warangal and Kadiyam Srihari felicitated her on the occasion of Telangana Formation Day celebrations. She was patron for National Conference on Biodiversity, Biology and Biotechnology of Algae (NCBBBA-2017), 9 - 10, January, 2017 Organized by Centre for Advanced Studies in Botany University of Madras, Guindy Campus, Chennai, Tamil Nadu, India.

The Government of Telangana through K. Kavitha, Member of Parliament, Nizamabad and Padma Devender Reddy, First Deputy Speaker in Telangana Legislative Assembly felicitated her reward on occasion of International Women’s Day on 8 March 2017.

== See also ==
List of people with surname Goud
