= Felix Eugen Fritsch =

British marine biologist

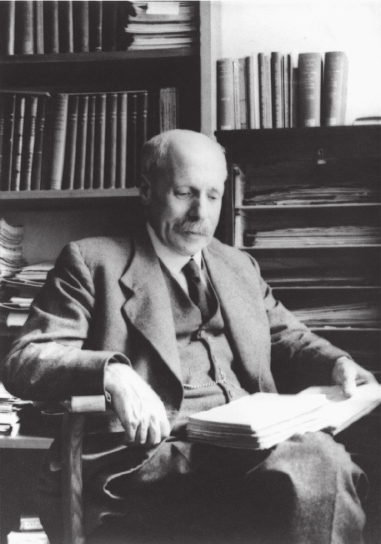

Felix Eugen Fritsch FRS (26 April 1879 – 2 May 1954) was a British biologist.

Fritssch was born in Hampstead in London in 1879 where his father owned and operated a school.

Fritsch started his career at the Ludwig-Maximilians-Universität München before moving to research at University College London and also the Royal Botanic Gardens at Kew. He was Professor and Head of the Botanical Department, Queen Mary College (formerly East London College), University of London, from 1911 to 1948. He was elected a Fellow of the Royal Society in May 1932 and won their Darwin Medal in 1950. He served as president of the Linnean Society from 1949 to 1952 and was awarded the society's Linnean Medal in 1954.

He is best known internationally for his comprehensive two-volume The Structure and Reproduction of the Algae; However his co-authored 1927 revised edition of G.S. West's A Treatise of the British Freshwater Algae of 1904 was also important. He had a great influence through his own research and also his encouragement to students. As an aid to his own studies on algal taxonomy and morphology, Fritsch brought together published illustrations under the names of the species. After his death this was continued by Dr J.W.G. Lund at the Freshwater Biological Association and became The Fritsch Collection of Illustrations of Freshwater Algae.

He was honoured in 1932, when botanist Mandeyam Osuri Parthasarathy Iyengar published Fritschiella, which is a genus of green algae in the family Fritschiellaceae and named after Felix Eugen Fritsch.

== See also ==
- History of Phycology
