= William Denison Roebuck =

British malacologist

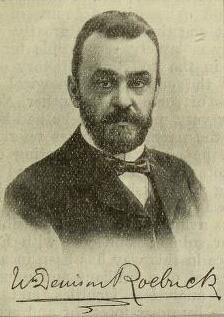
Photographic portrait (before 1914)

William Denison Roebuck, FLS (5 January 1851 – 15 February 1919) was an English Naturalist, collector and writer, specialising in Malacology, Conchology and Limacology. He was one of the founding members and secretary of the Yorkshire Union of Naturalists, and the editor of its journal The Naturalist.

== Early life ==
William Denison Roebuck was born in Leeds on 5 January 1851, and resided there until seventeen years of age, when his parents removed their summer residence to Pannal, a village near Harrogate, and during his summer residences there in 1868 and succeeding years, he commenced the active collection, study and registry of the Butterflies and other insects met with, encouraged by the possession and perusal of Coleman's British Butterflies. His observations upon the Bees and allied groups made at this period were placed on record in the Victoria County Histories.

== Career ==
=== Entomology ===
Although not professing to be an Entomologist, Roebuck was always interested in that science, and was rarely absent from a meeting of the Entomological Section of the Yorkshire Naturalists’ Union. In his earlier days he had done excellent work in the science, including a paper entitled 'Locusts in Yorkshire', which appeared in The Naturalist in 1877. The title does not indicate the scope of that paper, which was in reality a history of all the known locust flights throughout Britain from the years 1842 to 1876, and was at the time of his death the most comprehensive and exhaustive account of that subject. Then at one time he was greatly interested in Hymenoptera, and was largely responsible for the list of that group of insects in the Victoria History of Yorkshire, as he was also for the entire Entomological chapters in the Victoria Histories of some of the other Northern Counties of England. For very many years he had kept records, with references, of all the papers and notes referring to all orders of insects (when he could do so, cutting out and keeping the papers or notes themselves) published in the various journals, referring to Yorkshire and other North of England Counties, and so was in possession of a vast store of information which was always available to any responsible author writing on any particular subject connected with Entomology. His help to the science in this way was considerable.

He was positively associated with the Yorkshire Naturalists' Union, The Conchological Society, the Leeds Naturalists' Field Club, the Leeds Conchological Club, the Leeds Philatelic Society, and other groups.

=== Learned societies ===
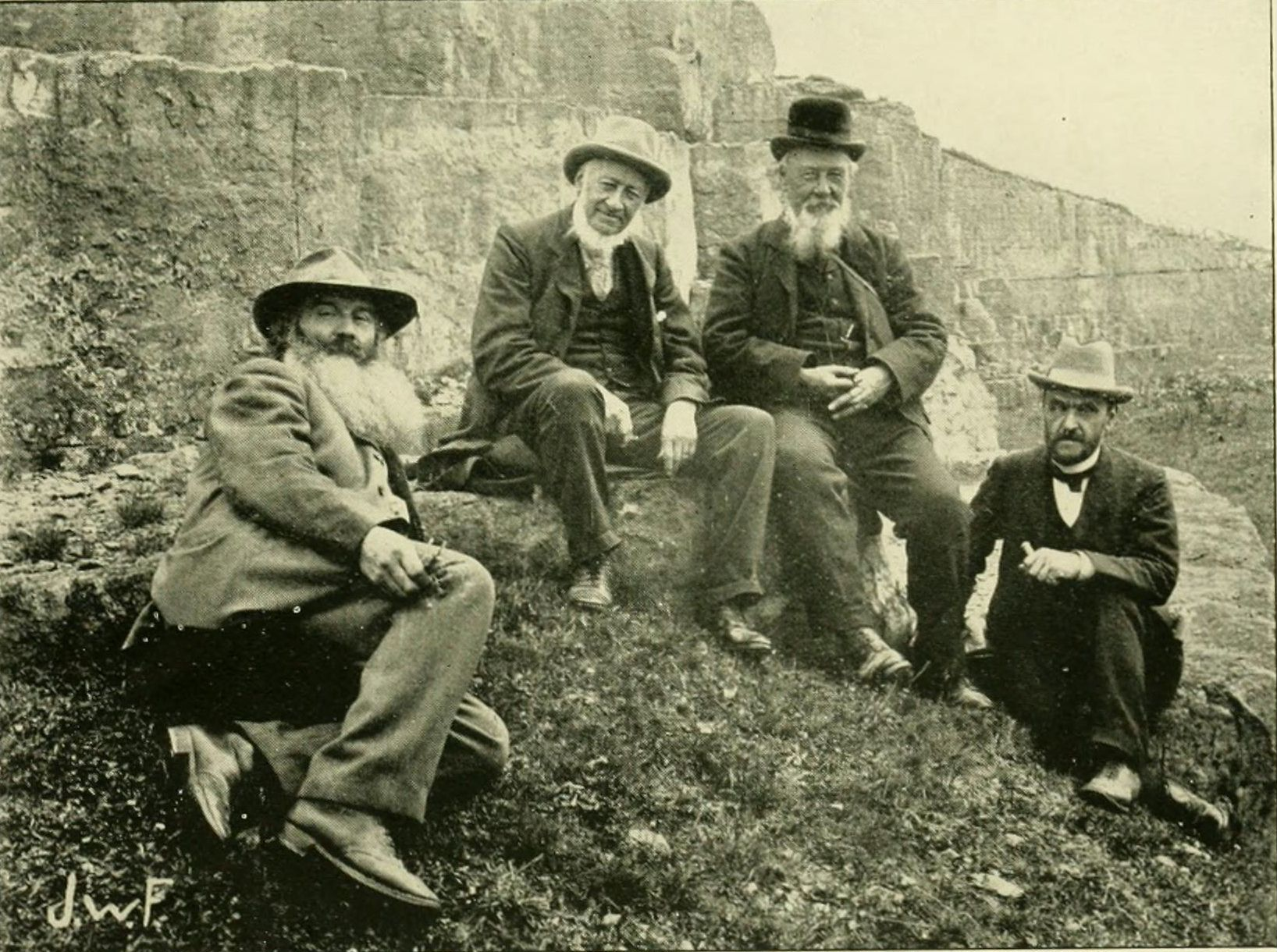
Four fellows of the Linnean Society: John Farrah, Dr R. Braithwaite, M.B. Slater, W. Denison Roebuck (1903)

The Yorkshire Naturalists' Union, of which he was the inspirer and organizer, had ever a chief place in his affections and interest, for he it was who conceived the idea of its formation by the enlargement of the sphere of activity and usefulness of the West Riding Consolidated Naturalists' Society, an Association of the Natural History Societies of South-west Yorkshire, of which Roebuck was appointed joint secretary with J. M. Barber, of Heckmondwike, in 1876.

In the following year with the enthusiastic co-operation of G. T. Porritt, C. P. Hobkirk and other leading Yorkshire Scientists, the Yorkshire Naturalists' Union was established as a means of a more efficient unification of Yorkshire scientific effort, while the subsequent adoption of Roebuck's suggestion to institute working sections for each branch of Natural History was remarkably successful and tended more fully to ensure a closer fellowship and a more general spirit of co-operation among the numerous Yorkshire Societies.

This Union, constituted by the federation of upwards of forty local Natural History Societies, comprising some thousands of members, was then an organization second only in influence and membership to the British Association. A long list of distinguished scientists held the post of President, among them being Roebuck, who held the position in 1903, and as the topic for his Valedictory Address, placed on record a full and authoritative history of the Union and The Naturalist from their inception.

He it was who conceived and constituted the 'Fungus Forays' which were such a great success, as to eventually become one of the leading features of the Union's work. The first foray was held in 1881 at Studley and Harrogate, and followed by the second in 1888, and were so thoroughly appreciated by those concerned, that the meetings were arranged as Annual events, and the results obtained culminated by the publication, in the Transactions of the Union, of The Fungus Flora of Yorkshire, by the joint labours of George Massee and Charles Crossland.

Roebuck was the Honorary Secretary and one of the impelling spirits of the activities of the Union for nearly thirty years, and in addition to this onerous post was Editor of the Scientific Transactions, an important series of publications which included many works of high scientific merit. From 1884 to 1902 he was sole Editor of The Naturalist with the exception of comparatively short periods in which he had the collaboration of W. Eagle Clarke and E. R. Waite. In addition to all these duties he personally made all the arrangements for the numerous excursions and meetings held during each year for business purposes or for the investigation of the fauna and flora of the county.

Besides these calls upon his time and energy he in 1881, in association with Dr. Clarke, prepared and published the important and standard work The Vertebrate Fauna of Yorkshire which the bibliographic and scientific knowledge they possessed, enabled them to issue with remarkable completeness. In addition he gave priceless and unstinted help to friends and correspondents upon very diverse subjects, either the results of his own personal experience or culled from the enormous mass of classified records which he had accumulated by years of industry and research.

This valuable assistance has been acknowledged by G. T. Porritt in his Manual A list of Yorkshire Lepidoptera; by T. H. Nelson in his Birds of Yorkshire, by J. W. Taylor in his Monograph of British Land and Fresh-water Mollusca, and others.

The formation of the Lincolnshire Naturalists' Union was entirely due to the suggestion of Roebuck, who always maintained a lively interest in its welfare and progress and frequently attended its meetings. With the co-operation of Rev. E. A. Woodruffe-Peacock, J. F. Musham, H. Wallis Kew and other Lincolnshire Naturalists he thoroughly and systematically investigated its Molluscan fauna, of which he has already published a preliminary list and accumulated the material for a more complete account.

With J. F. Musham, he was alternately President and Secretary of the Conchological Section and always kept the Conchological records of the Society.

The Union fittingly signalised their appreciation of the value of his services by selecting him as the President for 1909–10, and an account of his life and work by Rev. E. A. Woodruffe-Peacock, with portrait, was published in the Transactions of the Union for the year 1915.

Roebuck was also one of the founders of the Leeds Field Naturalists' Club, in 1870, and was, to the last, one of the most valued and influential of its members, while the numerous quarto volumes of written and classified records of all forms of life, by his hands, in possession of the Society, represent his zeal and industry in the cause of the Society and the progress of science, and have proved of immense utility to various authors who availed themselves of the stores of knowledge they contain.

He several times filled the office of President, his enthusiasm and personal magnetism attracting good assemblages of members to the meetings, and his terms of office were always periods of prosperity and progress.

As Secretary in 1871 he worked to further the interests of the Society. It became a successful provincial Society and has turned out an unusually large proportion of skilled zoological investigators.

=== Malacology ===
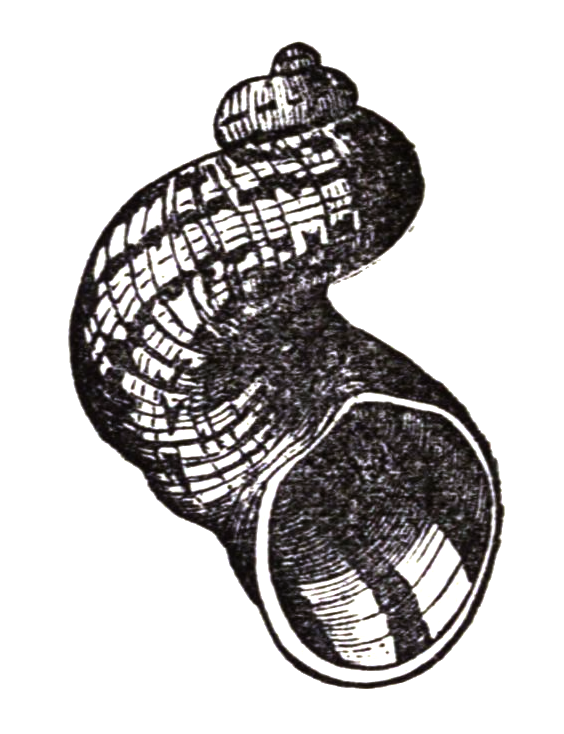
Scalarid form of Helix aspersa (1892)

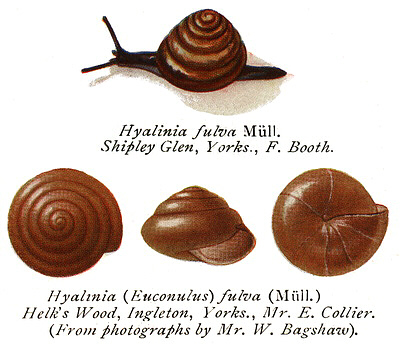
Euconulus fulvus (1894)

As a Malacologist, Roebuck was one of the four original founders of The Conchological Society of Great Britain and Ireland, an organization which went on to have a numerous and influential membership not merely in the United Kingdom, but in all parts of the Western world.

He acted for many years as Honorary Secretary, and much of the Society's success may be traced to the foresight and genius he displayed in the preparation of the rules governing its activities. As President he was a very popular officer, and an unusually large influx of new members took place during his period of office, a striking testimony to his reputation and influence in the scientific world, which was further emphasised by his unanimous selection as one of the ten Honorary Members of the Society.

=== Limacology ===
Roebuck's became the pioneer and populariser of the modern study of the terrestrial slugs, a group which prior to his adoption of slugs as a field of study, was a neglected and despised set of animals. Because of him in the course of a few years, six new species of slugs were discovered or differentiated from previously known species with which they had hitherto been confused, and thus raised the number of British species from twelve to eighteen.Because of his actions he became pre-eminent amongst British Limacologists and the universally acknowledged authority on the morphology of the British species of Limacidcae and Arionidae, with whose aspect he was most profoundly conversant.

The conspicuous Urocyclus roebucki is named in honor of Roebuck for his pioneering contributions.

Roebuck was Elected Honorary Life President of the Leeds Conchological Club in honor of his esteemed services to science and the club.

As a further representative example of his interest and activity in the cause of science, during his long and useful life, may be reckoned the great and valued help and guidance he rendered in the formation of The Craven Naturalists' and Scientific Association thirty-two years before his death, contributing afterwards in many ways to its welfare and progress. The Association gratefully remembered and appreciated his many and willing services in its cause on the occasion of his death in 1919.

=== Philately ===
One of the chief interests of his later years was Philately, for the promotion of the study of which subject he in 1890, in conjunction with his friend, T. K. Skipwith, founded the Leeds Philatelic Society, which with the exception of the Royal Philatelic Society of London is the oldest in the United Kingdom. Of this organisation he was the Secretary at the time of his death and had previously filled the office of President.

His energies in this study, were for many years past, especially devoted to the collection of British issues, and in this branch his collection was so large and valuable, that on the visit of George V to Leeds in September 1915, a special audience was arranged to enable him to show to the King the issues of especial interest or rarity contained in the collection.

This rich and valuable collection, which illustrated the history and uses of stamps generally, was presented by Roebuck in 1913 to the University of Leeds, where it forms one of their choice treasures.

=== Appraisal ===
Roebuck's great attainments and the important influence he exercised in the promotion of science and scientific methods were gracefully and fittingly acknowledged in July 1915, when the University of Leeds publicly conferred upon him the honorary degree of Master of Science. On that occasion Professor Garstang, in citing the grounds for the distinction bestowed, acclaimed him as 'the pioneer and organizer of the systematic survey of the natural history of the county, the man of method, insisting upon the guarantees of accuracy and completeness, the keeper of our records, a student of many sided interests, and of indefatigable perseverance.'

He was indeed not only the inspirer of energy and persistence, his was also the guiding hand which led the real workers into habits of systematic investigation and publication; he inculcated the combination of broad views in general, with rigid and detailed registration of the material results. The importance of accurate and full data, the study of variation and the proportionately greater value of the common or dominant species in studying Geographical Distribution was consistently urged upon every suitable occasion.

For a great number of years he diligently examined many parts of the British Isles, but he was especially attached to the investigation of the fauna of Yorkshire and Lincolnshire, with which counties from years of travel he was thoroughly familiar.

During 1904-1906 he travelled extensively abroad visiting Australia, New Zealand, India, South Africa, and Egypt, and made many interesting additions to scientific knowledge of the diffusion and dominance of the European species of mollusks and other organisms which had been designedly or unwittingly introduced by man to those countries.

His zealous and whole-hearted pursuit of Natural History was stimulating and infectious, and gathered around him sympathetic supporters and coadjutors in the work he was engaged upon, and gave a decided impetus to scientific pursuits in Yorkshire and beyond, but the immensity and variety of his services to science, are as yet only inadequately understood or utilised, even by his most intimate and appreciative friends who knew and valued his untiring zeal and devotion to the advancement of knowledge and his many personal sacrifices in its cause.

== Death ==
Roebuck died on 15 February 1919, in the sixty-ninth year of his age. His death was the result of a sudden paralytic seizure on the evening of 19 January, when apparently in the full enjoyment of health and strength; he was gradually recovering from this attack when he had a second seizure from the effects of which he gradually succumbed.

=== Funeral ===
The remains were cremated on 17 February at Lawnswood Cemetery, Leeds, the service being attended by a representative assembly of Scientists; the University of Leeds being represented by Professor E. O. Croft, MD; the Linnean Society of London by G. T. Porritt, FLS, and W. H. Burrell, FLS; the Yorkshire Naturalists' Union by Professor Garstang, D.Sc., Fowler Jones, Godfrey Bingley and others; the Leeds Corporation (Education Department) by Alderman W. H. Clarke; the Leeds Philosophical and Literary Society by H. Crowther, FRMS; the Leeds Naturalists' Field Club by J. A. Hargreaves, E. J. T. Ingle, C. A. Cheetham, J. Fry Pickard, C. Turner, B. Beevers and others; the Conchological Society of Great Britain and Ireland by J. Wilfrid Jackson, FGS., and J. W. Taylor, M.Sc.; the Leeds Conchological Club by F. Booth and Harrison Hutton; the Leeds Co-operative Field Club by S. Matthewman, and the Doncaster Scientific Society by Dr. H. H. Corbett. The Royal Philatelic Society of London was represented by Abraham Oxley; the Leeds Philatelic Society by T. K. Skipwith, W. K. Skipwith, J. H. Thackrah, Eugene Égly, F. J. Kidson and others, and the Yorkshire Numismatic Society by J. Digbv Firth, FLS.

== Publications ==
- Williams, J. W.; Taylor, J. W.; Roebuck, W. Denison (1892). Land and Fresh-water Shells: An Introduction to the Study of Conchology. With a Chapter on the Distribution of the British Land and Fresh-water Mollusca. 2nd ed. London: Swan Sonnenschein & Co.
- Taylor, John William (1894). Monograph of the Land & Freshwater Mollusca of the British Isles. By John W. Taylor … with the assistance of W. Denison Roebuck, F.L.S., the late Charles Ashford, and other well-known conchologists. Leeds: Taylor Brothers.

== Sources ==
- Ainsworth, Geoffrey C. (1996). Webster, John; Moore, David (eds.). Brief Biographies of British Mycologists. Stourbridge: British Mycological Society. pp. 30, 42, 143–144, 193.
- Bradford, Eveleigh (January 2019). "William Denison Roebuck, FLS (1851 – 1919) Naturalist, Collector, Writer". The Thoresby Society. The Leeds Library. Retrieved 26 May 2022.
- Taylor, John W. (1 April 1919). "In Memoriam: William Denison Roebuck". In Sheppard, Thos.; Woodhead, Thomas William (eds.). The Naturalist: A Monthly Journal of Natural History for the North of England. No. 744 (No. 518 of current series). London: A. Brown & Sons., Ltd. pp. 143–149.
