= Lists of fellows of the Royal Society by election year =

This is a list of fellows of the Royal Society by election year. The Royal Society was founded in 1660.

== 17th century ==
- Founders
- 1661
- 1662
- 1663
- 1664
- 1665
- 1666
- 1667
- 1668
- 1669
- 1670
- 1671
- 1672
- 1673
- 1674
- 1675
- 1676
- 1677
- 1678
- 1679
- 1680
- 1681
- 1682
- 1683
- 1684
- 1685
- 1686
- 1687
- 1688
- 1689
- 1690
- 1691
- 1692
- 1693
- 1694
- 1695
- 1696
- 1697
- 1698
- 1699
- 1700

== 18th century ==
- 1701
- 1702
- 1703
- 1704
- 1705
- 1706
- 1707
- 1708
- 1709
- 1710
- 1711
- 1712
- 1713
- 1714
- 1715
- 1716
- 1717
- 1718
- 1719
- 1720
- 1721
- 1722
- 1723
- 1724
- 1725
- 1726
- 1727
- 1728
- 1729
- 1730
- 1731
- 1732
- 1733
- 1734
- 1735
- 1736
- 1737
- 1738
- 1739
- 1740
- 1741
- 1742
- 1743
- 1744
- 1745
- 1746
- 1747
- 1748
- 1749
- 1750
- 1751
- 1752
- 1753
- 1754
- 1755
- 1756
- 1757
- 1758
- 1759
- 1760
- 1761
- 1762
- 1763
- 1764
- 1765
- 1766
- 1767
- 1768
- 1769
- 1770
- 1771
- 1772
- 1773
- 1774
- 1775
- 1776
- 1777
- 1778
- 1779
- 1780
- 1781
- 1782
- 1783
- 1784
- 1785
- 1786
- 1787
- 1788
- 1789
- 1790
- 1791
- 1792
- 1793
- 1794
- 1795
- 1796
- 1797
- 1798
- 1799
- 1800

== 19th century ==
- 1801
- 1802
- 1803
- 1804
- 1805
- 1806
- 1807
- 1808
- 1809
- 1810
- 1811
- 1812
- 1813
- 1814
- 1815
- 1816
- 1817
- 1818
- 1819
- 1820
- 1821
- 1822
- 1823
- 1824
- 1825
- 1826
- 1827
- 1828
- 1829
- 1830
- 1831
- 1832
- 1833
- 1834
- 1835
- 1836
- 1837
- 1838
- 1839
- 1840
- 1841
- 1842
- 1843
- 1844
- 1845
- 1846
- 1847
- 1848
- 1849
- 1850
- 1851
- 1852
- 1853
- 1854
- 1855
- 1856
- 1857
- 1858
- 1859
- 1860
- 1861
- 1862
- 1863
- 1864
- 1865
- 1866
- 1867
- 1868
- 1869
- 1870
- 1871
- 1872
- 1873
- 1874
- 1875
- 1876
- 1877
- 1878
- 1879
- 1880
- 1881
- 1882
- 1883
- 1884
- 1885
- 1886
- 1887
- 1888
- 1889
- 1890
- 1891
- 1892
- 1893
- 1894
- 1895
- 1896
- 1897
- 1898
- 1899
- 1900

== 20th century ==
- 1901
- 1902
- 1903
- 1904
- 1905
- 1906
- 1907
- 1908
- 1909
- 1910
- 1911
- 1912
- 1913
- 1914
- 1915
- 1916
- 1917
- 1918
- 1919
- 1920
- 1921
- 1922
- 1923
- 1924
- 1925
- 1926
- 1927
- 1928
- 1929
- 1930
- 1931
- 1932
- 1933
- 1934
- 1935
- 1936
- 1937
- 1938
- 1939
- 1940
- 1941
- 1942
- 1943
- 1944
- 1945
- 1946
- 1947
- 1948
- 1949
- 1950
- 1951
- 1952
- 1953
- 1954
- 1955
- 1956
- 1957
- 1958
- 1959
- 1960
- 1961
- 1962
- 1963
- 1964
- 1965
- 1966
- 1967
- 1968
- 1969
- 1970
- 1971
- 1972
- 1973
- 1974
- 1975
- 1976
- 1977
- 1978
- 1979
- 1980
- 1981
- 1982
- 1983
- 1984
- 1985
- 1986
- 1987
- 1988
- 1989
- 1990
- 1991
- 1992
- 1993
- 1994
- 1995
- 1996
- 1997
- 1998
- 1999
- 2000

== 21st century ==
- 2001
- 2002
- 2003
- 2004
- 2005
- 2006
- 2007
- 2008
- 2009
- 2010
- 2011
- 2012
- 2013
- 2014
- 2015
- 2016
- 2017
- 2018
- 2019
- 2020
- 2021
- 2022
- 2023
- 2024
