= Martin Dawson =

Martin Dawson may refer to:

- Martin D. Dawson, British professor of photonics
- Martin Henry Dawson, Canadian-born researcher in the field of infectious diseases
