= Brothers in Law =

Brothers in Law may refer to:

- Sibling-in-law, a person related to another by being the sibling of a spouse or the spouse of a sibling
- Brothers in Law (novel), a 1955 British novel
- Brothers in Law (film), a 1957 film adaptation
- Brothers in Law (TV series), a 1962 television series based on the novel
- Brothers in Law (Radio series) adapted from the TV series by Richard Waring
- The Brothers-in-Law, a Canadian musical group
- The Brother-in-Law, an 1817 play by Henry Card
- Russell and Callum
