= Paul Bates =

Paul Bates may refer to:

- Paul Bates (cricketer) (born 1974), former English cricketer
- Paul Bates (hydrologist), British professor at the University of Bristol
- Paul L. Bates (1908–1995), United States Army officer
