= List of fellows of the Royal Society elected in 2022 =

This article lists fellows of the Royal Society who were elected in 2022.

== Fellows ==
1. Fernando Alday
2. Simon Boulton
3. Graham Burton
4. Jason Chin
5. Roberto Cipolla
6. Martin Dawson
7. Douglas Easton
8. Robin Franklin
9. Pierre Friedlingstein
10. Eileen Furlong
11. Vincent Fusco
12. Richard Gilbertson
13. Peter Goadsby
14. Alain Goriely
15. Alexander Gould
16. Andrew Harrison
17. Jane Hillston
18. Peter Hore
19. Nicholas Jennings
20. Sandra Knapp
21. Susan Lea
22. Paul Lehner
23. Andrew Livingston
24. Jürgen Maier
25. Roberto Maiolino
26. Oscar Marín
27. Angelos Michaelides
28. Irene Miguel-Aliaga
29. Mark Newman
30. Rachel O'Reilly
31. Menelas Pangalos
32. Robert Pressey
33. Trevor Price
34. Oliver Pybus
35. Jordan Raff
36. Andrew Rambaut
37. Ros Rickaby
38. Richard Robson
39. Yvonne Rogers
40. Jamie Rossjohn
41. Paul Seymour
42. Ben Sheldon
43. Ian Shipsey
44. Kate Storey
45. Ilya Sutskever
46. Michael Thackeray
47. Zeblon Vilakazi
48. Carola G. Vinuesa
49. Vaclav Vitek
50. Sally Ward
51. Rachel Wood

== Honorary Fellows ==
1. Tedros Ghebreyesus, Director General, World Health Organization

== Foreign Members ==
1. Charles Bennett
2. Donald Canfield
3. Titia de Lange
4. George Gao
5. Michael Grätzel
6. Hiroshi Hamada
7. Maria Leptin
8. Carlos Nobre
9. Peter Scholze
10. Howard Stone
