= List of fellows of the Royal Society elected in 1664 =

This is a list of fellows of the Royal Society elected in its fifth year, 1664.

== Fellows ==
- Sir Robert Atkyns (1647–1711)
- Nicholas Bagenall (1629–1712)
- Charles Boyle (1639–1694)
- Gilbert Burnett (1643–1715)
- James Carkesse (1657–1675)
- Sir Winston Churchill (1620–1688)
- John Cutler (1608–1693)
- Joseph Glanvill (1636–1680)
- Sir William Godolphin (1635–1696)
- John Hay (1626–1697)
- John Hervey (1616–1680)
- Johannes Hevelius (1611–1687)
- James Hoare (1620–1696)
- Sir John Lowther (1642–1706)
- Henry More (1614–1687)
- Thomas Neale (1641–1699)
- John Newburgh (1630–1692)
- Sir William Portman (1643–1690)
- Thomas Rolt (1641–1672)
- Sir Nicholas Slanning, 1st Baronet (1643–1691)
- Edward Smith (fl. 1664–1668)
- Thomas Thynne (1640–1714)
- Isaacus Vossius (1618–1689)
- Roger Williams (d. 1665)
- Samuel Woodford (1636–1700)
