= Samuel Milner =

British physicist (1875–1958)

- Born: Samuel Roslington Milner; 22 August 1875; Dodworth, Yorkshire
- Died: 12 August 1958 (aged 82); Sydney, Australia
- Known for: Physics of electrolytes and electromagnetic fields
- Awards: Fellow of the Royal Society (1922)
- Scientific career
- Institutions: University of Manchester; University of Sheffield

Samuel Roslington Milner FRS (22 August 1875 – 12 August 1958) (known as 'Ross') was a British physicist, who worked in plasma physics, studying the electrical conductivity of electrolytes. He is best known for the Debye-Milner Plasma Theory.

== Personal life and education ==
Milner was born in Dodsworth, a village near Barnsley, Yorkshire. His father, Samuel Wilkinson Milner, was an agent, or ‘factor’ for the collieries in the district and his mother was Ann Roslington. The Milners had four daughters followed by their only son. When Milner was still young the family moved to Retford, Nottinghamshire. Milner was educated at King Edward VI School. He won the Headmaster's Prize of a microscope, but he quickly moved to studying physics.

Milner later attended University College, Bristol where he met his wife Winifred Esther Walker in 1894 as Physics students. They were both active student leaders and helped open the College's Social and Debating Society to both sexes. In 1894–95 Winifred served as Vice-President and Ross as a committee member. By the next year, he was President and she his Vice-President. Milner and Walker both held 1851 Exhibition Scholarships (established by Queen Victoria to support science). Walker graduated in 1898.

Milner went on to study for his DSc at the University of Göttingen with Walther Nernst who went on to win a Nobel Prize for Chemistry.

In 1952, Milner emigrated with his wife to Sydney, Australia to join their son, Christopher J Milner (1912–1998), who had taken up the position of Chair of Applied Physics at the University of New South Wales.

== Career ==
Milner worked in plasma physics, studying the electrical conductivity of electrolytes. He developed a mathematical formula for the interionic forces between dissolved ions and solvent. He is best known for the Debye-Milner Plasma Theory. Milner's plasma theory (1912) was used by Debye and Huckel (1923) in developing their theory of electrolytes. Milner's records and papers (1944–64) are held in the National Archives.

He was a lecturer at the University of Manchester and later at University of Sheffield from 1917 until his retirement in 1940. He was elected to be a Fellow of the Royal Society (FRS) in 1922.

- 1851 Exhibition Scholar, 1895–1898
- Demonstrator of Physics, University of Manchester, 1898
- Lecturer in Physics, 1900, Acting Professor, 1917, Professor of Physics, 1921–1940, then Emeritus Professor, University of Sheffield
- Assistant Radiographer, 3rd Northern General Hospital, 1914–1917
