= List of fellows of the Royal Society elected in 1779 =

Fellows of the Royal Society elected in 1779.

== Fellows ==
1. Robert Bromfield (d. 1786)
2. George Buxton (1730–1805), physicist
3. Tiberius Cavallo (1745–1809), Italian physicist
4. Henry Dagge (b. c.1715)
5. Josias Dupre (1721–1780), Governor of Madras
6. John Duroure (c.1751–1801)
7. John Eardley-Wilmot (1750–1815), barrister
8. Samuel Farr (1741–1795), physician
9. William Fullarton (1754–1808), soldier and diplomat
10. James Glenie (1750–1817), Scottish businessman
11. John Grant
12. Edward Whitaker Gray (1748–1806), librarian
13. Hugh Hamersley (d. 1790)
14. John Henniker, 1st Baron Henniker (1724–1803)
15. John Jebb (1736–1786), physician and reformer
16. John Jennings
17. Andrew Kippis (1726–1795), clergyman
18. James Murray (c.1722–1794), Governor of Quebec
19. Ralph Payne, 1st Baron Lavington (1738–1807)
20. Joseph Poli (1746–1825)
21. John Joshua Proby, 1st Earl of Carysfort (1751–1828)
22. Charles Rainsford (1728–1809), Army officer
23. Robert Richardson (1732–1781) prebendary, Lincoln Cathedral
24. John Robertson (1741–1823), physician
25. William Seward (1747–1799), anecdotist
26. Samuel Foart Simmons (1750–1813), physician
27. James Carmichael Smyth (1741–1821), Scottish physician
28. Benjamin Thompson, Count Rumford (1753–1814)
29. John Topham (1746–1803)
30. Michael Tyson (1740–1780), clergyman
31. Thomas Vage (d. 1815)
32. Thomas Francis Wenman (1745–1796), natural historian
33. John Whitehurst (1713–1788), clockmaker
