= List of fellows of the Royal Society elected in 2021 =

This article lists fellows of the Royal Society who were elected in 2021.

== Fellows ==
1. Julie Ahringer
2. Glen Barber
3. Paul Bates
4. Richard Benton
5. William Bond
6. Ian L. Boyd
7. Nigel Brandon
8. Peter Campbell
9. Frank Close
10. David Craik
11. Donald B. Dingwell
12. Connie Eaves
13. Sadaf Farooqi
14. Ten Feizi
15. Michael Finnis
16. Julie Forman-Kay
17. Jane Francis
18. Vernonica Franklin-Tong
19. Usha Goswami
20. Hugh Griffiths
21. Andy Haldane
22. Geoffrey Hall
23. Karen Heywood
24. Adrian V. S. Hill
25. Richard B. Horne, head
26. Gregory Houseman
27. Rebecca Kilner
28. Roger Lemon
29. Fiona Marshall
30. Thomas Muir
31. Frances Platt
32. Jeremy Quastel
33. Marilyn Renfree
34. David Rowitch
35. Richard Samworth
36. Sjors Scheres
37. Bernard F. Schutz
38. Abigail Sellen
39. David Silver
40. Benjamin Simons
41. Endre Süli
42. Richard S. Sutton
43. Christopher G. Tate
44. Philip Torr, Professor
45. Thirumalai Venkatesan
46. Karen Vogtmann
47. Bruce Weir
48. Simon Wessely
49. Stanley Whittingham
50. Charlotte Williams

== Honorary Fellows ==
1. John Kingman

== Foreign Members ==
1. Stephen J. Benkovic
2. Anny Cazenave
3. Elena Conti
4. Stanley Deser
5. Vishva Dixit
6. Michael I. Jordan
7. V. Narry Kim
8. Sang Yup Lee
9. Giacomo Rizzolatti
10. Claire Voisin
