= List of fellows of the Royal Society elected in 1925 =

This is a list of people elected Fellow of the Royal Society in 1925.

== Fellows ==
- William Ringrose Gelston Atkins
- Sir Charles Arthur Lovatt Evans
- Sir Ralph Howard Fowler
- Francis Arthur Freeth
- Walcot Gibson
- Sir Harold Jeffreys
- Frederic Wood Jones
- James Kenner
- Sir Edward Mellanby
- James Alexander Murray
- Joseph Proudman
- Sir Richard Vynne Southwell
- Leonard James Spencer
- Robin John Tillyard
- Richard Whiddington
