= List of fellows of the Royal Society elected in 2024 =

List of Fellows of the Royal Society

This article lists fellows of the Royal Society who were elected in 2024.

== Fellows ==
1. Simon Aldridge
2. John Aston
3. Frances Balkwill
4. David Bentley (Chief Scientist, Illumina Inc)
5. David Bentley (Professor, University of Colorado Denver)
6. Donna Blackmond
7. Sarah-Jayne Blakemore
8. Helen Blau
9. Martin Blunt
10. Daniel Bradley
11. Emmanuel Breuillard
12. Philip Campbell
13. Brian Cantor
14. Kenneth Carslaw
15. Andrew Carter
16. Patrick Chinnery
17. Yanick Crow
18. Barry Dickson
19. Jo Dunkley
20. Aled Edwards
21. Paul Elliott
22. Alan Evans
23. Rebecca Fitzgerald
24. Andrew Fitzgibbon
25. Michael Garrett
26. Toby Gee
27. Nigel Goldenfeld
28. Anjali Goswami
29. Maria Harrison
30. Richard Hartley
31. Laura Herz
32. David Hodell
33. Saskia Hogenhout
34. Peter Horby
35. Richard Jardine
36. Heidi Johansen Berg
37. Simon Knowles
38. David Komander
39. Daniela Kühn
40. Eric Lauga
41. Chwee Lim
42. Duncan Lorimer
43. Douglas MacFarlane
44. Barbara Maher
45. George Malliaras
46. Ivan Marusic
47. Tamsin Mather
48. Stephen McGrath
49. Pat Monaghan
50. Graham Moore
51. Francis Nimmo
52. Sarah Otto
53. Adrian Owen
54. Lloyd Peck
55. José Penadés
56. Andrew Pollard
57. Oscar Randal-Williams
58. Keith Ridgway
59. Tom Rodden
60. Stuart Rowan
61. Simon Segars
62. Yang Shi
63. Lorraine Symington
64. Sarah Tabrizi
65. Patrick Unwin
66. Mihaela van der Schaar
67. Bart Vanhaesebroeck
68. Glynn Winskel
69. William Wisden
70. Xiaodong Zhang

== Honorary Fellows ==
1. Kwame Anthony Appiah
2. Anthony Hughes

== Foreign Members ==
1. Yakir Aharonov
2. Adriaan Bax
3. Rene Bernards
4. Emily A. Carter
5. Emmanuelle Charpentier
6. Patrick Cramer
7. Ingrid Daubechies
8. Anthony Fauci
9. Thomas Henzinger
10. Ruth Lehmann
11. Susana Magallón
12. Michael Mann
13. Anthony Movshon
14. William D. Nix
15. Kyoko Nozaki
16. Jian-Wei Pan
17. Aviv Regev
18. Ares Rosakis
19. Paul Schulze-Lefert
20. Erin Schuman
21. Mark H. Thiemens
22. Cesar Victora
