= List of fellows of the Royal Society elected in 1773 =

This is a list of fellows of the Royal Society elected in 1773.

== Fellows ==
1. Edward Bancroft (1744–1821), American physician and chemist
2. Thomas Butterworth Bayley (1744–1802), agriculturalist
3. John Bethune (1724–1774), clergyman
4. Richard Blyke (died 1775), antiquary
5. Patrick Brydone (1736–1818), Scottish traveller
6. Charles Burney (1726–1814), music historian
7. Jeremiah Dixon (1726–1782), astronomer
8. Thomas Dummer (c.1740–1781), MP
9. Francis Duroure (1715–1808)
10. William Benson Earle (1740–1796), philanthropist
11. William Falconer (1744–1824), physician
12. Heneage Finch, 4th Earl of Aylesford (1751–1812)
13. Sir Thomas Frankland, 6th Baronet (1750–1831), MP
14. Alexander Garden (1730–1791), naturalist
15. William Henly
16. Alexander, Baron Hume-Campbell (1750–1781)
17. John Ives (1751–1776), antiquarian
18. John Coakley Lettsom (1744–1815), physician
19. Ashton Lever (1729–1788), collector
20. John Lind (1737–1781), barrister
21. Peter Livius (1727–1795), Chief Justice of Quebec
22. Jean-André Deluc (1727–1817), Swiss geologist
23. Lucius Henry O'Brien (1731–1795), MP
24. Francis Osborne, 5th Duke of Leeds (1751–1799)
25. Jacob Preston (d. 1787)
26. Jean-Baptiste Le Roy (1720–1800)
27. John Smith (1744–1807)
28. Jacob de Stehelin (1710–1785), Russian Academy of Sciences
29. Watkin Williams-Wynn (1749–1789)
30. Other Hickman Windsor, 5th Earl of Plymouth (1751–1799)
31. John Yorke (1728–1801), MP
