= List of fellows of the Royal Society elected in 1820 =

This article lists fellows of the Royal Society elected in 1820.

== Fellows ==
1. John Charles Althorp, 3rd Earl Spencer (1782–1845)
2. Henry Card (1779–1844)
3. Loftus Longueville Tottenham Clarke (?1794–1863)
4. Sir George Cockburn, 10th Baronet (1772–1853), Royal Navy officer
5. Thomas Frederick Colby (1784–1852)
6. John Corrie (?1769–1839), clergyman
7. Fearon Fallows (1788–1831), astronomer
8. Robert Townsend Farquhar (1776–1830), merchant, Governor and MP
9. George Augustus Frederick FitzClarence, 1st Earl of Munster (1794–1842)
10. William Franklin (?1765–1733), physician
11. Matthew Curling Friend (1792–1871), Royal Navy officer
12. George IV, King of Great Britain and Ireland (1762–1830), Royal member
13. Henry Goulburn (1784–1856)
14. Francis Haggitt (d. 1825), clergyman
15. Sir John Hall, 5th Baronet (1787–1860)
16. John Philips Higman (1793–1855)
17. Alexander Kyd (c.1754–1826)
18. Thomas Frankland Lewis (1780–1855)
19. John MacCulloch (1773–1835), Scottish geologist
20. Henry Edward Napier (1789–1853)
21. Evan Nepean (1751–1822)
22. George Henry Noehden (1770–1826)
23. Thomas Phillipps (1792–1872), antiquary
24. Charles Milner Ricketts (1776–1867)
25. John Sewell (c.1766–1833), judge
26. John George Shaw-Lefevre (1797–1879)
27. John Sleath (1767–1847)
28. William Swainson (1789–1855)
29. John Deas Thomson (c.1763–1838)
30. John Maxwell Tylden (1787–1866), Army officer
31. James Watt (1769–1848)
32. William Whewell (1794–1866)

== Foreign members ==
1. Nicolas Theodore de Saussure (1767–1845)
