= List of fellows of the Royal Society elected in 1690 =

This is a list of fellows of the Royal Society elected in 1690.

== Fellow ==
- Jacobus Grandi (1646–1691)
