= List of fellows of the Royal Society elected in 1798 =

This is a list of fellows of the Royal Society elected in 1798.

== Fellows ==
.
1. Adam Afzelius (1751–1837), Swedish physician/botanist
2. Alexander Duncan (1758–1832), H.E.I.C surgeon
3. Finlay Fergusson
4. Prince Demetrius Gallitzin (1738–1803), Russian ambassador
5. Nicholas Gay (d. 1803)
6. Thomas Greene (1737–1810, antiquarian
7. Henry Gregg, barrister (c.1759–1826)
8. Benjamin Hobhouse (1757–1831), barrister and MP
9. Samuel Jackson, surgeon
10. Stephen Lee (d. 1835), astronomer
11. Martin van Marum (1750–1837), Dutch physician
12. William Mudge (1762–1820), Army surveyor
13. William Paterson (1755–1810), Army officer
14. John Rennie the Elder (1761–1821), civil engineer
15. John Ryan (d. 1808)
16. Johann Hieronymus Schroter (1745–1816), German astronomer
