= List of fellows of the Royal Society elected in 1731 =

Fellows of the Royal Society elected in 1731.

== Fellows ==
1. John Amman (1707–1741)
2. Joseph Ayloffe (1709–1781)
3. Benjamin Bathurst (died 1767)
4. William Bentinck (1704–1774)
5. Charles Calvert (1699–1751)
6. Benedict Leonard Calvert (1700–1732)
7. William Fellowes (1705–1775)
8. Hieronymus Giuntini (died 1744)
9. Philip Joseph Kinski (1700–1749)
10. Coote Molesworth (1695–1782)
11. Robert James Petre (1713–1742)
12. Mårten Triewald (1691–1747)
13. Francis I, Holy Roman Emperor (1708–1765)
