= List of fellows of the Royal Society elected in 1696 =

This is a list of fellows of the Royal Society elected in 1696.

== Fellows ==
- Silvestro Bonfigliuoli (1637–1696)
- Ippolito Fornasari (1628–1697)
- James Chadwick (1660–1697)
- Vincenzo Viviani (1622–1703)
- Charles Bernard (1650–1711)
- Francesco Spoleti (d. 1712)
- Govard Bidloo (1649–1713)
- John Harris (1666–1719)
- Edward Smith (1665–1720)
- Ralph Lowndes (1662–1727)
- Orlando Bridgeman (d. 1731)
- Thomas Foley 1st Baron Foley of Kidderminster (d. 1733)
- Sir Philip Ryley (d. 1733)
- John Newey (1664–1735)
- Hugh Howard (1675–1737)
- William Cockburn (1669–1739)
- William Byrd (1674–1744)
- Henry Petty 1st Earl of Shelburne (1675–1751)
- Pomponio Scarlotti Baron of (b. 1696)
