= List of fellows of the Royal Society elected in 1665 =

This is a list of fellows of the Royal Society elected in its sixth year, 1665.

== Fellows ==
- Thomas Blount (b. 1604)
- Sir Philippe Carteret (1642–1672)
- Sir Richard Corbet (1640–1683)
- Daniel Coxe (1640–1730)
- John Dolben (1625–1686)
- Vital de Dumas (1665–1675)
- Sir William Hayward (1617–1704)
- Humphrey Henchman (1592–1675)
- William Howard (1612–1680)
- Charles Howard (1629–1685)
- Edward Hyde (1609–1674)
- Hugues Louis De Lionne (b. 1665)
- George Monck (1608–1670)
- Edward Montagu (1602–1671)
- Samuel Pepys (1633–1703)
- Prince Rupert (1619–1682)
- Richard Sackville (1622–1677)
- Gilbert Sheldon (1598–1677)
- Richard Stearne (1596–1683)
- Malachy Thruston (1628–1701)
- Sir Theodore de Vaux (1628–1694)
- James II (1633–1701)
- Ferdinand Albert (1636–1687)
- Charles II (1630–1686)
