= List of fellows of the Royal Society elected in 1691 =

This is a list of fellows of the Royal Society elected in 1691.

== Fellows ==
- Thomas Day (1656–1696)
- Louis Paule (1691–1702)
- Sir Godfrey Copley (1653–1709)
- Alexander Torriano (1667–1717)
- Luigi Ferdinand Marsigli, Count (1658–1730)
