= List of fellows of the Royal Society elected in 1697 =

This is a list of fellows of the Royal Society elected in 1697.

== Fellows ==
- George Stepney (1663–1707)
- John Hutton (d. 1712) Scottish physician and MP
- Jacques Basnage de Beauval (1653–1722)
- Ralph Thoresby (1658–1725)
- Abraham de Moivre (1667–1754)
