= List of fellows of the Royal Society elected in 1685 =

This is a list of fellows of the Royal Society elected in 1685.

== Fellows ==
- Esprit Cabart de Villermont (1617–1707)
- Sir Richard Bulkeley (1660–1710)
- John Vaughan 3rd Earl of Carbery (1639–1713)
- Charles Leigh (1662–1717)
- John Beaumont (d. 1731)
- Thomas Herbert 8th Earl of Pembroke and 5th Earl of Montgomery (1656–1733)
- Sir Hans Sloane (1660–1753)
