= List of fellows of the Royal Society elected in 1913 =

This is a complete list of the fellows and foreign members of the Royal Society elected in 1913.

== Fellows ==
- Vernon Herbert Blackman
- William Bulloch
- David Leonard Chapman
- William Ernest Dalby
- Thomas Renton Elliott
- John Charles Fields
- Sir John Smith Flett
- James Peter Hill
- Arthur Robert Hinks
- Sir Frederick William Keeble
- Sir Arthur Keith
- Keith Lucas
- Sir Owen Willans Richardson
- Walter Rosenhain
- George Walker Walker

== Foreign members ==
- Charles Eugene Barrois
- Henry Louis Le Chatelier
- Pierre Paul Emile Roux
- Simon Schwendener
- Woldemar Voigt
