= List of fellows of the Royal Society elected in 1924 =

This is a list of people elected Fellow of the Royal Society in 1924.

== Fellows ==
- Henry Balfour
- Joseph Edwin Barnard
- James Fairlie Gemmill
- Mervyn Henry Gordon
- Percy Groom
- Sir Christopher Kelk Ingold
- Percy Fry Kendall
- Louis Vessot King
- Louis Joel Mordell
- Thomas Slater Price
- Sir Chandrasekhara Venkata Raman
- Leonard James Rogers
- Alexander Russell
- Charles Edward Spearman
- Frank Twyman

== Statute 12 ==
- Sir Otto John Beit
- David Alexander Edward Lindsay, 27th Earl of Crawford and 10th Earl of Balcarres
