= List of fellows of the Royal Society elected in 1684 =

This is a list of fellows of the Royal Society elected in 1684.

== Fellows ==
- James Monson (1660–1688)
- Thomas Baker (1625?–1690)
- Richard Beaumont (1654–1692)
- Nicolas Fremont d’Ablancourt (1621–1696)
- Henry Hyde 2nd Earl of Clarendon (1638–1709)
- William Musgrave (1655–1721)
- Alexander Pitfeild (1658–1728)
- Tancred Robinson (c.1658–1748)
- Benjamin von Munchausen (b. 1684)
