= List of fellows of the Royal Society elected in 1902 =

This is a list of fellows of the Royal Society elected in 1902.

== Fellows ==
- Ferdinand von Richthofen (1833–1905)
- Hans Peter Jurgen Julius Thomsen (1826–1909)
- Edward Saunders (1848–1910)
- John Brown (1850–1911)
- Rubert William Boyce (1863–1911)
- Henry Taylor Bovey (1850–1912)
- George William Hill (1838–1914)
- Herman Graf zu Solms-Laubach (1842–1915)
- Richard Everard Webster Viscount Alverstone (1842–1915)
- Sir James Stirling (1836–1916)
- Jean Gaston Darboux (1842–1917)
- Karl Ewald Konstantin Hering (1834–1918)
- Sydney Samuel Hough (1870–1923)
- Robert Kidston (1852–1924)
- Walter Hume Long 1st Viscount Long of Wraxall (1854–1924)
- Sir George Dashwood Taubman Goldie (1846–1925)
- Albert Abraham Michelson (1852–1931)
- Sir Horace Curzon Plunkett (1854–1932)
- Sir William Bate Hardy (1864–1934)
- Herbert Brereton Baker (1862–1935)
- Thomas Mather (1856–1937)
- Alfred Harker (1859–1939)
- Sir William Jackson Pope (1870–1939)
- Waldemar Christofer Brogger (1851–1940)
- John Henry Michell (1863–1940)
- Sir William Matthew Flinders Petrie (1853–1942)
- Arthur Willey (1867–1942)
- Hugh Frank Newall (1857–1944)
