= List of fellows of the Royal Society elected in 1771 =

This is a list of fellows of the Royal Society elected in 1771.

== Fellows ==
1. John Wynn Baker (d. 1775), agriculture economist
2. Peter Biron, Duke of Courland (1724–1800), German duke
3. Alexander Dalrymple (1737–1808), Scottish geographer
4. William Duncan, (c.1715–1774), physician and speculator
5. Robert Erskine (1735–1780), Scottish engineer
6. John Frere (1740–1807), antiquary
7. Richard Cope Hopton (c.1738–1810)
8. Samuel Howard (c.1731–1811), surgeon
9. John Glen King (1732–1787), cleric and antiquarian
10. John Philip de Limbourg (1726–1811)
11. Francis Maseres (1731–1824), lawyer
12. Paul Henry Maty (1745–1787), librarian
13. John Paradise (1743–1795)
14. James Petty (d. 1822)
15. Constantine Phipps, 2nd Baron Mulgrave (1744–1792)
16. Marcin Odlanicki Poczobutt (1728–1810), Polish astronomer
17. Philip Stephens (1723–1809), MP
18. Marmaduke Tunstall (1743–1790), ornithologist
19. Thomas Tyrwhitt (1730–1786), classical scholar
20. George Walker (c.1734–1807), mathematician
21. Benjamin Way (1740–1808), MP
