= List of fellows of the Royal Society elected in 1787 =

This is a list of fellows of the Royal Society elected in 1787.

== Fellows ==
1. John Ash (c.1723–1798), physician
2. William Bentinck (1764–1813)
3. William Blizard (1743–1835)
4. Thomas Gery Cullum (1741–1831)
5. James Duff, 2nd Earl Fife (1729–1809)
6. Ernest II, Duke of Saxe-Gotha-Altenburg (1745–1804)
7. Thomas Erskine, 1st Baron Erskine (1750–1823)
8. William Fordyce (1724–1792), Scottish physician
9. George Trenchard Goodenough (b. 1743)
10. Everard Home (1756–1832)
11. Craven Ord (1756–1832), antiquarian
12. Thomas Parkyns, 1st Baron Rancliffe (1755–1800)
13. William Parsons (d. 1828), poet
14. Arthur Leary Piggott (1748–1819), barrister and MP
15. William Morton Pitt (1754–1836), MP
16. Francis Rawdon Hastings, 1st Marquess of Hastings and 2nd Earl of Moira (1754–1826)
17. Richard Relhan (1754–1823)
18. Richard Anthony Salisbury (1761–1829)
19. James Smithson (1765–1829)
20. Luís Pinto de Sousa Coutinho (1735–1804), Portuguese diplomat
21. George Leonard Staunton (1737–1801)
22. Nicolas Vay de Vaja
23. Alexander Wedderburn, 1st Earl of Rosslyn (1733–1805)
24. Henry Willoughby, 5th Baron Middleton (1726–1800)
