= List of fellows of the Royal Society elected in 1912 =

This is a list of the fellows of the Royal Society elected in 1912. There were no foreign members elected this year.

- John Oliver Arnold
- Charles Glover Barkla
- Leonard Cockayne
- Arthur Lee Dixon
- Sir Thomas Little Heath
- Humphrey Owen Jones
- Sir Thomas Ranken Lyle
- William McDougall
- Rudolf Messel
- Benjamin Moore
- Edward Nettleship
- Robert Newstead
- Sir Henry John Oram
- George Thurland Prior
- Reginald Crundall Punnett
