= List of fellows of the Royal Society elected in 1938 =

This is a list of people elected Fellow of the Royal Society in 1938.

== Royal Fellow ==
- Prince Henry, Duke of Gloucester

== Fellows ==
- Guy Dunstan Bengough
- Charles Best
- William Brown
- Sir James Wilfred Cook
- Thomas Eckersley
- George Finch
- William Ewart Gye
- W. V. D. Hodge
- Sir Julian Huxley
- John Jackson
- Sir Robert Mond
- James Ernest Richey
- Sir Frederick Stratten Russell
- Sir Basil Schonland
- Frank Sturdy Sinnatt
- Kenneth Manley Smith
- Edgar Stedman
- Cecil Edgar Tilley
- W. E. S. Turner
- Herbert Henry Woollard

== Foreign members ==
- John Jacob Abel
- Niels Erik Nørlund

== Statute 12 fellows ==
- Neville Chamberlain
