= List of fellows of the Royal Society elected in 1932 =

This is a list of people elected Fellow of the Royal Society in 1932.

== Fellows ==
- Sir Frederic Charles Bartlett
- Davidson Black
- Frederick William Carter
- William George Fearnsides
- Felix Eugen Fritsch
- Joseph Alexander Gray
- John Burdon Sanderson Haldane
- Douglas Rayner Hartree
- Heinrich Ernst Karl Jordan
- Frederick Robert Miller
- Sir Basil Mott
- Sir John Lionel Simonsen
- Thomas Smith
- Sir Hugh Stott Taylor
- Herbert Westren Turnbull
- Warrington Yorke

== Foreign members ==
- Jacques Hadamard
- Graham Lusk
- Hermann Walther Nernst
- Theobald Smith

== Statute 12 Fellow ==
- Sir Henry Wellcome
