= List of fellows of the Royal Society elected in 1817 =

Fellows of the Royal Society elected in 1817.

== Fellows ==
1. John Baillie (1772–1833)
2. Edward Bromhead (1789–1855), mathematician
3. William Burroughs (d. 1829), barrister
4. George Byng, 6th Viscount Torrington (1768–1831)
5. Joseph Constantine Carpue (1764–1846), surgeon
6. Frederick Sylvester North Douglas (1791–1819), MP
7. Robert Saunders Dundas, 2nd Viscount Melville (1771–1851)
8. Hugh Fortescue, 2nd Earl Fortescue (1783–1861)
9. Augustus Bozzi Granville (1783–1872), physician, writer
10. Edward Hanmer (1758–1821)
11. James Rawlins Johnson (d. 1840)
12. William Lambton (1756–1823), surveyor
13. Thomas Legh (1793–1857), MP
14. John William Mackie (b. c. 1788), Chaplain to Duke of York
15. William Macmichael (1784–1839), physician
16. John Maddy (1766–1853)
17. Macvey Napier (1776–1847), legal scholar
18. Gore Ouseley (1770–1844), diplomat
19. Henry John Peachey, 3rd Baron Selsey (1787–1838)
20. William Henry Francis Petre, 11th Baron Petre (1793–1850)
21. Thomas Stamford Bingley Raffles (1781–1826), founder of Singapore
22. John Reeves (1774–1856), naturalist
23. William Somerville (1771–1860), physician
24. William Strutt (1756–1830), inventor
25. Peter Evan Turnbull (1786–1852)
26. John Ashley Warre (1787–1860)
