= List of fellows of the Royal Society elected in 1933 =

This is a list of people elected Fellow of the Royal Society in 1933.

== Fellows ==
- Patrick Blackett
- James Collip
- R. E. B. Crompton
- Harry Medforth Dawson
- Arthur Thomas Doodson
- H. J. Gough
- Sir John Hammond
- Sir Gordon Morgan Holmes
- Harold King
- John Lennard-Jones
- James Walter McLeod
- Sir Alan Sterling Parkes
- Sir Edward James Salisbury
- Bernard Smith
- William Robin Thompson
- Arthur Mannering Tyndall
- Joseph Wedderburn

== Foreign members ==
- Vilhelm Friman Koren Bjerknes
- Harvey Williams Cushing
- Peter Joseph Wilhelm Debye
- Friedrich August Ferdinand Christian Went

== Statue 12 fellows ==
- Sir Richard Arman Gregory
