= List of fellows of the Royal Society elected in 1711 =

This is a list of fellows of the Royal Society elected in 1711.

== Fellows ==
- Fettiplace Bellers (1687–1752)
- Ludwig Friedrich Bonet (d. 1773)
- William Cheselden (1688–1752)
- Peter Colleton (1643–1718)
- Roger Cotes (1682–1716)
- John Craig (d. 1731)
- Walter Douglas (1670–1739)
- Thomas Greene (d. 1745)
- Samuel Hill (1648–1716)
- William Jones (1675–1749)
- Linda (fl. 1711)
- Alexander Sandilands (d. 1760)
- Marmaduke Wyvill, 5th Baronet (d. 1722)
