= List of fellows of the Royal Society elected in 1721 =

This is a list of fellows of the Royal Society elected in 1721.

== Fellows ==
- William Barrowby (1682–1751)
- John Beale (d. 1724)
- John Browne (d. 1735)
- Paul Dudley (1675–1751)
- William East (fl. 1721–1734)
- George Graham (1673–1751)
- Richard Hale (1670–1728)
- Thomas Hewett (1656–1726)
- George Savile (1678–1743)
- Conrad Joachim Sprengwell (d. 1740)
- William Western (?1694–1729)
- John Thomas Woolhouse (c. 1650–1734)
