= List of fellows of the Royal Society elected in 1799 =

Fellows of the Royal Society elected in 1799.

== Fellows ==
- Archibald Blair (1752–1815), E.I.C astronomer
- David Carnegie (1753–1805)
- James Clark (1755–1817), Scottish physician
- William Drummond (c.1770–1828), diplomat
- Edward Hyde East (1764–1847), barrister
- Philip Hills
- Edward Charles Howard (1774–1816)
- Abraham Mills (c.1750–1828), geologist
- Home Riggs Popham (1762–1820), Royal Navy officer
- Apollon Moussin Puschkin (d. 1805), Russian mineralogist
- Edward Roberts (c.1763–1848), physician
- Joseph Sabine (1770–1837), barrister
- John Stuart, 1st Marquess of Bute (1744–1814)
