= List of fellows of the Royal Society elected in 1921 =

This article lists fellows of the Royal Society elected in 1921.

== Fellows ==
1. Wilfred Eade Agar
2. Francis William Aston
3. Sir William Lawrence Bragg
4. William Thomas Calman
5. Arthur Harry Church
6. Georges Dreyer
7. William Henry Eccles
8. Sir John Charles Grant Ledingham
9. Charles Stewart Middlemiss
10. Kennedy Joseph Previté Orton
11. Sir John Herbert Parsons
12. James Charles Philip
13. Alfred Arthur Robb
14. Sir Eustace Tennyson d'Eyncourt, 1st Baronet
15. Udny Yule

== Foreign members ==
1. Leon Charles Albert Calmette
2. Henri Alexandre Deslandres
3. Albert Einstein
4. Albin Haller
5. Edmund Beecher Wilson
6. Pieter Zeeman
