= List of fellows of the Royal Society elected in 1678 =

This is a list of fellows of the Royal Society elected in its 19th year, 1678.

== Fellows ==
- John Mayow (1640–1679)
- David Hannisius (d. 1681)
- Joseph Moxon (1627–1691)
- Walter Chetwynd (1633–1693)
- Theodor Kerckring (1640–1693)
- William Perry (1650–1696)
- Sir James Langham (1620–1699)
- Edmund Dickenson (1624–1707)
- Dethlevus Cluverus (1645–1708)
- Francis Aston (1644–1715)
- John Van de Bemde (1655–1726)
- Joseph Lane (d. 1728)
- Edmond Halley (1656–1742)
