= List of fellows of the Royal Society elected in 1671 =

This is a list of fellows of the Royal Society elected in its 12th year, 1671.

== Fellows ==
- Nehemiah Grew (1641–1712)
- Martin Lister (1639–1712)
- Sir Philip Matthews (1642–1685)
- Sir Robert Reading (1640–1689)
- Sir John Williams (1642–1680)
