= List of fellows of the Royal Society elected in 1793 =

Fellows of the Royal Society elected in 1793.

== Fellows ==
1. Charles Abbot, 1st Baron Colchester (1757–1829)
2. John Farr Abbott (1757–1794)
3. Samuel Bosanquet (1768–1843
4. Lord Frederick Campbell (1729–1816)
5. John Day (1738–1808)
6. Andrew Douglas (1736–1806)
7. George Gostling (c.1745–1821)
8. Richard Wilson Greatheed
9. John Ingilby (1758–1815)
10. Georg Christoph Lichtenberg (1742–1799)
11. Joseph Mendoza y Rios (1762–1815)
12. Hervey Redmond Morres, 2nd Viscount Mountmorres (c.1746–1797)
13. Richard Richards (1752–1823)
14. William Saunders (1743–1817)
15. John Scott, 1st Earl of Eldon (1751–1838)
16. William Scott, 1st Baron Stowell (1745–1836)
17. Francis Stephens (c.1739–1807)
18. Robert Stearne Tighe (1760–1835)
19. William Charles Wells (1757–1817)
20. William Hyde Wollaston (1766–1828)

== Foreign members ==
1. Johann Friedrich Blumenbach (1752–1840)
