= List of fellows of the Royal Society elected in 1796 =

Fellows of the Royal Society elected in 1796.

== Fellows ==
1. John Abernethy (1764–1831), surgeon.
2. George Annesley, 2nd Earl of Mountnorris (1770–1844), MP
3. John Dalrymple (d. 1798), Admiral of the Blue
4. Sir George Smith Gibbes(1771–1851), physician
5. John Hellins (d. 1827), autodidact, schoolteacher, mathematician, astronomer and country parson.
6. George Holme-Sumner (1760–1831)
7. William Howley (1766–1848), Archbishop of Canterbury
8. William Langford, Eton schoolmaster
9. William Larkins (d. 1800), accountant, HEIC, Bengal
10. William Latham, antiquarian
11. William Lax (1761–1836), astronomer and mathematician
12. Thomas Osbert Mordaunt (1730–1809), Army officer and poet
13. Christopher Robert Pemberton (1765–1822), physician
14. Edward Riou, (1762–1801), Royal Navy officer
15. Samuel Rogers (1763–1855), poet
16. José Correia da Serra (1750–1823), Portuguese ambassador to USA, Finance Minister
17. Robert Smith (1747–1832), solicitor
18. Glocester Wilson (d. c.1852), Barrister at Law and Postmaster General of Jamaica
