= List of fellows of the Royal Society elected in 1919 =

This is a list of fellows of the Royal Society elected in 1919.

== Fellows ==
- Janne Robert Rydberg (1854 -1919)
- Francis Arthur Bainbridge (1874 -1921)
- Marie Ennemond Camille Jordan (1838 -1922)
- Jacobus Cornelius Kapteyn (1851 -1922)
- Sir Maurice Fitzmaurice (1861 -1924)
- Theodore William Richards (1868 -1928)
- Thomas Barlow Wood (1869 -1929)
- John William Evans (1857 -1930)
- William Diller Matthew (1871 -1930)
- Bertram Dillon Steele (1870 -1934)
- George Barger (1878 -1939)
- Charles Gabriel Seligman (1873 -1940)
- Edward Heron-Allen (1861 -1943)
- Thomas Hunt Morgan (1866 -1945)
- Simon Flexner (1863 -1946)
- Francois Antoine Alfred Lacroix (1863 -1948)
- George Stuart Graham-Smith (1875 -1950)
- Sir Charles Frederick Arden-Close (1865 -1952)
- Sergius Winogradsky (1856 -1953)
- Robert Williams Wood (1868 -1955)
- John Christopher Willis (1868 -1958)
- George Neville Watson (1886 -1965)
- Sydney Chapman (1888 -1970)
- Edward VIII "King of Great Britain, Ireland, and the British Dominions beyond the seas, Emperor of India" (1894 -1972)
- Sir Geoffrey Ingram Taylor (1886 -1975)
