= List of fellows of the Royal Society elected in 1704 =

This is a list of fellows of the Royal Society elected in 1704.

== Fellows ==
- Francis Annesley (1663–1750)
- John Arbuthnot (1667–1735)
- Walter Clavell (fl. 1704–1740)
- William Fellowes (1660–1724)
- John Fuller (1680–1745)
- Prince George of Denmark (1653–1708)
- Samuel Morland (d. 1722)
- Andrew Tooke (1673–1732)
