= List of fellows of the Royal Society elected in 1702 =

This is a list of fellows of the Royal Society elected in 1702.

== Fellows ==
- John Chamberlayne (c. 1666–1723)
- Jean Chardellou (c. 1664–1771)
- George Cheyne (1671–1743)
- John Lowthorp (c. 1659–1724)
- Ludlow (fl. 1702)
- Abraham de la Pryme (1672–1704)
- Robert Tompson (c. 1676–1713)
- Michael Le Vassor (c. 1648–1718)
- James Vernon (c. 1677–1756)
- James Yonge (1647–1721)
