= List of fellows of the Royal Society elected in 1918 =

This is a list of people elected Fellow of the Royal Society in 1918.

== Fellows ==
- Charles Bolton
- Sir Henry Cort Harold Carpenter
- Thomas Algernon Chapman
- Cecil Clifford Dobell
- Ernest Gold
- Henry Brougham Guppy
- Sir Albert George Hadcock
- Archibald Vivian Hill
- Sir James Colquhoun Irvine
- Sir Gerald Ponsonby Lenox-Conyngham
- Sir Thomas Lewis
- Srinivasa Aaiyangar Ramanujan
- Arthur William Rogers
- Samuel Smiles
- Sir Frank Edward Smith

== Foreign members ==
- William Wallace Campbell
- Grove Karl Gilbert
- Luigi Luciani
- Jean Baptiste Perrin
- Paul Sabatier
