= List of fellows of the Royal Society elected in 1891 =

Fellows of the Royal Society elected in 1891.

== Fellows ==
1. William Anderson (1835–1898)
2. Frederick Orpen Bower (1855–1948)
3. John Conroy (1845–1900)
4. Daniel John Cunningham (1850–1909)
5. George Mercer Dawson (1849–1901)
6. Edwin Bailey Elliott (1851–1937)
7. Percy Faraday Frankland (1858–1946)
8. Percy Carlyle Gilchrist (1851–1935)
9. William Dobinson Halliburton (1860–1931)
10. James Hannen (1821–1894)
11. Oliver Heaviside (1850–1925)
12. William Lawies Jackson (1840–1917)
13. John Edward Marr (1857–1933)
14. Ludwig Mond (1839–1909)
15. Sir William Napier Shaw (1854–1945)
16. Silvanus Phillips Thompson (1851–1916)
17. Thomas Henry Tizard (1839–1924)

== Foreign members ==
1. Alexander Agassiz (1835–1910) ForMemRS
2. Benjamin Apthorp Gould (1824–1896) ForMemRS
3. Eduard Adolf Strasburger (1844–1912) ForMemRS
4. Pietro Tacchini (1838–1905) ForMemRS
