= Richard Blyke =

Richard Blyke (died 1775) was an English official and antiquary.

== Life ==
The son of Theophilus Blyke, deputy secretary-at-war, he was a native of Hereford. He became deputy-auditor of the office of the Imprest; and was a Fellow of the Royal Society and Fellow of the Society of Antiquaries of London. He was a member of the committee appointed to prepare the Rolls of Parliament for the press.

Blyke died in 1775, and was buried in the churchyard of Isleworth, Middlesex.

== Works ==
Blyke edited, with John Topham, John Glanville's Reports of Determinations on Contested Elections (1775). He also made manuscript collections, in 22 volumes, for a topographical history of Herefordshire. These were purchased at the sale of his library by Charles Howard, 11th Duke of Norfolk.
