= List of fellows of the Royal Society elected in 1718 =

This is a list of fellows of the Royal Society elected in 1718.

== Fellows ==
- John Bamber (c. 1667–1753)
- Thomas Bates (d. c. 1760)
- William Beckett (1684–1738)
- James Bradley (1693–1762)
- Thomas Bury (1655–1722)
- Charles Cadogan, 2nd Baron Cadogan (1685–1776)
- James Campbell (d. 1733)
- John Conduitt (1688–1737)
- Caleb Cotesworth (d. 1741)
- Samuel Cruwys (d. 1747)
- Robert Gay (d. 1738)
- Stephen Hales (?1677–1761)
- John Hollier (c. 1687–c. 1722)
- Antoine de Jussieu (1686–1758)
- Thomas Fantet de Lagny (1660–?1734)
- Sir Wilfrid Lawson, 3rd Baronet, of Isell (1697–1737)
- John Heinrich Linck (1674–1734)
- Pietro Antonio Michelotti (1680–1740)
- James Mickleton (fl. 1718)
- John Montagu, 2nd Duke of Montagu (1690–1749)
- Ludovicus a Ripa (d. 1746)
- Nicholas Saunderson (1682–1739)
- William Stephens (c. 1693–1760)
- William Stukeley (1687–1765)
- William Wagstaffe (1685–1725)
- Robert Welsted (1671–1735)
- John Whiteside (?1679–?1729)
