= List of fellows of the Royal Society elected in 1705 =

This is a list of fellows of the Royal Society elected in 1705.

== Fellows ==
- Francis Hauksbee (c. 1666–1713)
- Gilbert Heathcote (1652–1733)
- William King (1650–1729)
- Dacre Barret Lennard (d. 1733)
- John Mortimer (c. 1656–1736)
- William Nicolson (1655–1727)
- John Thorpe (1682–1750)
- Henry Worsley (c. 1675–1740), Army officer, MP and Governor of Barbados
