= List of fellows of the Royal Society elected in 1715 =

This is a list of fellows of the Royal Society elected in 1715.

== Fellows ==
- Jacques d'Allonville (1671–1732)
- George Cholmondeley, 2nd Earl of Cholmondeley (c. 1666–1733)
- Antonio Schinella Conti (1677–1749)
- Justus van Effen (? 1684–1735)
- Claude Joseph Geoffroy (1685–1752)
- John Godfey (fl. 1715)
- James Hamilton, 7th Earl of Abercorn (1686–1744)
- Thomas Hodges (fl. 1715–1720)
- Paul Jacob Marperger (1683–1767)
- Pierre Remond de Montmort (1678–1719)
- John Noore (fl. 1715–1734)
- Francis Pemberton (? 1679–1762)
- Friedrich Ruysch (1638–1731)
- Willem 's Gravesande (1688–1742)
- John Sherlock (d. 1719)
- Bruno Tozzi (1656–1743)
- Nicolo Troni (1685–1772)
- Michaele Bernado Valentini (1657–1729)
- Levinus Vincent (1658–1728)
- Francois Wicardel, Chevalier de Fleury (1715–1754)
