= List of fellows of the Royal Society elected in 1713 =

This is a list of Fellows of the Royal Society elected in 1713.

== Fellows ==
- Louis D'Aumont de Rochebaron (1667–1723)
- Giovanni Antonio, Count Baldini (1654–1725)
- Richard Barrett (fl. 1713)
- Francesco Bianchini (1662–1729)
- John Colson (1680–1760)
- John Inglis (d. 1740)
- Daniel Ernest Jablonski (1660–1741)
- Von Kreienberg (d. 1743)
- Cotton Mather (1663–1728)
- Pierre de Mellarede (c. 1659–1730)
- Charles Oliphant (c. 1666–1720)
- John Poulett, 1st Earl Poulett (1668–1743)
- Iver Rosenkrantz (1674–1745)
- Henry St. John, Viscount Bolingbroke (1678–1751)
- George Tollet (c. 1684–1714)
