= List of fellows of the Royal Society elected in 1682 =

This is a list of fellows of the Royal Society elected in 1682.

== Fellows ==
- Coenraad van Beuningen (1622–1693)
- Edward Paget (1652–1703)
- Giuseppe de Faria (d. 1703)
- Sir John Chardin (1643–1712)
- Robert Pitt (1653–1713)
- John Turnor (1660–1719)
- Walter Mills (1654–1726)
- Marcantonio Borghese Principe di Sulmona e Rossano (1660–1729)
- Muhammad ibn Haddu (fl. 1682)
