= List of fellows of the Royal Society elected in 1895 =

Fellows of the Royal Society elected in 1895.

== Fellows ==
1. Alfred Gibbs Bourne (1859–1940)
2. George Hartley Bryan (1864–1928)
3. Horace Davey (1833–1907)
4. John Eliot (1839–1908)
5. Joseph Reynolds Green (1848–1914)
6. Ernest Howard Griffiths (1851–1932)
7. Charles Thomas Heycock (1858–1931)
8. Sydney John Hickson (1859–1940)
9. Henry Capel Lofft Holden (1856–1937)
10. William Macewen (1848–1924)
11. Sidney Harris Cox Martin (1860–1924)
12. Frank McClean (1837–1904)
13. George Minchin Minchin (1845–1914)
14. William Henry Power (1842–1916)
15. Thomas Purdie (1843–1916)
16. John Wolfe Barry (1836–1918)

== Foreign members ==
1. Jean Albert Gaudry (1827–1908)
2. Friedrich Wilhelm Georg Kohlrausch (1840–1910)
3. Samuel Pierpont Langley (1834–1906)
4. Marius Sophus Lie (1842–1899)
5. Elias Metchnikoff (1845–1916)
