= List of fellows of the Royal Society elected in 1778 =

This is a list of fellows of the Royal Society elected in 1778.

== Fellows ==
1. John Alstroemer (1742–1786)
2. Wade Toby Caulfeild (1732–1800)
3. Thomas Cave (1737–1780), naturalist
4. Henry Dawkins (c.1728–1814), MP
5. Matthew Dobson (1732–1784)
6. John Douglas (1721–1807), Bishop of Salisbury
7. Joseph Else (d. 1780), anatomist
8. Henry Charles Englefield (1752–1822), antiquary
9. Anthony Fothergill (1732–1813), physician
10. Archibald Campbell Fraser (1736–1815), consul and MP
11. Thomas de Grey, 2nd Baron Walsingham (1748–1818), politician
12. Alexander Hay, physician
13. Benjamin Heath (d. 1817), Headmaster of Harrow school
14. Robert Banks Hodgkinson (c.1721–1822)
15. William Augustus Howard (d. 1800)
16. Charles Peter Layard (1749–1903), Dean of Bristol
17. John Lockman (c.1721–1807), canon
18. Joseph Nash (d. 1782)
19. Henry Partridge (d. 1803), barrister
20. William Preston (1729–1789), Bishop of Leighlin and Ferns
21. Lancelot Shadwell (d. 1815)
22. Robert Boyle-Walsingham (1736–1780), Naval officer and MP
23. James Watson (1748–1796), lawyer
24. Richard Worsley (1751–1805), MP
25. William Wright (1735–1819), botanist
26. John Wyatt (d. 1797), surgeon
