= List of fellows of the Royal Society elected in 1726 =

This is a list of fellows of the Royal Society elected in 1726.

== Fellows ==
- Richard Beard (c1688–1734), physician
- Bernard Forest de Belidor (1698–1761), French engineer
- Sir William Billers (died 1745), Alderman, Sheriff and Lord Mayor of London
- Zabdiel Boylston (1679–1766), colonial physician (Massachusetts)
- Sir Brook Bridges (1679–1728), barrister
- Kingsmill Eyre (1682–1743), Secretary of Chelsea Hospital and inventor
- Henry Walther Gerdes (1690–1742), German pastor
- Sir Jeffrey Gilbert (1674–1726), Chief Baron of the Exchequer
- Richard Graham (1693–1749), Comptroller of Westminster Bridge
- James Hargraves (1690–1741), Dean of Chichester
- Richard Hassell (died 1770)
- Richard Holland (1688–1730), physician
- John Jeffreys (died 1741)
- Robert Johnston Ketelbey (died 1743), barrister
- Thomas Palmer (c1685–1735), Recorder and MP of Bridgwater
- Edward Pawlet (died 1768), barrister
- Thomas Robinson (1703–1777), politician, architect and collector
- Edward Rudge (1703–1763), MP
- Meyer Low Schomberg (1690–1761), German physician in London
- Charles Stanhope (1673–1760) (1673–1760), barrister and MP
- Temple Stanyan (c1677–1752), author and politician
- James Stirling (1692–1770), mathematician
- Thomas White (died 1754), Clerk of the Errors
