= List of fellows of the Royal Society elected in 1829 =

Fellows of the Royal Society elected in 1829.

== Fellows ==
1. Francis Basset (1757–1835)
2. Joseph Bosworth (1789–1876)
3. William Cavendish (1808–1891)
4. Henry Coddington (d. 1845)
5. William Willoughby Cole (1807–1886)
6. Bransby Blake Cooper (1792–1853)
7. Alexander Crombie (1762–1840)
8. William Frederick Edwards (1776–1842)
9. John Elliotson (1791–1868)
10. George Evelyn (1791–1829)
11. John Forbes (1787–1861)
12. Henry Hennell (d. 1842)
13. George Henry Hutchinson (d. 1852)
14. John William Lubbock (1803–1865)
15. Ebenezer Fuller Maitland (1780–1858)
16. John Maxwell (1791–1865)
17. Charles Phillips (d. 1840)
18. William Pole (1798–1884)
19. Sir David Pollock (1780–1847)
20. Isaac Robinson (d. 1839)
21. John Robert Steuart (d. 1853)
22. John Stuart-Wortley (1801–1855)
23. Charles Tennyson-d'Eyncourt (1784–1861)
24. Nathaniel Wallich (1786–1854)
25. Alexander Luard Wollaston (1804–1874)

== Foreign members ==
1. Antoine Laurent de Jussieu (1748–1836) formemrs
