= List of fellows of the Royal Society elected in 1699 =

This is a list of fellows of the Royal Society elected in 1699.

== Fellows ==
- Robert Shirley (1673–1699)
- John Lowther 1st Viscount Lonsdale (1655–1700)
- Reeve Williams (1682–1703)
- Charles Sackville 6th Earl of Dorset (1638–1706)
- William Cowper (1666–1709)
- James Cunningham (1667–1709)
- David Krieg (1669–1710)
- Thomas Browne (1673–1710)
- Pierre Silvestre (1662–1718)
- James Pound (1669–1724)
- Martin Bowes (1671–1726)
- Johann Burchard Menkenius (1675–1732)
- Edward Worth (1678–1733)
- George Andre Agricola (1672–1738)
- Paul Buissiere (1655–1739)
