= List of fellows of the Royal Society elected in 1675 =

This is a list of fellows of the Royal Society elected in its 16th year, 1675.

== Fellows ==
- Sir Philip Percivale (1656–1680)
- Daniel Milles (1626–1689)
- George Savile 1st Marquess of Halifax (1633–1695)
- Sir Paul Whichcote, 2nd Baronet (1643–1721)
