= Saskia Hogenhout =

Dutch professor of entomology and ecology

Saskia Hogenhout FRS
- Born: Saskia A. Hogenhout; March 10, 1969 (age 57)
- Education: Vrije Universiteit Amsterdam (MSc); Wageningen University (PhD)
- Scientific career
- Fields: Biology; Plant Genetics; Entomology
- Workplaces: Ohio State University; John Innes Centre
- Thesis: The molecular basis of the interactions between luteoviruses and their aphid vectors (1999)
- Website: www.jic.ac.uk/people/saskia-hogenhout

Saskia A. Hogenhout FRS (born 1969), is a Dutch professor of entomology and ecology specialising in molecular plant, microbe and insect interactions.

== Education and career ==
Hogenhout was educated at Vrije Universiteit Amsterdam with an MSc in Biology in 1994, her PhD looked at the molecular basis of luteovirus-aphid interactions and was awarded at Wageningen University in 1999.

== Career and research ==
After her PhD, Hogenhout moved to Ohio State University to be assistant and then associate professor and since 2007 has been Group Leader in plant health at the John Innes Centre in Norwich.

In 2013, she was appointed honorary professor at the University of East Anglia, and in 2018, she was made professor by special appointment at the University of Amsterdam.

Hogenhout's research investigates the interactions between insects and plants and how microorganisms can manipulate this.

Her group discovered the key virulence protein SAP54 which phytoplasma bacteria use to manipulate the flowering of plants, the bacteria is carried between plants by plant feeding insects such as leafhoppers.

Her work looks at other insects that transmit plant diseases such as the peach potato aphid Myzus persicae, this aphid can carry many different plant viruses and feeds on a wide range of plants and can manipulate plants to benefit the aphids by producing virulence proteins. Her group have sequenced the genome of the peach potato aphid and were surprised to find that it was smaller than the pea aphid Acyrthosiphon pisum, a species with many fewer host plants. Hogenhout found that the aphid can adapt the virulence proteins it produces in response to the plant species it is feeding on; and as it can reproduce asexually, producing a clone of genetically identical offspring, local populations of aphids can adapt quickly to their environment.

Hogenhout's research has also looked at the responses of plants to insect feeding, she showed that plants take in calcium to damaged plant cells in the site where aphid feeding stylets penetrate, the cells would then mobilise further calcium in response to this alarm.

Hogenhout is leading a major UK consortium project BRIGIT carrying out research into transmission of the bacterial pathogen Xylella fastidiosa, which has caused widespread plant disease in Southern Europe. The research will find out more information about the disease such as symptoms and epidemiology, and look into how the disease may be transmitted by insects such as leafhoppers and the transport of commercial plants by humans.

=== Awards and honours ===
Hogenhout was elected a Fellow of the Royal Entomological Society (FRES) and a Fellow of the Royal Society (FRS) in 2024.
