= List of fellows of the Royal Society elected in 1716 =

This is a list of fellows of the Royal Society elected in 1716.

== Fellows ==
- Claudius Amyand (d. 1740)
- Thomas Cartwright (1671–1748)
- Johann Adolph, Baron von Diescau (d. 1767)
- Joseph Hodges (c. 1704–1722)
- Marques de Monte Leone (fl. 1716–1718)
- Henry Nicholson (c. 1681–1733)
- Giovanni Giuseppe, Marquis Orsi (1652–1733)
- Robert Paul (c. 1697–1762)
- Antonio Maria Salvini (1653–1729?)
- William Simon (fl. 1716–1722)
- Otto Christoph Volckra, Count of Heidenreichstein (d. 1734)
- John Churchill Wickstead (d. 1774)
