= List of fellows of the Royal Society elected in 1859 =

Fellows of the Royal Society elected in 1859.

== Fellows ==
1. Samuel Husbands Beckles (1814–1890)
2. Frederick Crace Calvert (1819–1873)
3. Henry John Carter (1813–1895)
4. Douglas Strutt Galton (1822–1899)
5. William Bird Herapath (1820–1868)
6. George Murray Humphry (1820–1896)
7. Thomas Sterry Hunt (1826–1892)
8. John Denis Macdonald (1826–1908)
9. William Odling (1829–1921)
10. Robert Patterson (1802–1872)
11. John Penn (1805–1878)
12. Robert Hermann Schomburgk (1804–1865)
13. Edward Henry Stanley (1826–1893)
14. Archibald Campbell Tait (1811–1882)
15. Sir Thomas Watson (1792–1882)
16. Bennet Woodcroft (1803–1879)
17. William Yolland (1810–1885)
