= List of fellows of the Royal Society elected in 1788 =

Fellows of the Royal Society elected in 1788.

== Fellows ==
1. Richard Pepper Arden, 1st Baron Alvanley (1744–1804)
2. James Bowdoin (1726–1790)
3. George Boyle, 4th Earl of Glasgow (1765–1843)
4. Thomas Bugge (1740–1815), Danish astronomer
5. Eugenius Bulgaris (1716–1806)
6. Lorenz Florenz Friedrich von Crell (1744–1816)
7. John Crisp, Deputy Governor, Fort Marlborough
8. Robert Waring Darwin (1766–1848)
9. John Finlay (1760–1802), military engineer
10. Edward Gibbon (1737–1794), historian and author
11. George Hardinge (1743–1816)
12. Johann Hedwig (1730–1799), German botanist
13. Nicolas Joseph Jacquin (1727–1817), Dutch scientist
14. Robert Augustus Johnson (1745–1799)
15. Antoine Laurent Lavoisier (1743–1794)
16. Antonio Maria Lorgna (1730–1796), Italian mathematician
17. Theodore Augustine Mann (1735–1809)
18. William Pearce (1744–1820), Dean of Ely
19. Jean-Rodolphe Perronet (1708–1794), French architect
20. Reginald Pole-Carew (1753–1835)
21. Philip Rashleigh (1729–1811), mineralogist
22. Horace Benedict de Saussure (1740–1799), Swiss geologist
23. John Sibthorpe (1758–1796)
24. Richard Brooke Supple (1758–1829) (later Richard de Capell Brooke)
25. Carl Peter Thunberg (1743–1828), Swedish naturalist
26. Martin Wall (1747–1824)
27. Charles Wilkins (1749–1836)
