= List of fellows of the Royal Society elected in 1701 =

This is a list of fellows of the Royal Society elected in 1701.

== Fellows ==
- Cyril Arthington (c.1666–1720)
- James Drake (1667–1707)
- Christian Leyoncrona (c.1662–1710)
- Owen Lloyd (c.1674–1738)
- John Perceval, 1st Earl of Egmont (1683–1748)
- John Shadwell (1671–1747)
