= List of fellows of the Royal Society elected in 1811 =

Fellows of the Royal Society elected in 1811.

== Fellows ==
1. John Proctor Anderdon (c.1761–1846)
2. Frederick Francis Baker (1772–1830)
3. Robert Brown (1773–1858)
4. John Carstairs (d. 1837)
5. John Chaloner (1776–1842)
6. Sir William Congreve, 2nd Baronet (1772–1828)
7. Isaac Corry (1755–1813)
8. William Dealtry (1775–1847)
9. John Dent (1761–1826)
10. Richard Dixon (c.1780–1858)
11. Thomas Egan (1752–1818)
12. John Elliot (c.1764–1829)
13. Henry Ellis (1777–1869)
14. Henry Richard Vassall Fox, 3rd Baron Holland (1773–1840)
15. William Franks (1788–1860)
16. George Hibbert (1757–1837)
17. Thomas Hoblyn (1778–1860)
18. John Kaye (1783–1853)
19. Edward Hawke Locker (1777–1849)
20. James Macartney (1770–1843)
21. Henry Petty-Fitzmaurice, 3rd Marquess of Lansdowne (1780–1863)
22. John Randolph, Bishop of London (1749–1813)
23. George Rowley (1782–1836)
24. Thomas Sampson (d. 1839)
25. Walter Wade (d. 1825)
26. Charles Wentworth-Fitzwilliam, 5th Earl Fitzwilliam (1786–1857)
