= Pierre Friedlingstein =

Climate scientist

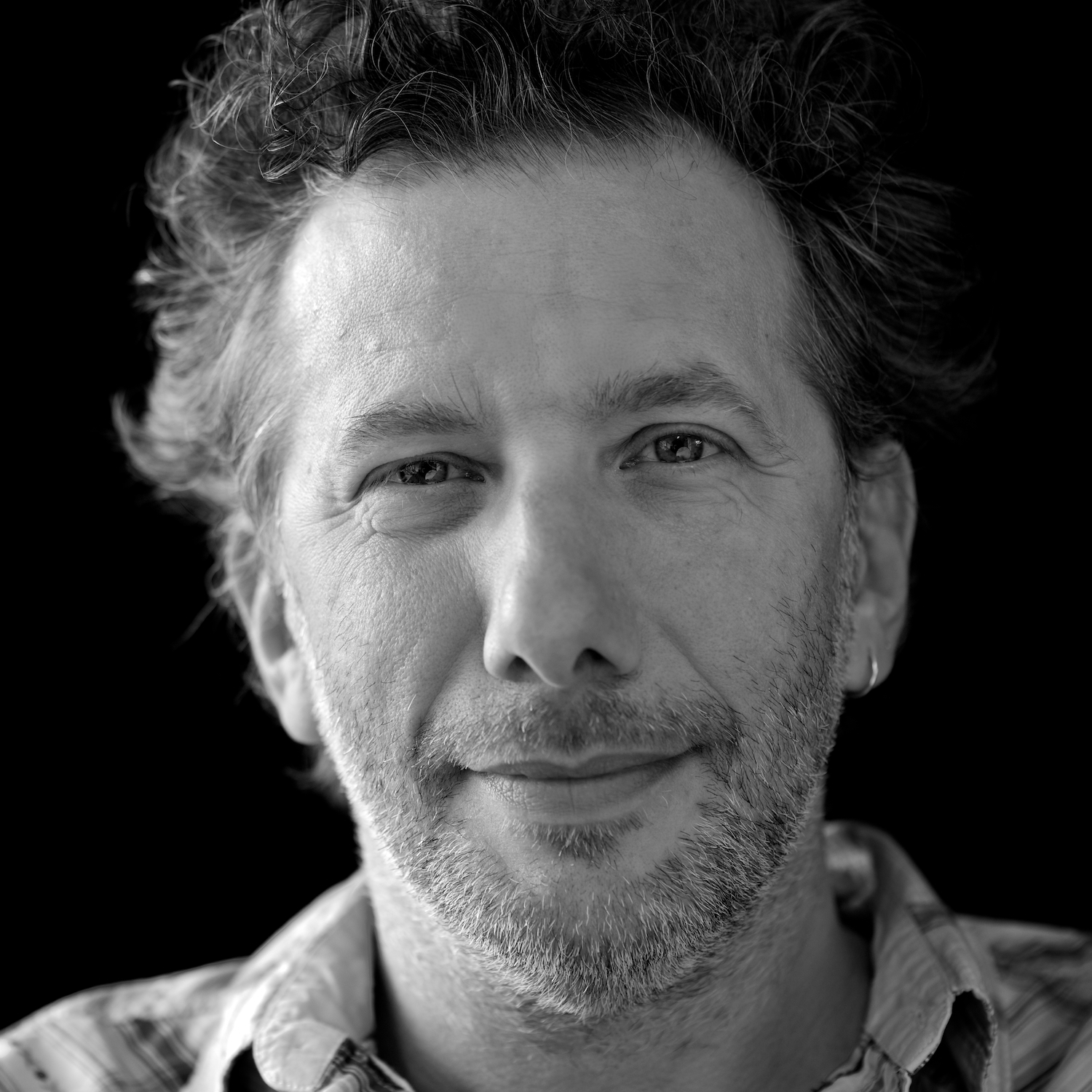
Pierre Friedlingstein

Pierre Friedlingstein FRS is Professor and Chair in Mathematical Modelling of the Climate System at the University of Exeter, and Research Director at the Laboratoire de Météorologie dynamique (LMD), Centre National de la Recherche Scientifique (CNRS), France.

He has 30 years research experience in the field of global carbon cycle modelling, global biogeochemical cycles and global climate change. He was awarded the Vladimir Ivanovich Vernadsky Medal of the European Geosciences Union (GSU) in 2020 and the Alexander von Humbold Research award in 2019. In 2022 he was elected a Fellow of the Royal Society.

Friedlingstein leads the annual Global Carbon Budget initiative, providing critical data for international climate policy assessments. He is also a member of the Joint Science Committee of the World Climate Research Programme.
