= List of fellows of the Royal Society elected in 1900 =

Fellows of the Royal Society elected in 1900.

== Fellows ==
1. George James Burch (1852–1914)
2. Tannatt William Edgeworth David (1858–1934)
3. John Bretland Farmer (1865–1944)
4. Leonard Erskine Hill (1858–1952)
5. John Horne (1848–1928)
6. Joseph Jackson Lister (1857–1927)
7. James Gordon MacGregor (1852–1913)
8. Sir Patrick Manson (1844–1922)
9. Thomas Muir (1844–1934)
10. Ford North (1830–1913)
11. Henry George Percy (1846–1918)
12. Arthur Alcock Rambaut (1859–1923)
13. William James Sell (1847–1915)
14. Walter Baldwin Spencer (1860–1929)
15. James Walker (1863–1935)
16. Philip Watts (1846–1926)
17. Charles Thomson Rees Wilson (1869–1959)
