= List of fellows of the Royal Society elected in 1930 =

This is a list of people elected Fellow of the Royal Society in 1930.

== Fellows ==
- Herbert Stanley Allen
- Sir Edward Battersby Bailey
- Frederick Tom Brooks
- Paul Adrien Maurice Dirac
- Harold Ward Dudley
- Charles Alfred Edwards
- Harry Eltringham
- Sir Charles Edward Inglis
- Sir Eric Keightley Rideal
- Robert Robison
- Sir Harold Spencer Jones
- John Stephenson
- Sir George Paget Thomson
- Charles Todd
- William Whiteman Carlton Topley

== Foreign members ==
- Gerard Jakob De Geer
- Tullio Levi-Civita

== Statute 12 fellows ==
- James Ramsay MacDonald
- Jan Christiaan Smuts
