= List of fellows of the Royal Society elected in 1720 =

This is a list of fellows of the Royal Society elected in 1720.

== Fellows ==
- Henry Beighton (d. 1743)
- Alexander Cuming (c. 1690–1775)
- Thomas Dereham (c. 1678–1739)
- Pierre des Maizeaux (?1672–1745)
- John Douglas (d. 1743)
- Henry Heathcote (d. 1727)
- Friedrich Hoffmann (1660–1742)
- Abel Ketelbey (c. 1676–1744)
- Richard Manningham (1690–1759)
- William Mathew (d. 1752)
- William North, 6th Baron North and 2nd Lord Grey (1678–1734)
- Jeffrey Palmer (?1700–1721)
- David Papillon (1691–1662)
- Zachary Pearce (1690–1774)
- Henry Pemberton (1694–1771)
- Giambattista Recanati (1687–1734)
- William Rutty (1687–?1730)
- Samuel Sanders (d. 1746)
- William Sherard (1659–1728)
- Oliver St John (c. 1691–1743)
- Charles Stuart (c. 1682–1770)
- John Warburton (1682–1759)
