= List of fellows of the Royal Society elected in 1869 =

Fellows of the Royal Society elected in 1869.

== Fellows ==
1. Samuel White Baker (1821–1893)
2. John Jeremiah Bigsby (1792–1881)
3. Charles Chambers (1834–1896)
4. William Esson (1838–1916)
5. George Carey Foster (1835–1919)
6. Robert Arthur Talbot Gascoyne-Cecil (1830–1903)
7. Sir William Withey Gull (1816–1890)
8. Joseph Norman Lockyer (1836–1920)
9. John Robinson McClean (1813–1873)
10. St. George Jackson Mivart (1827–1900)
11. Robert Cornelis Napier (1810–1890)
12. John Russell Reynolds (1828–1896)
13. Robert Spencer Robinson (1809–1889)
14. James Francis Tennant (1829–1915)
15. Wyville Thomas Charles Thomson (1830–1882)
16. Henry Edward Landor Thuillier (1813–1906)
17. Edward Walker (1820–1893)

== Foreign members ==
1. Alphonse Louis Pierre Pyramus de Candolle (1806–1893)
2. Charles-Eugène Delaunay (1816–1872)
3. Louis Pasteur (1822–1895)
