= List of fellows of the Royal Society elected in 1894 =

Fellows of the Royal Society elected in 1894.

== Fellows ==
1. William Bateson (1861–1926)
2. George Albert Boulenger (1858–1937)
3. John Rose Bradford (1863–1935)
4. Hugh Longbourne Callendar (1863–1930)
5. William Watson Cheyne (1852–1932)
6. Robert Edmund Froude (1846–1924)
7. Micaiah John Muller Hill (1856–1929)
8. John Viriamu Jones (1856–1901)
9. Augustus Edward Hough Love (1863–1940)
10. Richard Lydekker (1849–1915)
11. Francis Cranmer Penrose (1817–1903)
12. Dukinfield Henry Scott (1854–1934)
13. Frederick John Smith (1848–1911)
14. Joseph Wilson Swan (1828–1914)
15. Victor Herbert Veley (1856–1933)

== Foreign members ==
1. Henri Ernest Baillon (1827–1895)
2. Jules Henri Poincare (1854–1912)
3. Eduard Suess (1831–1914)
