= List of fellows of the Royal Society elected in 1802 =

Fellows of the Royal Society elected in 1802.

== Fellows of the Royal Society ==
1. George Biggin (c.1762–1803)
2. Jacques Louis, Count of Bournon (1751–1825)
3. Charles Burney (1757–1817)
4. Astley Paston Cooper (1768–1841)
5. William Cruickshank
6. Alexander Hamilton Douglas, 10th Duke of Hamilton (1767–1852)
7. Gilbert Elliot, 1st Earl of Minto (1751–1814)
8. Richard Fowler (1765–1863)
9. Edward Hilliard (d. 1816)
10. Edward Knatchbull (1781–1849)
11. George Knox (1765–1827)
12. John Liptrap
13. King of Bavaria, Maximilian I (1756–1825) (Royal Member)
14. Langford Millington (d. 1807)
15. David William Murray, 3rd Earl of Mansfield (1777–1840)
16. Lord Webb John Seymour (1777–1819)
17. Henry Robert Stewart, 2nd Marquess of Londonderry (1769–1822)
18. John Trotter (c.1766–1819)
19. Dawson Turner (1775–1858)
20. James Ware (1756–1815)
21. Robert Woodhouse (1773–1827)
