= List of fellows of the Royal Society elected in 1896 =

Fellows of the Royal Society elected in 1896.

== Fellows ==
1. George Sydenham Clarke (1848–1933)
2. John Norman Collie (1859–1942)
3. Arthur Matthew Weld Downing (1850–1917)
4. Francis Elgar (1845–1909)
5. John Eldon Gorst (1835–1916)
6. Andrew Gray (1847–1925)
7. George Jennings Hinde (1839–1918)
8. Henry Alexander Miers (1858–1942)
9. Sir Frederick Walker Mott (1853–1926)
10. John Murray (1841–1914)
11. Karl Pearson (1857–1936)
12. Thomas Roscoe Rede Stebbing (1835–1926)
13. Charles Stewart (1840–1907)
14. Sir Richard Temple (1826–1902)
15. William Edward Wilson (1851–1908)
16. Horace Bolingbroke Woodward (1848–1914)
17. William Palmer Wynne (1861–1950)

== Foreign members ==
1. Albert Heim (1849–1937)
2. Gabriel Jonas Lippmann (1845–1921)
3. Gösta Mittag-Leffler (1846–1927)
4. Giovanni Virginio Schiaparelli (1835–1910)
