= List of fellows of the Royal Society elected in 1666 =

This is a list of fellows of the Royal Society elected in its seventh year, 1666.

== Fellows ==
- Adrian Auzout (1622–1691)
- Robert Bertie (1630–1701)
- George Cock (d. 1679)
- John Copplestone (1623–1689)
- Sir Thomas Crisp (d. 1715)
- William Harrington (d. 1671)
- John Hay (1645–1713)
- Henry Howard (1628–1684)
- Sir Edmond King (1629–1709)
- Benjamin Laney (1591–1675)
- Nicholas Mercator (1620–1687)
- George Morley (1597–1684)
- David Murray (d. 1668)
- Edward Nelthorpe (1604–1685)
- Samuel Parker (1640–1688)
- John Robartes (1606–1685)
- Sir Paul Rycaut (1628–1700)
