= List of fellows of the Royal Society elected in 1703 =

This is a list of fellows of the Royal Society elected in 1703.

== Fellows ==
- Robert Areskin (c. 1674–1719)
- Peniston Booth (1681–1785)
- Claude Bourdelin (1667–1711)
- Johann Philipp Breyne (c. 1680–1764)
- William Derham (1657–1735)
- Sir Matthew Dudley, 2nd Baronet (1661–1721)
- John Hickes (fl. 1703–1717)
- James Hodgson (1672–1755)
- Pieter Hotton (1648–1709)
- Richard Mead (1673–1754)
- Joseph Morland (c. 1671–1716)
- John Morton (c. 1670–1726)
- William Oliver (1659–1716)
- August Quirinus Rivinus (1652–1723)
- Russell Robartes (c. 1672–1724)
- Johann Jakob Scheuchzer (1672–1733)
- Joseph Shaw (1671–1733)
- Philip Stubs (1665–1738)
- Emanuele Timone (1665–1741)
- Antonio Valisnieri (1661–1730)
