= List of fellows of the Royal Society elected in 1668 =

This is a list of fellows of the Royal Society elected in its ninth year, 1668.

== Fellows ==
- Thomas Allen (d. 1684)
- Arthur Annesley (1614–1686)
- James Arderne (1636–1691)
- Sir John Banks (1627–1699)
- Edward Brown (1644–1708)
- Edward Chamberlayne (1616–1703)
- Thomas Colepeper (1637–1708)
- John Colwall (1664–1679)
- Edward Conway (1623–1683)
- Peter Courthope (1655–1685)
- Antonio Alvares da Cunha (1626–1690)
- Sir Maurice Eustace (d. 1703)
- Daniel Finch (1647–1730)
- Thomas Flatman (1637–1688)
- (unknown) Flower (b. 1668)
- James Gregorie (1638–1675)
- Erasmus Harby (1628–1674)
- Charles Hotham (1615–1674)
- Edward Howard (1668–1706)
- William Le Hunt (1668–1682)
- John Locke (1632–1704)
- Sir Kingsmill Lucy (1649–1678)
- Esay Ward (1629–1674)
- William Wentworth (1626–1695)
- Benjamin Woodroffe (1638–1711)
