= List of fellows of the Royal Society elected in 1662 =

This is a complete list of fellows of the Royal Society elected in its third year, 1662.

== Fellows ==
- Isaac Barrow (1630–1677)
- Sir John Brookes (1636–1691)
- Ralph Cudworth (1617–1688)
- John Graunt (1620–1674)
- George Lane (1621–1683)
- William Schroter (1640–1689)
- Robert Spencer (1640–1702)
- Henry de Vic (c. 1599–1671)
