= List of fellows of the Royal Society elected in 1689 =

This is a list of fellows of the Royal Society elected in 1689.

== Fellows ==
- Joseph Raphson (d. 1716)
- Nicolaus Witsen (1641–1717)
- George Moult (d. 1727)
- William Stanley (1647–1731)
