= List of fellows of the Royal Society elected in 1688 =

This is a list of fellows of the Royal Society elected in 1688.

== Fellows ==
- Joannes Nicolaus Pechlin (1646–1706)
- Edward Stillingfleet (1660–1708)
- Raymond Vieussens (1635–1715)
- John Adair (1647–1718)
- Sir Charles Gresham (1660–1718)
- John Clayton (1657–1725)
- Joannes Adamus Stampfer (d. 1743)
- Nicolas Fatio de Duillier (1664–1753)
