= List of fellows of the Royal Society elected in 1881 =

Fellows of the Royal Society elected in 1881.

== Fellows ==
1. William Edward Ayrton (1847–1908)
2. Henry Walter Bates (1825–1892)
3. John Syer Bristowe (1827–1895)
4. Sir William Henry Mahoney Christie (1845–1922)
5. George Dickie (1812–1882)
6. William Ewart Gladstone (1809–1898)
7. Mountstuart Elphinstone Grant Duff (1829–1906)
8. William George Granville Venables Vernon Harcourt (1827–1904)
9. Alfred Bray Kempe (1849–1922)
10. Alexander Macalister (1844–1919)
11. Herbert McLeod (1841–1923)
12. John Arthur Phillips (1822–1887)
13. William Henry Preece (1834–1913)
14. Bernhard Samuelson (1820–1905)
15. Bindon Blood Stoney (1828–1909)
16. Ramsey Heatley Traquair (1840–1912)
17. Henry William Watson (1827–1903)
18. Charles Romley Alder Wright (1844–1894)

== Foreign members ==
1. Gabriel Auguste Daubrée (1814–1896)
2. Jean Charles Galissard de Marignac (1817–1894)
3. Carl Wilhelm von Nägeli (1817–1891)
4. Carl Wilhelm Weierstrass (1815–1897)
