= List of fellows of the Royal Society elected in 1815 =

Fellows of the Royal Society elected in 1815.

== Fellows ==
1. Thomas Allan (1777–1833)
2. Henry Benjamin Hanbury Beaufoy (1786–1851)
3. Barrington Pope Blachford (d. 1816)
4. Peter Patten Bold (d. 1819)
5. Phineas Bond (1748–1815)
6. David Brewster (1781–1868)
7. Thomas William Carr (d. 1829)
8. James Cocks (b. 1774)
9. James Dawkins (b. 1760)
10. William Francis Eliott (1792–1864)
11. William Henry Fitton (1780–1861)
12. Thomas Grey (d. 1846)
13. John Haighton (1755–1823)
14. William Harrison
15. George Harry Fleetwood Hartopp (1785–1824)
16. Christopher Hawkins (1758–1829)
17. Henry Holland (1788–1873)
18. James Ivory (1765–1842)
19. William Martin Leake (1777–1860)
20. Charles Mackenzie (1788–1862)
21. George Steuart Mackenzie (1780–1848)
22. George D'Oyly (1778–1846)
23. Thomas Lister Parker (1779–1858)
24. Roger Pettiward (1754–1833)
25. John Delafield Phelps (1765–1843)
26. John Rickman (1771–1840)
27. Peter Mark Roget (1779–1869)
28. Benjamin Travers (1783–1858)
29. Samuel Turner
30. John William Ward (1781–1833)
31. George Warrender (1782–1849)
32. John Whishaw (1765–1840)

== Foreign members ==
1. Jean-Baptiste Biot (1774–1862) ForMemRS
2. Joseph Louis Gay-Lussac (1778–1850) ForMemRS
3. Alexander von Humboldt (1769–1859) ForMemRS
