= List of fellows of the Royal Society elected in 1725 =

This is a list of fellows of the Royal Society elected in 1725.

== Fellows ==
- Silvanus Bevan (1691–1765), apothecary and physician
- Moritz Anton Cappeller (1685–1769), Swiss physician and mathematician
- Andreas Henry de Cronhelm (fl 1725–1753), German
- Charles de la Faye (1677–1762), Clerk of the Signet
- Antonio Galvao (fl 1725–1730), Portuguese ambassador to London
- Nathan Hickman (c.1695–1746)
- Thomas Hill (c.1683–1758), poet
- Robert Houston (c.1678–1734), physician
- Thomas Hunt (died 1731?), Captain, 1st Dragoon Guards
- Robert Nesbitt (c.1697–1761), physician
- Casper Neumann (1683–1737), German chemist
- Richard Poley (died 1770), Secretary to the British Envoy in Sweden
- Thomas Roby (1689–1729)
- Edmund Stone (1700–1768), mathematician
- George Lewis Teissier (died 1742), German physician
- James Theobald (died 1759), merchant
- Taylor White (1701–1772), barrister and collector
