= List of fellows of the Royal Society elected in 1732 =

Fellows of the Royal Society elected in 1732.

== Fellows ==
1. Vincent Bacon (died 1739), surgeon
2. Robert Barker (died 1745), physician
3. Sir Edward Barry, 1st Baronet (1696–1776), Irish physician
4. Jean Baptiste Bassand (1680–1742), French physician
5. John Belchier (1706–1785), surgeon
6. William Clavering-Cowper, 2nd Earl Cowper (1709–1764), courtier
7. Thomas Lee Dummer (c.1712–1765), MP
8. Sir James Edwards, 2nd Baronet (c.1689–1744)
9. Rose Fuller (1708–1777), landowner and MP
10. Jean Patrice Piers de Girardin
11. John Gray (died 1769), Naval mathematician and engineer
12. Fayrer Hall (died c.1756)
13. John Lindsay, 20th Earl of Crawford (1702–1749)
14. Conde de Montijo (1693-1763)
15. Louis Jouard de La Nauze (1696–1773), French
16. Baron Pfutschner (died 1752)
17. John Robartes, 4th Earl of Radnor (c.1686–1757)
18. Jacob Serenius (1700–1776), Swedish cleric
19. James Lyon Strathmore (1702–1735) Scottish peer
20. Johann Friedrich Weidler (1691–1755), Mathematician
