= List of fellows of the Royal Society elected in 1922 =

Fellows of the Royal Society elected in 1922 are listed here.

== Fellows ==
- Thomas Hastie Bryce
- Sir Charles Galton Darwin
- Stewart Ranken Douglas
- Claude Gordon Douglas
- Alfred James Ewart
- Arthur Hutchinson
- Frederick William Lanchester
- James Mercer
- Samuel Roslington Milner
- Marcus Seymour Pembrey
- Frank Lee Pyman
- George Adolphus Schott
- Nevil Vincent Sidgwick
- David Meredith Seares Watson
- Sir Alfred Fernandez Yarrow
