= List of fellows of the Royal Society elected in 1795 =

Fellows of the Royal Society elected in 1795.

== Fellows ==
1. William Blane (1750–1835)
2. Sylvester Douglas, Baron Glenbervie (1743–1823)
3. Gregorio Fontana (1735–1803)
4. Alberto Fortis (1741–1803)
5. Hugh Gillan (d. 1798)
6. Archibald Harrison
7. George Heath (1745–1822), Headmaster of Eton School
8. George Howard, 6th Earl of Carlisle (1773–1848)
9. Benjamin Hutchinson (d. 1804)
10. Martin Heinrich Klaproth (1743–1817)
11. Thomas James Mathias (c.1754–1835)
12. Matthew Montagu
13. Barnaba Oriani (1752–1832)
14. John Parker, 1st Earl of Morley (1772–1840)
15. Christopher Pegge (1765–1822)
16. William Petrie (1784–1816)
17. Jacob Pleydell-Bouverie, 2nd Earl of Radnor (1750–1828)
18. David Rittenhouse (1732–1796)
19. Abraham Robertson (1751–1826)
20. Johann Christian Daniel von Schreber (1739–1810)
21. Matthew Smith (1739–1812), Captain of Tower of London
22. August Ferdinand Veltheim (1741–1801)
23. Samuel Young (1766–1826)
