= List of fellows of the Royal Society elected in 1680 =

This is a list of fellows of the Royal Society elected in 1680.

== Fellows ==
- Peter Perkins (d. 1680)
- Jonas Moore (d. 1682)
- Jacobus Pighius (1647–1682)
- John Wood (d. 1682)
- Johann Christian Heusch (1680–1684)
- Andrew Clench (d. 1692)
- Thomas Firmin (1632–1697)
- John Houghton (1645–1705)
- Denis Papin (1647–1712)
- Robert Nelson (1656–1715)
- Antoni van Leeuwenhoek (1632–1723)
- Frederick Slare (1647–1727)
