= List of fellows of the Royal Society elected in 1677 =

This is a list of fellows of the Royal Society elected in its 18th year, 1677.

== Fellows ==
- George Ent (1644–1679)
- Sir George Croke (d. 1680)
- Christopher Adolphus Baldwin (1632–1682)
- Sir Peter Colleton (1635–1694)
- Robert Plot (1640–1696)
- Thomas Gale (1636–1702)
- Thomas Smith (1638–1710)
- John Flamsteed (1646–1719)
- Sir George Wheler (1650–1723)
- Oliver Hill (b. 1630)
- John Herbert (b. 1647)
- Edmund Wyndham (b. 1659)
