= List of fellows of the Royal Society elected in 1800 =

Fellows of the Royal Society elected in 1800.

== Fellows ==
1. Arthur Annesley (1744–1816)
2. Codrington Edmund Carrington (1769–1849)
3. Henry Cecil (1754–1804)
4. Alexander Crichton (1763–1856)
5. Charles Dickinson (1755–1827)
6. William Douglas (1768–1819)
7. Morton Eden (1752–1830)
8. Sir John Cox Hippisley (c. 1747–1825)
9. Thomas Tyrwhitt Jones (1765–1811)
10. Gibbes Walker Jordan (1757–1823)
11. John Macdonald (1759–1831)
12. William George Maton (1774–1835)
13. James Meyrick (1748–1818)
14. Caleb Hillier Parry (1755–1822)
15. Thomas Pelham (1756–1826)
16. Sir Charles Morice Pole (1757–1830)
17. John Corse Scott (c. 1762–1840)
18. Robert Smith (1752–1838)
19. Michael Symes (c. 1761–1809)
