= List of fellows of the Royal Society elected in 1727 =

This is a list of fellows of the Royal Society elected in 1727.

== Fellows ==
- Mohammed Ben Ali Abgali, ambassador from the Emperor of Morocco
- Edmond Allen (died 1763)
- Joseph Andrews (c.1691–1753), Paymaster to the Forces.
- William Carr (died 1742), MP and Mayor of Newcastle
- Walter Cary (1685–1757), MP and public administrator
- Charles Cavendish (1704–1783), MP
- Francis Clifton (died 1736), physician
- Nicola Cyrillo (1671–1735), physician
- Henry Colepeper Fairfax (c.1697–1734), mathematician
- William Folkes (c.1700–1773), Registrar of the Alienation Office
- John Fuller (1706–1755), MP for Boroughbridge
- Edward Harley, 2nd Earl of Oxford and Mortimer (1689–1741)
- John Harper (died 1735), barrister
- Benjamin Hoadly (1706–1757), physician
- John Hollings (1683?–1739), physician
- Edward Hughes, MP for Saltash
- Theodore Jacobsen (died 1772), architect and merchant
- Bernard de Jussieu (1699–1777), French naturalist
- Charles Lamotte (died 1742), clergyman
- Philemon Lloyd, Secretary to the Province of Maryland
- Anton Adam Mansberg, German
- John Martyn (1699–1768), apothecary and botanist
- Sir Erasmus Philipps, 5th Baronet (1699–1743), MP for Haverfordwest
- Thomas Pocock (1672–1745), clergyman
- Sir Robert Pye, 4th Baronet (c.1696–1734), clergyman
- Benjamin Robins (1707–1751), engineer and mathematician
- Thomas Trevor, 2nd Baron Trevor of Bromham (1692–1753)
- James West (1703–1772), barrister and antiquary
- Philip Henry Zollman, publisher

== Royal fellows ==
- George II of Great Britain (1683–1760)
