= List of fellows of the Royal Society elected in 1722 =

This is a list of fellows of the Royal Society elected in 1722.

== Fellows ==
- Thomas Bacon (?1664–1736)
- Charles Beauclerk, 1st Duke of St Albans (1670–1726)
- Philip Julius Borneman (fl.1722–1726)
- Richard Boyle, 3rd Earl of Burlington and 4th Earl of Cork (1695–1753)
- Ambrose Dickens (c. 1687–1747)
- Charles Douglas, 3rd Duke of Queensberry (1698–1778)
- Samuel Harris (1682–1733)
- Robert Hucks (d. 1745)
- Richard Lucas (c. 1693–?1747)
- Thomas Miles (d. 1767)
- Richard Molesworth, 3rd Viscount Molesworth (1680–1758)
- Giambattista Morgagni (1682–1771)
- Samuel Morland (d. 1734)
- William Musgrave (c. 1696–1724)
- George Parker, 2nd Earl of Macclesfield (c. 1697–1764)
- William Paston, 2nd Earl of Yarmouth (1652–1732)
- William Sloane (1696–1767)
- Charles Taylor (c. 1693–1766)
- Abraham Vater (1684–1751)
- Talbot Yelverton, Earl of Sussex (1690–1731)
