= List of fellows of the Royal Society elected in 1673 =

This is a list of fellows of the Royal Society elected in its 14th year, 1673.

== Fellows ==
- John Le Gassick (d. 1674)
- Giles Strangways (1615–1675)
- Rowland Winn (1609–1676)
- Sir Richard Ford (1613–1678)
- Sir Thomas Player (d. 1686)
- Andrew Birch (1652–1691)
- Sir John Lawrence (d. 1692)
- Edward Bernard (1638–1697)
- Charles Somerset Marquess of Worcester (1660–1698)
- John Stafford Howard (d. 1714)
- Gottfried Wilhelm von Leibniz (1646–1716)
- Francis Robartes (1650–1718)
