= List of fellows of the Royal Society elected in 1916 =

This is a list of people elected Fellow of the Royal Society in 1916.

== Fellows ==
- Edwin Henry Barton
- William Robert Bousfield
- Sidney George Brown
- Ernest George Coker
- George Gerald Henderson
- John Edensor Littlewood
- John Alexander MacWilliam
- Joseph Henry Maiden
- Alexander McKenzie
- Henry Harold Welch Pearson
- James Arthur Pollock
- Sir Leonard Rogers
- Cresswell Shearer
- Sir D'Arcy Wentworth Thompson
- Henry Woods

== Foreign members ==
- Jules Jean Baptiste Vincent Bordet
- Boris Borisovich Golitsyn
- Johan Hjort
- Charles Louis Alphonse Laveran
- Heike Kamerlingh Onnes
