= List of fellows of the Royal Society elected in 1789 =

This is a list of fellows of the Royal Society elected in 1789.

== Fellows ==
1. James Adair (c.1743–1798), Irish Sergeant-at-Law
2. Abraham Bennet (1749–1799), clergyman and physicist
3. Claude Louis, Count Berthollet (1748–1822), French chemist
4. Johann Elert Bode (1747–1826), German astronomer
5. Jean Dominique Cassini, Count of Thury (1748–1845), French astronomer
6. Jonathan Davies (1736–1809), Eton headmaster
7. Sampson Eardley, Baron Eardley (died 1824)
8. Richard Fitzwilliam, 7th Viscount Fitzwilliam of Meryon (1745–1816)
9. Frederick Augustus, Duke of York and Albany (1763–1827), Royal Member
10. Adrien Marie Le Gendre (1752–1833), French mathematician
11. John Gillies (1747–1836), historian
12. Samuel Goodenough, Bishop of Carlisle (1743–1827)
13. Henry Frederick William, Duke of Cumberland and Strathearn (1745–1790), Royal Member
14. Ewald Friedrich Herzberg (1725–1795), Prussian statesman
15. Christian Gottlob Heyne (1729–1812), German archaeologist
16. Edward Jenner (1749–1823), physician
17. Abraham Gotthelf Kastner (1719–1800), German mathematician
18. Pierre Simon Laplace (1749–1827), French scholar
19. Pierre François Andre Méchain (1744–1805), French astronomer
20. John David Michaelis (1717–1791), Prussian scholar
21. Robert Morse (1743–1818), military engineer
22. George Rogers (died 1816), Navy commissioner
23. George Shaw (1751–1813), botanist and zoologist
24. Johann Karl Wilcke (1732–1796), Swedish physicist
25. Robert Wood, MP
