= List of fellows of the Royal Society elected in 1694 =

This is a list of fellows of the Royal Society elected in 1694.

== Fellows ==
- Patrick Gordon (d. 1702)
- John Jackson (1672–1724)
- James Brydges 1st Duke of Chandos (1674–1744)
