= List of fellows of the Royal Society elected in 1709 =

This is a list of fellows of the Royal Society elected in 1709.

== Fellows ==
- Henry Cressener (1683–1710)
- Guido Grandi (1671–1742)
- Robert Hunter (1666–1734)
- Johann Friedrich Leopold (1676–1711)
- Lorenzo Magalotti (1637–1712)
- Henry Newton (1651–1715)
- Samuel Tufnell (1682–1758)
