= List of fellows of the Royal Society elected in 1681 =

This is a list of fellows of the Royal Society elected in 1681.

== Fellows ==
- Robert Wood (1621–1685)
- Sir John Percivale (1660–1686)
- Henry Eve (d. 1686)
- Thomas Novell (d. 1686)
- Oliver Salusbury (1673–1687)
- Isaac Dorislaus (d. 1688)
- Henry Justel (1620–1693)
- Francis Lodwik (1619–1694)
- Sir Patience Ward (1629–1696)
- William Payne (1650–1696)
- Gregorio Leti (1630–1701)
- Roger Meredith (1637–1701)
- Sir Jeremy Sambrooke (d. 1705)
- Jodocus Crull (d. 1713)
- Richard Waller (1646–1715)
- John Rogers (1647–1715)
- John Philip Jordis (1681–1715)
- William Penn (1644–1718)
- Hugh Chamberlen (1630–1720)
- Sir Anthony Deane (1633–1721)
- Laurence Braddon (d. 1724)
- Sir Rowland Gwynne (1658–1726)
- Richard Robinson (d. 1733)
- Samuel Blackburne (b. 1681)
- (unknown) Goodwyn (b. 1681)
