= List of fellows of the Royal Society elected in 1683 =

This is a list of fellows of the Royal Society elected in 1683.

== Fellows ==
- William Gould (1652–1686)
- Allen Moulin (1653–1690)
- Charles Willughby (d. 1694)
- Edward Haynes (1683–1708)
- Arthur Bailey (d. 1712)
- Edward Wetenhall (1636–1713)
- Nathaniel Vincent (d. 1722)
