= John Topham =

John Topham (1746–1803) was an English official, librarian and antiquary.

== Life ==
Born on 6 January 1746 at Emley near Huddersfield, he was the third son of Matthew Topham (died 1773), vicar of Withernwick and Mappleton in Yorkshire, and of his wife Ann, daughter of Henry Willcock of Thornton in Craven. John Topham went to London while still young with a minor appointment under Philip Carteret Webb, solicitor to the Treasury. By influence he obtained a place in the State Paper office with Sir Joseph Ayloffe and Thomas Astle.

On 5 February 1771 Topham was admitted to Lincoln's Inn, and on 5 April 1779 he was elected a Fellow of the Royal Society. In May 1781 he was appointed a deputy-keeper of the state papers, and in April 1783 a commissioner in bankruptcy. On 19 March 1787 he became a bencher of Gray's Inn, and on 29 Nov. was elected treasurer of the Society of Antiquaries of London, to which he had been admitted a Fellow in 1767. About 1790 he became librarian to the Archbishop of Canterbury, in succession to Michael Lort. He also filled the offices of registrar to the charity for the relief of poor widows and children of clergymen (now known as the Corporation of the Sons and Friends of the Clergy) and of treasurer to the orphan charity school.

Topham died without issue at Cheltenham on 19 August 1803, and was buried in Gloucester Cathedral, where a marble monument was erected to him in the nave. On 20 August 1794 he has married Mary, daughter and coheiress of Mr. Swinden of Greenwich, Kent. Her account book dated 1810-25 was identified in the collection of Chawton House in 2015.

== Works ==
Topham wrote for Archæologia, and worked among the state papers. With Philip Morant, Richard Blyke, and Thomas Astle he collected and arranged the Rotuli Parliamentorum from 1278 to 1503, published for the Record Commission, to which he was secretary, in six volumes between 1767 and 1777. In 1775 he edited Francis Gregor's translation of Sir John Fortescue's De Laudibus Legum Angliæ and (with Richard Blyke) Sir John Glanvill's Reports of certain Cases … determined … in Parliament in the twenty-first and twenty-second years of James I, to which he prefixed "an historical account of the ancient right of determining cases upon controverted elections". In 1781 the Society of Antiquaries published a tract by him, A Description of an Antient Picture in Windsor Castle representing the Embarkation of King Henry VIII at Dover, May 31, 1520 (London), and in 1787 he contributed Observations on the Wardrobe Accounts of the twenty-eighth year of King Edward I [1299–1300] to the Liber Quotidianus Contrarotulatoris Garderobæ published by the Society under his direction.

Topham's library was sold in 1804, and several of his manuscripts were purchased by the British Museum. Ihese included the Topham charters, in 56 volumes, relating to lands granted to religious houses in England.
