= List of fellows of the Royal Society elected in 1698 =

This is a list of fellows of the Royal Society elected in 1698.

== Fellows ==
- Balthasar Becker (1634–1698)
- Sir Orlando Bridgeman (1649–1701)
- Giorgio Baglivi (1668–1707)
- Edward Haistwell (1658–1709)
- Domenico Guglielmini (1655–1710)
- John Somers Baron Somers of Evesham (1650–1716)
- Maurice Emmet (1676–1720)
- Matthew Prior (1664–1721)
- Charles Spencer 3rd Earl of Sunderland (1674–1722)
- Robert Molesworth 1st Viscount Molesworth and Baron Molesworth (1656–1725)
- Edward Norris (1663–1726)
- James Ogilvy 1st Earl of Seafield and 4th Earl of Findlater (1663–1730)
- Etienne Francois Geoffroy (1672–1731)
- Thomas Isted (1677–1731)
- John Fryer (1650–1733)
- Anthony Hammond (1668–1739)
- Sir John Stanley (1663–1744)
- George Mackay 3rd Lord Reay (1678–1748)
- Jacques Cassini (1677–1756)
- Sir Berkeley Lucy (1672–1759)
