= List of fellows of the Royal Society elected in 1695 =

This is a list of fellows of the Royal Society elected in 1695.

== Fellows ==
- Bernard Connor (1666–1698)
- Samuel Doody (1656–1706)
- Charles Montagu 1st Earl of Halifax (1661–1715)
- James Petiver (1663–1718)
- Domenico Bottoni (1641–1721)
- Moise Pujolas (d. 1729)
- Tommaso Del Bene (1652–1739)
- Richard Bentley (1662–1742)
