= List of fellows of the Royal Society elected in 1794 =

Fellows of the Royal Society elected in 1794.

== Fellows ==
1. John Blackburne (1754–1833)
2. Alexander Dirom (1757–1830)
3. James Earle (1755–1817)
4. Bryan Edwards (1743–1800)
5. John Freeman-Mitford, 1st Baron Redesdale (1748–1830)
6. Robert Fulke Greville (1751–1824)
7. John Grieve
8. John Hely-Hutchinson (1724–1794)
9. John Henslow
10. Nathaniel Hulme (1732–1807)
11. Robert Banks Jenkinson, 2nd Earl of Liverpool (1770–1828)
12. Thomas Keate (1745–1821)
13. Francis Humberston Mackenzie, 1st Baron Seaforth (1754–1815)
14. Lewis Majendie (d. 1838)
15. Matthew Martin (1748–1838)
16. Frederick North, 5th Earl of Guilford (1766–1827)
17. Peter Peirson (1739–1808)
18. Thomas Plumer (1753–1824)
19. Patrick Ross (c.1740–1804)
20. Johann Gottfried Schmeisser (1767–1837)
21. William Sotheby (1757–1833)
22. John Symmons (d. 1832)
23. John Walker (d. 1824)
24. Johann Gottlieb Walter (1734–1818)
25. Thomas Watkins (c.1761–1829)
26. William Wynne (d. 1815)
27. Thomas Young (1773–1829)
