= List of fellows of the Royal Society elected in 1706 =

This is a list of fellows of the Royal Society elected in 1706.

== Fellows ==
- Philip Bisse (1677–1721)
- Charles Boyle, 4th Earl of Orrery (1674–1731)
- William Burnett (1688–1729)
- Willem Buys (1661–1749)
- Carron, Count of Briancon (d. 1709)
- William Cowper, 1st Earl Cowper (c. 1665–1723)
- James Douglas (1675–1742)
- Jean Christophe Fatio (d. 1720)
- Thomas Forster (fl. 1706–1727)
- Gallucci (fl. 1706)
- Samuel Garth (1661–1719)
- John Knight (c. 1687–1733)
- Giovanni Maria Lancisi (1654–1720)
- Francis Nicholson (1660–1728)
- Thomas Savery (c. 1650–1715)
- James Sherard (1666–1738)
- Robert Shippen (1675–1745)
- Charles Townshend, 2nd Viscount Townshend (1675–1738)
- Wilhelm Van Vrijberge (1656–1711)
- Humfrey Wanley (1672–1726)
