= List of fellows of the Royal Society elected in 1700 =

This is a list of fellows of the Royal Society elected in 1700.

== Fellows ==
- Otto Sperling (1634–1715)
- Abraham Cyprianus (1660–1718)
- John Keill (1671–1721)
- Philip Sydenham (1676–1739)
- Charles Du Bois (1656–1740)
