= List of fellows of the Royal Society elected in 1801 =

Fellows of the Royal Society elected in 1801.

== Fellows ==
1. Edmund Antrobus
2. Edward Ash (c.1764–1829)
3. Edward Balme (d. 1823)
4. William Bligh (1754–1817)
5. Richard Chenevix (c.1774–1830)
6. Martin Davy (1763–1839)
7. John Ellis
8. Edward Forster (1769–1828)
9. James Willoughby Gordon (1773–1851)
10. John Hailstone (1759–1847)
11. Warren Hastings (1732–1818)
12. George Isted (d. 1821)
13. John Latham (1761–1843)
14. William Long (1747–1818)
15. Herbert Marsh, Bishop of Peterborough (1757–1839)
16. Robert Nixon (1759–1837)
17. Roger Elliot Roberts (c.1753–1831)
18. Matthew Smith
19. Walter Stirling (1758–1832)
20. Samuel Turner (1759–1802)
21. John Lloyd Williams
22. Giffin Wilson (1766–1848)
23. Robert Wissett (d. 1820)
24. Charles Philip Yorke (1764–1834)
