= List of fellows of the Royal Society elected in 1923 =

This is a list of people elected Fellow of the Royal Society in 1923.

== Fellows ==
- Edgar Douglas Adrian, 1st Baron Adrian of Cambridge
- William Lawrence Balls
- Archibald Barr
- Cecil Henry Desch
- Edward Fawcett
- Frank Horton
- Robert Thomson Leiper
- John James Rickard Macleod
- Sir Guy Anstruther Knox Marshall
- Sir Douglas Mawson
- James William McBain
- William Hobson Mills
- John Stanley Plaskett
- Henry Richardson Procter
- William Wilson
