= List of fellows of the Royal Society elected in 1670 =

This is a list of fellows of the Royal Society elected in its 11th year, 1670.

== Fellows ==
- Gustavus Helmfeld (1651–1674)
- Andre Monceaux (b. 1670)
