= List of fellows of the Royal Society elected in 1792 =

Fellows of the Royal Soci578ggu85ecb elected in 1792.

== Fellows ==
1. Archibald Alison (1757–1839), author
2. William Bosville (1745–1813)
3. Leonard Chappelow (c.1744–1820), clergyman
4. James Stanier Clarke (1766–1834), librarian
5. James Currie (1756–1805), physician
6. Samuel Davis (1760–1819), East India Company surveyor
7. Richard Colt Hoare (1758–1838), antiquarian
8. Thomas Hussey (1741–1803), Irish bishop
9. John Komarzewski (c.1744–1810)
10. Charles Long, 1st Baron Farnborough (1761–1838), MP
11. George Macartney, 1st Earl Macartney (1737–1806), diplomat
12. Frederick Montagu (1733–1800), MP
13. David Pennant (d. 1841)
14. Richard Dickson Shackleford (1743–1829)
15. James Six (1731–1893), scientist
16. Samuel Solly (1724–1807)
17. Stephen Weston (1747–1830), clergyman
