= List of fellows of the Royal Society elected in 1880 =

Fellows of the Royal Society elected in 1880.

== Fellows ==
1. Thomas Clifford Allbutt (1836–1925)
2. John Attfield (1835–1911)
3. Thomas George Baring (1826–1904)
4. Alexander James Beresford-Hope (1820–1887)
5. Henry Francis Blanford (1834–1893)
6. William Henry Dallinger (1842–1909)
7. Henry Haversham Godwin-Austen (1834–1923)
8. Charles Graves (1812–1899)
9. David Edward Hughes (1831–1900)
10. Henry Martyn Jeffery (1826–1891)
11. Sir George Jessel (1824–1883)
12. Frederick McCoy (1823–1899)
13. John Fletcher Moulton (1844–1921)
14. Charles Niven (1845–1923)
15. John Rae (1813–1893)
16. James Emerson Reynolds (1844–1920)
17. William Turner Thiselton-Dyer (1843–1928)
18. William Augustus Tilden (1842–1926)
