= List of fellows of the Royal Society elected in 1805 =

Fellows of the Royal Society elected in 1805.

== Fellows ==
1. William Babington (1756–1833)
2. John Barrow (1764–1848)
3. William Blaquiere (1778–1851)
4. John Cust, 1st Earl Brownlow (1779–1853)
5. Nathaniel Dimsdale (1748–1811)
6. Robert Ferguson (1767–1840)
7. Thomas William Fermor, 4th Earl of Pomfret (1770–1833)
8. Frederick William Hervey, 5th Earl of Bristol (1769–1859)
9. Robert Holford (c.1758–1838)
10. Thomas Andrew Knight (1759–1838)
11. Edward Loveden Loveden (1751–1822)
12. George Paulet Morris (c.1760–1837)
13. Thomas Murdoch (1758–1846)
14. Stephen Peter Rigaud (1774–1839)
15. Edward Rudge (1763–1846)
16. William Cusack Smith (1766–1836)
17. Wilbraham Tollemache, 6th Earl of Dysart (1739–1821)
18. Olaus Warburg
19. Joseph Whidbey (1755–1833)
20. Edward Winnington (1749–1805) (Died before election)
