= List of fellows of the Royal Society elected in 1719 =

This is a list of fellows of the Royal Society elected in 1719.

== Fellows ==
- Charles Bale (1692–1730)
- John Bellers (c. 1654–1725)
- John Busby (fl. 1719)
- James Cavendish (c. 1673–1751)
- John Georges (fl. 1719–1738)
- William Man Godschall (1720–1802)
- William Gould (1715–1799)
- James Hill (1696–1727)
- Johann Georg Keyssler (1693–1743)
- Colin MacLaurin (1698–1746)
- John Meres (d. 1736)
- Isaac Rand (1674–1743)
- Albert Henri de Salengre (1694?–1723)
- Robert Smith (1689–1768)
- George Stanley (d. 1734)
- John Strachey (1671–1743)
- Moses Williams (1686–1742)
