= List of fellows of the Royal Society elected in 1692 =

This is a list of fellows of the Royal Society elected in 1692.

== Fellows ==
- Lord George Douglas (1657–1693)
- Joannes Dolaeus (1651–1707)
- David Gregory (1661–1708)
- Sir Charles Issac (1692–1711)
- George Mackenzie 1st Earl of Cromarty (1630–1714)
- Sir William Trumbull (1639–1716)
- Johann Theodor Heinson (1666–1726)
- Edward Lany (1667–1728)
- Edward Southwell (1671–1730)
- Ralph Lane (d. 1732)
- Jonas Blackwell (d. 1754)
