= List of fellows of the Royal Society elected in 1784 =

Fellows of the Royal Society elected in 1784.

== Fellows ==
1. Gilbert Blane (1749–1834), Royal physician
2. John Campbell, 4th Earl of Breadalbane (1762–1834)
3. James Cecil, 1st Marquess of Salisbury (1748–1823)
4. Charles Theodore, Elector Palatine of Bavaria (1724–1799)
5. George Edgcumbe, 1st Earl of Mount Edgcumbe (1721–1795)
6. Alexander Gordon, 4th Duke of Gordon (1743–1827)
7. Thomas Gresley (d. 1785), of Four Oaks, Warwickshire
8. Busick Harwood (c.1745–1814), Professor of Medicine
9. Henry Hugh Hoare (1762–1841)
10. George Kinnaird, 7th Lord Kinnaird (1745–1805)
11. Thomas Potter (1740–1801), Welsh judge
12. Luigi Malaspina di Sannazzaro, Marquis Sannazzaro (1754–1835)
13. John Sheldon (1752–1808), anatomist and surgeon
14. John Sinclair (1754–1835), barrister
15. Caleb Whitefoord (1734–1810), wine merchant, friend of Benjamin Franklin
16. Sir George Yonge (1731–1812), Secretary at War
