= List of fellows of the Royal Society elected in 1667 =

This is a list of fellows of the Royal Society elected in its eighth year, 1667.

== Fellows ==
- William Aglionby (1642–1705)
- Theodor de Beringhen (b. 1644)
- Maurice Berkeley (1628–1690)
- Charles Berkeley (1649–1710)
- Ismael Bullialdus (1605–1694)
- Henry Clerke (1622–1687)
- Sir Clifford Clifton (1626–1670)
- John Collins (1625–1683)
- Sir William Curtius (1599–1678)
- John Downes (1627–1694)
- Sir Bernard Gascoigne (1614–1687)
- Thomas Harley (d. 1685)
- Sir Thomas Lake (1657–1711)
- Johann Borkman Leyonbergh (1625–1691)
- Richard Lower (1631–1691)
- Jacques du Moulin (d. 1686)
- Walter Needham (1631–1691)
- Nicholas Oudart (d. 1681)
- John Pearson (1613–1686)
- Pierre Petit (1594–1677)
- John Ray (1627–1705)
- Bullen Reymes (1613–1672)
- Sir Philip Skippon (1641–1691)
- Francis Smethwick (d. 1682)
- Adam Smith (1723-1790)
- Sir William Soame (1644–1686)
- Sir Nicholas Stuart (1616–1710)
- Carlo Ubaldini (1665–1667)
