= William Ringrose Gelston Atkins =

Irish chemist

- Atkins in 1942.
- Born: 4 September 1884; Cork, Ireland
- Died: 4 April 1959 (aged 74)

William Ringrose Gelston Atkins OBE CBE (4 September 1884 – 4 April 1959) was an Irish chemist.

== Life and family ==
William Ringrose Gelston Atkins was born on 4 September 1884 in Cork. His father, Thomas Gelston Atkins, was a physician and surgeon. His mother was the daughter of the Very Reverend George Mignon Innes, Dean of St Paul's, London, Ontario. He attended Newtown School in Waterford, and entered Trinity College Dublin (TCD) in 1902 to study experimental science and natural science. He graduated in 1906.

In 1922 he married Ingaborg Jackson. They had one son, George Mignon Gelston. Atkins died on 4 April 1959.

== Career ==
Atkins' first job was in the chemistry department of TCD, and later the botany department. He co-authored 10 papers with Henry Horatio Dixon on osmotic pressure. He was involved in research into aeroplane materials during World War I in the National Physical Laboratory as Volunteer Assistant in the Division for Aeronautical Chemistry, including the most suitable timber for aeroplane propellers. He discovered that the addition of colloidal graphite to engine oil resulted in planes flying longer between oil changes. For this work he was awarded an OBE.

He returned to TCD after the war, but left to take up a position as research botanist at the Imperial Department of Agriculture in India. In 1921, he returned to England when he was appointed head of the department of general physiology in the Marine Biological Association's Laboratory, Plymouth. He was elected to the Royal Society in 1925, and in 1928 was awarded the Royal Dublin Society's Boyle Medal. He worked on atmospheric visibility for the Meteorological Office of the Air Ministry during World War II and was later awarded a CBE for his contributions.
