= List of fellows of the Royal Society elected in 1797 =

Fellows of the Royal Society elected in 1797.

== Fellows ==
1. George Aust (d. c.1829), Under Secretary of State for Foreign Affairs
2. William Battine (1765–1836), Barrister
3. Henry Browne (c.1754–1830), Barrister
4. James Brodie(1744–1824), MP
5. Robert Capper (1767–1851), barrister
6. Robert Clifford (1767–1817)
7. William Cumberland Cruikshank (1745–1800), surgeon
8. Stephen Eaton (d. 1806), Archdeacon of Middlesex
9. George Ellis (1753–1815), MP, poet, playwright
10. Samuel Ferris (died 1831), physician
11. Charles Freeman (d. 1823), Indian Civil Service
12. Andrew Snape Hamond (1738–1828), Comptroller of the Navy
13. Charles Hatchett (1765–1847), chemist and mineralogist
14. John Heaviside (1748–1828), surgeon
15. Robert Holmes, (1748–1805), Dean of Winchester
16. Daniel Lysons (1762–1834), clergyman
17. Samuel Lysons (1763–1819), barrister
18. Bartholomew Parr (1750–1810), physician
19. Edward Adolphus Seymour, 11th Duke of Somerset (1775–1855)
20. John Spalding (d. 1815), MP
21. Sir John St Aubyn, 5th Baronet (1758–1839), MP
22. Isaac Titsingh (d. 1812), Dutch merchant
23. John Towneley (d. 1814), Trustee of British Museum
24. George Whitmore (d. 1805)
25. George Wyndham, 3rd Earl of Egremont (1751–1837)
26. Prince William Frederick, Duke of Gloucester and Edinburgh (1776–1834), Royal Member
27. Frederick I of Württemberg (1754–1816), Honorary Member
