= List of fellows of the Royal Society elected in 1903 =

This is a list of fellows of the Royal Society elected in 1903.

== Fellows ==
- Thomas William Bridge (1848–1909)
- John Edward Stead (1851–1923)
- Johnson Symington (1851–1924)
- Sir William Maddock Bayliss (1860–1924)
- Sir Horace Darwin (1851–1928)
- Sir Aubrey Strahan (1852–1928)
- William Philip Hiern (1839–1929)
- Henry Reginald Arnulph Mallock (1851–1933)
- Sir David Orme Masson (1858–1937)
- Arthur George Perkin (1861–1937)
- Ernest Rutherford Baron Rutherford of Nelson (1871–1937)
- Ralph Allen Sampson (1866–1939)
- Alfred North Whitehead (1861–1947)
- Sydney Arthur Monckton Copeman (1862–1947)
- Sir John Sealy Edward Townsend (1868–1957)
