= List of fellows of the Royal Society elected in 1710 =

This is a list of fellows of the Royal Society elected in 1710.

== Fellows ==
- Joshua Barnes (1654–1712)
- Vendramino Bianchi (1667–1738)
- Owen Brigstocke (1679–1746)
- Alexander Geekie (d. 1727)
- John Machin (d. 1751)
- Giovanni Poleni (1683–1761)
- Joseph Tanner (d. 1724)
- Christian, Freiherr von Wolff (1679–1754)
