= List of fellows of the Royal Society elected in 1934 =

This is a list of people elected Fellow of the Royal Society in 1934.

== Fellows ==
- Abram Samoilovitch Besicovitch
- William Edward Curtis
- Sir Lewis Leigh Fermor
- Sir Paul Gordon Fildes
- Ronald Thomson Grant
- Martin Alister Campbell Hinton
- Sir Edmund Langley Hirst
- Sir Ernest Laurence Kennaway
- Anthony George Maldon Michell
- William Arthur Parks
- Harold Raistrick
- Alexander Oliver Rankine
- Robert Beresford Seymour Sewell
- Samuel Sugden
- William Taylor
- Hugh Hamshaw Thomas
- Alfred Young

== Foreign members ==
- Henri Leon Lebesgue
- Otto Heinrich Warburg

== Statute 12 Fellow ==
- Edgar Vincent, Viscount D'Abernon
