= List of fellows of the Royal Society elected in 1686 =

This is a list of fellows of the Royal Society elected in 1686.

== Fellows ==
- William Molyneux (1656–1698)
- Clopton Havers (1657–1702)
- Sir Robert Gordon (1647–1704)
- St George Ashe (1658–1718)
- John Harwood (1661–1731)
- Sir Thomas Molyneux (1661–1733)
- Thomas Meres (b. 1662)
