= List of fellows of the Royal Society elected in 1889 =

Fellows of the Royal Society elected in 1889.

== Fellows ==
1. John Aitken (1839–1919)
2. Edward Ballard (1820–1897)
3. Alfred Barnard Basset (1854–1930)
4. Horace Tabberer Brown (1848–1925)
5. Josiah Latimer Clark (1822–1898)
6. David Douglas Cunningham (1843–1914)
7. Lazarus Fletcher (1854–1921)
8. William Botting Hemsley (1843–1924)
9. Charles Thomas Hudson (1828–1903)
10. Thomas McKenny Hughes (1832–1917)
11. Edward Bagnall Poulton (1856–1943)
12. William Johnson Sollas (1849–1936)
13. Charles Todd (1826–1910)
14. Herbert Tomlinson (1846–1931)
15. Henry de Worms (1840–1903)
16. Gerald Francis Yeo (1845–1909)

== Foreign members ==
1. Stanislao Cannizzaro (1826–1910)
2. Jean Baptiste Auguste Chauveau (1827–1917)
3. Henry Augustus Rowland (1848–1901)
