= List of fellows of the Royal Society elected in 1890 =

Fellows of the Royal Society elected in 1890.

== Fellows ==
1. Benjamin Baker (1840–1907)
2. Robert Holford Macdowall Bosanquet (1841–1912)
3. Samuel Hawksley Burbury (1831–1911)
4. Walter Gardiner (1859–1941)
5. John Kerr (1824–1907)
6. Arthur Sheridan Lea (1853–1915)
7. Percy Alexander MacMahon (1854–1929)
8. Alfred Merle Norman (1831–1918)
9. Sir William Henry Perkin (1860–1929)
10. Percival Spencer Umfreville Pickering (1858–1920)
11. Isaac Roberts (1829–1904)
12. David Sharp (1840–1922)
13. Jethro Justinian Harris Teall (1849–1924)
14. Richard Thorne (1841–1899)
15. Walter Frank Raphael Weldon (1860–1906)
