= List of fellows of the Royal Society elected in 1939 =

This is a list of people elected Fellow of the Royal Society in 1939.

== Fellows ==
- Gilbert Smithson Adair
- Christopher Howard Andrewes
- Max Born
- Albert James Bradley
- Sir David Brunt
- Francis Albert Eley Crew
- Frederick Wallace Edwards
- Sir Bennett Melvill Jones
- George William Clarkson Kaye
- Edward George Tandy Liddell
- Ernest John Maskell
- Sir James Irvine Orme Masson
- Charles Edward Kenneth Mees
- Maxwell Herman Alexander Newman
- Herbert Harold Read
- Sir Reginald George Stapledon
- Hubert Maitland Turnbull
- Eustace Ebenezer Turner
- Sir Vincent Brian Wigglesworth
- Evan James Williams

== Foreign members ==
- Walter Bradford Cannon
- Herbert Max Finlay Freundlich
- George Charles de Hevesy

== Statue 12 ==
- William Richard Morris, 1st Viscount Nuffield
- John Davison Rockefeller
