= List of fellows of the Royal Society elected in 1669 =

This is a list of fellows of the Royal Society elected in its tenth year, 1669.

== Fellows ==
- Thomas Barrington (b. 1648)
- George Castle (1635–1673)
- Urban Hiarne (1641–1724)
- James Hoare (1642–1679)
- Anthony Horneck (1641–1697)
- Edward Jeffreys (1655–1702)
- Marcello Malpighi (1628–1694)
- Gaspar Merez de Souza (1669–1684)
- Georg Stiernhielm (1598–1672)
- Silas Titus (1623–1704)
