= List of fellows of the Royal Society elected in 1707 =

This is a list of fellows of the Royal Society elected in 1707.

== Fellows ==
- Thomas Ayres (d. 1715)
- Thomas Frankland (c. 1683–1747)
- William Frankland (d. 1714)
- James Graham, 1st Duke of Montrose (c. 1680–1742)
- Rowland Holt (c. 1652–1711)
- Thomas Hoy (1659–c. 1718)
- John Ker, 1st Duke of Roxburghe (c. 1680–1741)
- Benjamin Morland (c. 1653–1733)
- Henry Plumtre (d. 1746)
- Thomas Trevor, 1st Baron Trevor (1658–1730)
- James Venables (d. 1737)
