= List of fellows of the Royal Society elected in 1906 =

This is a list of fellows of the Royal Society elected in 1906.

== Fellows ==
- Sir George Thomas Beilby (1850–1924)
- Charles William Andrews (1866–1924)
- Edward Cecil Guinness 1st Earl of Iveagh (1847–1927)
- Richard Burdon Haldane Viscount Haldane of Cloan (1856–1928)
- Walter Heape (1855–1929)
- Thomas John I'Anson Bromwich (1875–1929)
- Archibald Byron Macallum (1858–1934)
- James Ernest Marsh (1860–1938)
- Arthur William Patrick Albert Duke of Connaught and Strathearn (1850–1942)
- Sir Henry George Lyons (1864–1944)
- Sir Peter Chalmers Mitchell (1864–1945)
- Sir James Hopwood Jeans (1877–1946)
- Sir Almroth Edward Wright (1861–1947)
- Frederick Frost Blackman (1866–1947)
- Philip Herbert Cowell (1870–1949)
- Charles Herbert Lees (1864–1952)
- Sir James Swinburne (1858–1958)
- Harold Albert Wilson (1874–1964)
