= List of fellows of the Royal Society elected in 1679 =

This is a list of fellows of the Royal Society elected in its 20th year, 1679.

== Fellows ==
- William Naper (d. 1683)
- Thomas Pigot (1657–1686)
- Thomas Sheridan (1646–1688)
- Henry Paman (1623–1695)
- Sir William Waller (1639–1699)
- William Bridgeman (1646–1699)
- Edward Tyson (1650–1708)
- Ezekiel Spanheim Freiherr von (1629–1710)
- Giovanni Ambrosio Sarotti (1679–1714)
