= List of fellows of the Royal Society elected in 1717 =

This is a list of fellows of the Royal Society elected in 1717.

== Fellows ==
- Henry Barham (c. 1670–1726)
- Roger Gale (1672–1744)
- Orlando Gee (fl. 1717–1723)
- John Hadley (1682–1744)
- Johann August Hugo (1686–1716)
- Walter Jeffreys (fl. 1717–1753)
- James Jurin (1684–1750)
- Edmond Littlehales (c. 1690–1724)
- Ludovico Antonio Muratori (1673–1750)
- Samuel Scheurer (1685–1749)
- Francesco Torti (1658–1741)
- Elihu Yale (1649–1721)
