= List of fellows of the Royal Society elected in 1676 =

This is a list of fellows of the Royal Society elected in its 17th year, 1676.

== Fellows ==
- Sir Thomas Clutterbuck (1627–1683)
- Sir Richard Edgcumbe (1640–1688)
- Henry Hall (1670–1692)
- Sir Henry Sheers (d. 1710)
- John Mapletoft (1631–1721)
- Francesco Travagino (b. 1613)
- John King (b. 1648)
