= List of fellows of the Royal Society elected in 1917 =

This is a list of people elected Fellow of the Royal Society in 1917.

== Fellows ==
- James Hartley Ashworth
- Sir Leonard Bairstow
- Grenville Arthur James Cole
- Charles Frederick Cross
- Henry Drysdale Dakin
- Arthur Stewart Eve
- Sir Herbert Jackson
- John Smyth Macdonald
- John William Nicholson
- Sir Robert Howson Pickard
- Charles Tate Regan
- Sir Robert Robertson
- Sir Edward John Russell
- Samuel George Shattock
- Frederick Ernest Weiss
