= List of fellows of the Royal Society elected in 1920 =

This is a list of people elected Fellow of the Royal Society in 1920.

== Fellows ==
- Edward Frankland Armstrong
- Sir Jagadis Chunder Bose
- Robert Broom
- Edward Provan Cathcart
- Alfred Chaston Chapman
- Arthur Prince Chattock
- Sir Arthur William Hill
- Cargill Gilston Knott
- Frederick Alexander Lindemann, Viscount Cherwell
- Francis Hugh Adam Marshall
- Sir Thomas Ralph Merton
- Robert Cyril Layton Perkins
- Henry Crozier Keating Plummer
- Sir Robert Robinson
- John William Watson Stephens

== Statute 12 ==
- Herbert Albert Laurens Fisher
- Sir James George Frazer
