= James Carkesse =

James Carkesse (c.1636–after 1683) was an English naval official and schoolteacher, a Fellow of the Royal Society now known for poetry written in Bethlem Hospital and an asylum in Finsbury.

== Life ==
Carkesse was educated at Westminster School and Magdalen College, Oxford. He became head of Magdalen College School, in 1663, and was elected F.R.S. in 1664. He worked in the Naval Office in London later in the 1660s, clerking under William Brouncker in 1666. There he was known to Samuel Pepys, and Pepys's Diary gives details of Carkesse and his dismissal from the office in 1667 and reinstatement. He finally lost his position, in 1673.

In the later 1670s he became delusional, and wrote a volume Lucida intervalla (1679) of doggerel verse, by which he is now remembered. He was confined in the private asylum of Thomas Allen at Finsbury, and then in the Bethlem Hospital, as indicated by the subtitle of the book. In 1683 he was head of Chelmsford School.
