= List of fellows of the Royal Society elected in 1937 =

This is a list of people elected Fellow of the Royal Society in 1937.

== Fellows ==
- John Desmond Bernal
- Albert Charles Chibnall
- George Roger Clemo
- Sir Alan Nigel Drury
- Harold Munro Fox
- William Edward Garner
- Sydney Goldstein
- Percival Hartley
- Herbert Leader Hawkins
- John Ernest Holloway
- William Hume-Rothery
- Thomas Godfrey Mason
- James Reid Moir
- Sir Marcus Laurence Elwin Oliphant
- Carl Frederick Abel Pantin
- Sir David Randall Pye
- Edmund Clifton Stoner

== Foreign members ==
- Schack August Steenberg Krogh
- Otto Fritz Meyerhof
- Henry Norris Russell

== Statute 12 ==
- Alexander Augustus Frederick William Alfred George Cambridge, Earl of Athlone
