= List of fellows of the Royal Society elected in 1898 =

Fellows of the Royal Society elected in 1898.

== Fellows ==
1. Henry Frederick Baker (1866–1956)
2. Ernest William Brown (1866–1938)
3. Alexander Buchan (1829–1907)
4. George Nathaniel Curzon (1859–1925)
5. Sidney Frederic Harmer (1862–1950)
6. Nathaniel Lindley (1828–1921)
7. Arthur Lister (1830–1908)
8. Sir Herbert Eustace Maxwell (1845–1937)
9. Charles Alexander McMahon (1830–1904)
10. William Osler (1849–1919)
11. Charles Algernon Parsons (1854–1931)
12. Thomas Preston (1860–1900)
13. Edward Waymouth Reid (1862–1948)
14. Alexander Scott (1853–1947)
15. Albert Seward (1863–1941)
16. William Ashwell Shenstone (1850–1908)
17. Henry Martyn Taylor (1842–1927)
18. James Wimshurst (1832–1903)
