= List of fellows of the Royal Society elected in 1674 =

This is a list of fellows of the Royal Society elected in its 15th year, 1674.

== Fellows ==
- Sir Jonas Moore (1617–1679)
- Edmund Castell (1606–1685)
- Renatus Franciscus Slusius (1622–1685)
- Giovan Battista Pacichelli (1634–1695)
- Henry Jenkes (d. 1697)
