= List of fellows of the Royal Society elected in 1693 =

This is a list of fellows of the Royal Society elected in 1693.

== Fellows ==
- Georg Franck-von- Franckenau (1644–1704)
- Thomas Kirke (1650–1706)
- John Henley (1693–1706)
- Robert Briggs (1660–1718)
- Charles Bodvill Robartes 2nd Earl of Radnor (1660–1723)
- John Woodward (1665–1728)
- Thomas Willoughby 1st Baron Middleton (1670–1729)
- Christopher Wren the Younger (1675–1747)
