= List of fellows of the Royal Society elected in 1661 =

This is a complete list of fellows of the Royal Society elected in its second year, 1661.

== Fellows ==
- Elias Ashmole (1617–1692)
- John Gauden (1605–1662)
- Francis Glisson (1597–1677)
- Sir Robert Harley (1626–1673)
- Mungo Murray (1599–1670)
- Thomas Pockley (d. 1661)
- George Villiers (1628–1687)
- Richard White (1590–1682)
