= List of fellows of the Royal Society elected in 1909 =

This is a list of fellows of the Royal Society elected in 1909.

== Fellows ==
- Edward Charles Cyril Baly (1871–1948)
- Sir Thomas Barlow (1845–1945)
- Ernest William Barnes (1874–1953)
- Francis Arthur Bather (1863–1934)
- Sir Robert Abbott Hadfield (1858–1940)
- Sir Alfred Daniel Hall (1864–1942)
- Sir Arthur Harden (1865–1940)
- Alfred John Jukes-Browne (1851–1914)
- Sir John Graham Kerr (1869–1957)
- William James Lewis (1847–1926)
- John Alexander McClelland (1870–1920)
- William McFadden Orr (1866–1934)
- Alfred Barton Rendle (1865–1938)
- James Lorrain Smith (1862–1931)
- James Thomas Wilson (1861–1945)

== Foreign members ==
- George Ellery Hale (1868–1938)
- Hugo Kronecker (1839–1914)
- Charles Emile Picard (1856–1941)
- Santiago Ramon y Cajal (1852–1934)
