= List of fellows of the Royal Society elected in 1948 =

This is a list of people elected Fellow of the Royal Society in 1948.

== Fellows ==
- Thomas Edward Allibone
- Frank Philip Bowden
- Hayne Constant
- Sir Richard Stafford Cripps
- Stanley Fabes Dorey
- Ernest Harold Farmer
- Otto Robert Frisch
- Sir John Claud Fortescue Fryer
- Thomas Maxwell Harris
- Walter Heinrich Heitler
- Sir Alan Lloyd Hodgkin
- George Martin Lees
- Kurt Mahler
- Sidnie Milana Manton
- Robert Alexander McCance
- Dorothy Mary Moyle Needham
- James Herbert Orton
- Sir Leonard Gregory Parsons
- Stanley Peat
- Gilbert Wooding Robinson
- William Albert Hugh Rushton
- John Walter Ryde
- George Robert Sabine Snow
- Edgar William Richard Steacie
- John Arthur Todd
- Frank Yates

== Foreign members ==
- Detlev Wulf Bronk
- Luitzen Egbertus Jan Brouwer
- Maurice Jules Gaston Corneille Caullery
- Linus Carl Pauling
