= Henry Card =

English cleric and writer (1779–1844)

Henry Card (1779–1844) was an English cleric and writer.

== Life ==
Born at Egham, Surrey, Card was educated at Westminster School and Pembroke College, Oxford, where he entered in 1797. He proceeded B.A. 1800, M.A. 1805, B.D. and D.D. 1823.

In 1815 Card was presented to the vicarage of Great Malvern, Worcestershire, and in 1832 to that of Dormington, Herefordshire. He was elected a fellow of the Royal Society 2 March 1820, and was also fellow of the Society of Antiquaries of London, and of the Royal Historical Society. He died ("from the consequencies of the amputation of his leg") at Great Malvern 4 August 1844.

== Works ==
Card wrote:

- The History of the Revolutions of Russia, 2nd ed. 1804.
- Historical Outlines of the Rise and Establishment of the Papal Power, Margate, 1804.
- Thoughts on Domestic or Private Education, 1807.
- The Reign of Charlemagne, considered chiefly with reference to Religion, Laws, Literature, and Manners, 1807.
- Literary Recreations, Liverpool, 2nd ed. 1811.
- Beauford, or a Picture of High Life, a novel, 2 vols. 1811.
- An Essay on the Holy Eucharist, 1814.
- The Brother-in-Law, a comedy, Lee Priory Private Press, 1817.
- A Dissertation on the Sacrament of the Lord's Supper, or the futation of the Hoadlyan Scheme of it, 4th ed. 1821.
- The Uses of the Athanasian Creed explained and vindicated, a sermon, 4th ed. Worester, 1825.
- A Letter to the Duke of Wellington on the Reasonableness of a Church Reform, 1830.
- A Dissertation on the Antiquities of the Priory of Great Malvern, 1834.
