= Martin D. Dawson =

British physicist

Martin D. Dawson FRS FRSE FInstP FIEEE
- Born: 1960 (age 65–66)
- Education: Imperial College London
- Known for: Photonics microLEDs VECSELs diamond photonics
- Scientific career
- Fields: Photonics
- Workplaces: University of Strathclyde
- Doctoral advisor: Wilson Sibbett
- Website: www.photonics.ac.uk

Martin D. Dawson (born 1960) is a British professor of photonics. He serves as the research director of the Institute of Photonics at the University of Strathclyde and is head of Fraunhofer Centre for Applied Photonics.

== Career ==
Dawson is a physicist known for his work on lasers, microLEDs and compound semiconductors. He is Director of Research in the University of Strathclyde's Institute of Photonics, which he helped establish in 1996, and he was also appointed inaugural Head of the Fraunhofer Centre for Applied Photonics in 2012.

Dawson has contributed to the development of vertical external-cavity surface-emitting lasers.(VECSELS). He has developed optically pumped VECSELS since 1997 and has achieved a number of world firsts in this field, for example the first tunable single frequency operation of such lasers.

His work was instrumental to the development of gallium nitride (GaN) micro-LEDs. His microLED array work has also established their use as a light source for optogenetics applications and for Li -Fi and visible light communications.

== Awards and recognition ==
- 2016 Gabor Medal and Prize from the Institute of Physics
- 2016 Aron Kessel Award from the IEEE Photonics Society
- 2021 Nick Holonyak Award from the Optical Society
