= Paul Bates (hydrologist) =

British hydrologist

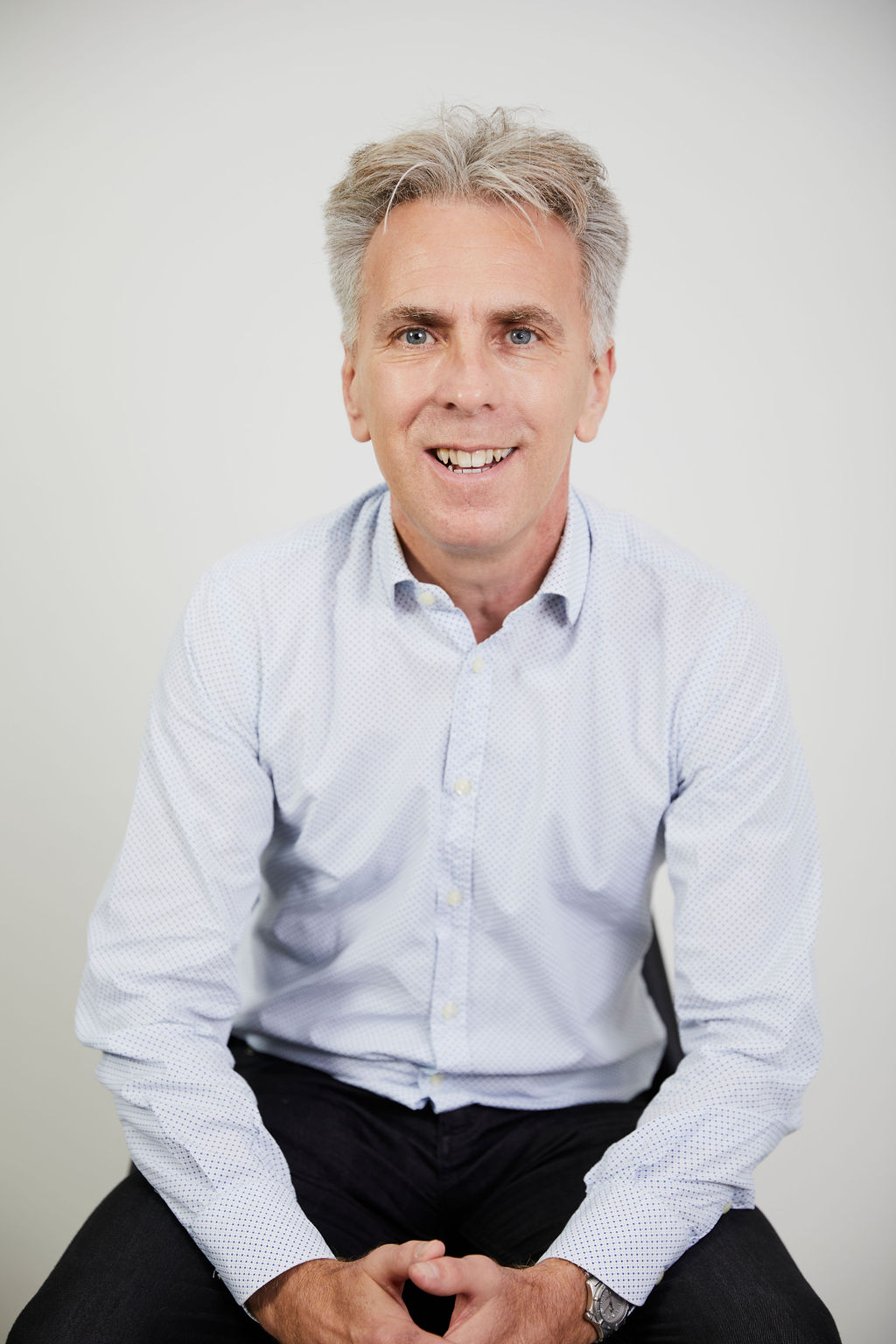
- Awards: John Dalton Medal (2024) Fellow of the Royal Society (2021) Commander of the British Empire for services to flood risk management (2019) NERC Impact Award (2015) Fellow of the American Geophysical Union (2015) Lloyd's of London Science of Risk prize (2012)

Academic background
- Education: University of Southampton (BSc)
- Alma mater: University of Bristol (PhD)
- Thesis: Finite element of modelling of floodplain inundation (1992)

Academic work
- Discipline: Professor of Hydrology
- Institutions: University of Bristol
- Notable students: Hannah Cloke

Paul David Bates CBE FRS is a hydrologist, working as Professor of Hydrology at the University of Bristol and Chairman of Fathom, a water risk intelligence firm that he cofounded. He was Director of the University of Bristol's Cabot Institute of the Environment from 2011 to 2013 and subsequently Head of Bristol's School of Geographical Sciences (2013–2017).

In 2012, Bates was awarded the Lloyd's of London Science of Risk prize for his work on numerical solutions of the local inertial form of the shallow water equations. He was elected as a Fellow of the American Geophysical Union in 2015 and received a Royal Society Wolfson Research Merit Award in 2017. He was made a Commander of the Most Excellent Order of the British Empire for services to flood risk management in the 2019 Queen's Birthday Honours and elected a Fellow of the Royal Society in 2021.

In 2024, Bates received the John Dalton Medal for distinguished research in the hydrology field. He was the recipient of the American Society of Civil Engineers 2025 Ven Te Chow Award, which recognises lifetime achievement in the field of hydrological engineering.

== Education ==
Bates is a graduate of the University of Southampton, where he completed a BSc in Geography in 1989 before moving to University of Bristol to study for a PhD, graduating in 1993. His PhD research analysed finite element methods for modelling flood flows.

== Career ==
Bates has published over 270 papers in international journals, which between them have been cited more than 40,000 times, as well as writing for The Conversation and The Guardian.

He is noted for the development of the LISFLOOD-FP hydrodynamic model which solves the local inertial form of the shallow water equations in two dimensions, with channel flows represented as a sub-grid scale feature. The numerical scheme employed in LISFLOOD-FP allows its application to continental-to-global scale domains at spatial resolutions below 100 m, for both present day and future conditions under scenarios representing climate and socio-economic change. The code, or clones of it, are now used by multiple engineering firms, insurers, banks, governments, research firms and NGOs around the world to help manage and mitigate flood risk. To validate these predictions Bates uses data from optical and synthetic-aperture radar satellites in combination with airborne and ground data to quantify their uncertainty.

Bates is one of the UK scientists working on the Surface Water and Ocean Topography mission (SWOT), a satellite altimeter that measures the Earth's surface water every 21 days. Bates leads a project calibrating the accuracy of the mission by comparing satellite and surface recordings of the changing height of the surface of the Bristol Channel.

In 2013 Bates co-founded Fathom, a flood risk analytics firm based in Bristol, UK, with his then PhD students Chris Sampson and Andy Smith and academic colleague Jeff Neal.
