= Chattaway =

Chattaway is a surname. Notable people with the surname include:

- Frederick Daniel Chattaway (1860–1944), Fellow of the Royal Society, elected 1907
- Jay Chattaway (born 1946), American composer

== See also ==
- Chataway
