= Georg Bredig =

German chemist (1868–1944)

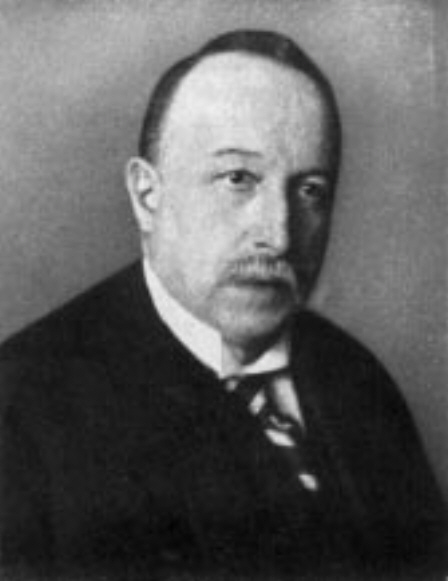
- Born: October 1, 1868; Glogau, Niederschlesien, Silesia Province
- Died: April 24, 1944 (aged 75); New York City, New York, US
- Education: Friedrich-Wilhelm University, Berlin; University of Leipzig
- Known for: Catalysis
- Spouse: Rosa Fraenkel
- Scientific career
- Fields: Physical chemistry
- Workplaces: University of Leipzig (1895-1901); Heidelberg (1901–1910); Technische Hochschule, Zurich (1910); Technische Hochschule, Karlsruhe (1911–1933)
- Doctoral advisor: Wilhelm Ostwald

Georg Bredig (October 1, 1868 – April 24, 1944) was a German physical chemist. Bredig was a faculty member at the University of Leipzig (1895-1901) and professor of chemistry at Heidelberg (1901–1910); Technische Hochschule, Zurich (1910); and Technische Hochschule, Karlsruhe (1911–1933).

Bredig did fundamental research in catalysis, preparing aqueous colloidal dispersions of metals and comparing the catalytic properties of metal colloids to the action of enzymes (or "ferments"). He made significant contributions in reaction kinetics and electrochemistry.

Despite being a respected scientist in his field, Bredig was forced to leave the university by the National Socialists in 1933, ending his teaching and research career. Princeton University offered Bredig a pro forma position, enabling him to emigrate to the United States in 1940.

== Life ==
Georg Bredig was the father of Max Bredig and his wife Ernestine (Troplowitz) Bredig. He was born on October 1, 1868, in Glogau, Niederschlesien, Silesia Province. The family was of Jewish descent, but Bredig identified himself as a Protestant. Like Fritz Haber, another German chemist of Jewish descent, Bredig felt a deeply patriotic attachment to Germany.

=== Education and early catalysis research ===
In 1886, Bredig began studying natural sciences at the Albert-Ludwigs-University of Freiburg. After one term, he moved to Friedrich-Wilhelm University in Berlin (later Humboldt University of Berlin) where he studied from 1886-1889. Among his teachers were August Wilhelm von Hofmann, August Kundt, Siegmund Gabriel and Wilhelm Will (1854-1919). Will was instrumental in introducing Bredig to the work of Wilhelm Ostwald of the University of Leipzig, and the new field of physical chemistry. Fascinated by this branch of research, Bredig moved to the University of Leipzig in autumn 1889. There he studied with Ostwald, earning his doctorate in 1894 with a two-part dissertation, discussing I. Beiträge zur Stöchiometrie. Ionenbewegung; II. Über die Affinitätsgrößen d. Basen, (I. Contributions to stoichiometry. Ion motion; II. About the affinities of Bases). Another outcome of his work was that Bredig introduced the idea of a Zwitterion, a dipolar ion with at least one positive and one negative functional group, and a net charge of zero.

Bredig spent the next year and a half doing postdoctoral work at the laboratories of J. H. van't Hoff in Amsterdam, M. Berthelot in Paris and S. Arrhenius in Stockholm. In autumn 1895, he returned to the University of Leipzig as an assistant to Wilhelm Ostwald. The two men had much in common, including interests in pacifism and internationalism.

In 1898 Bredig discovered that it is possible to make colloidal solutions of metals usable as catalysts. Bredig's arc method became the preferred chemical method of creating metallic solutions. He expanded upon this work by studying and comparing the activity of metal colloids and that of inorganic ferments (his name for biological enzymes). In 1899, the Deutsche Elektrochemische Gesellschaft (German Electrochemical Society, founded 1894) awarded an honorary prize to Bredig for his work.

Bredig habilitated in Leipzig in 1901, publishing the dissertation Anorganische Fermente (Inorganic ferments). He was granted his teaching licence (venia legendi) after speaking on the topic "Über die Chemie der extremen Temperaturen" ("On the chemistry of extreme temperatures").

In 1901 Bredig married Rosa Fraenkel. The couple had two children, Max Albert Bredig (1902-1977) and Marianne Bredig (1903-1987). Max Albert Bredig also became a chemist, eventually working at Oak Ridge National Laboratory. Marianne Bredig married Dr. Viktor Homburger.

=== Research at Heidelberg and Zurich ===
Also in 1901, Bredig was appointed as associate professor at the University of Heidelberg, the first professor there in physical chemistry. With the support of Theodor Curtius at Heidelberg, Bredig was able to establish his own research program, which led to great progress in catalytic research. One of his achievements at Heidelberg was the first catalytic synthesis of asymmetric carbon compounds, selectively synthesizing specific stereoisomer molecules. In addition to catalysis, his primary areas of research were reaction kinetics and electrochemistry. In addition to his work on organic and inorganic catalysts, he and his students contributed to the areas of kinetics of adiabatic reactions, amphoteric electrolytes and ampholytic ions, and the catalytic decomposition kinetics of ethyl diazoacetate.

As a teacher, he attracted many young scientists from all over the world. Among Bredig's students at Heidelberg were Kasimir Fajans, James William McBain, and Andreas von Antropoff.

In 1910 Bredig was appointed as full professor at Technische Hochschule, Zurich.

=== Technische Hochschule, Karlsruhe ===
In 1911, Bredig was appointed as professor for physical chemistry at the Technische Hochschule, Karlsruhe. The chair of physical chemistry at Karlsruhe was created in 1900 and held first by Max Le Blanc (1900-1905), and then by Fritz Haber (1905-1911). Haber left to become Headmaster of the newly founded Kaiser Wilhelm Institute for Physical Chemistry and Electrochemistry in Berlin. Haber and Bredig, in spite of great differences in personality and political positions, were good friends.

Bredig's students at Karlsruhe included Michael Polanyi. Bredig sent Polyani's work on the third law of thermodynamics to Albert Einstein for review, beginning a correspondence between them.

World War I and its aftermath were extremely disruptive to work in Bredig's institute at Karlsruhe. Most of the students had to leave. Bredig may have worked as assistant to the Red Cross during the war.

The postwar-period was dominated by time-consuming teaching duties and administrative work. It was difficult to obtain supplies due to shortages and hyperinflation. In 1922, Bredig participated in the International Chemical Reunion in Utrecht, the first meeting of chemists from Germany, Austria, England and the USA since the beginning of the war. It was a step towards the rebuilding of peaceful discourse and scientific internationalism, led by Bredig's friend Ernst Cohen and his colleague Hugo Rudolph Kruyt of the University of Utrecht.

On December 9, 1922, Bredig became Rector (headmaster) at Karlsruhe. In his inaugural speech, Denkmethoden der Chemie (Thinking Methods of Chemistry), Bredig was open about his political beliefs, which could be described as liberal-democratic, supporting pacifism and internationalism. This caught the negative attention of the National Socialists.

Bredig had to undergo surgery twice in 1924 and 1929/30 but he recovered quickly and was able to return to his work.

=== Persecution and exile ===
External videos
- Science and Survival, Science History Institute, January 2023, 8:55

On January 30, 1933 Adolf Hitler and the National Socialist (Nazi) party assumed power, and began to use a variety of laws to enforce their agenda. As early as April 7, 1933, the Law for the Restoration of the Professional Civil Service banned Jews and other persons who the Nazis considered unfit to hold office from the German Civil Service and German universities. This created large numbers of vacancies: an estimated 26% of chemists and biochemists were driven from posts at German and Austrian universities.

Required with other professors at German universities to take an oath of allegiance pledging his loyalty to Adolf Hitler, Bredig refused. He was forced out of the university in 1933 by the National Socialists, ending his teaching and research activities. The "retirement" of Bredig and other senior scientists such as Stefan Goldschmidt and Paul Askenasy left a significant gap in the university's expertise. In addition Bredig suffered the loss of his wife, who died in 1933. Regardless, he remained in Karlsruhe.

His son Max Albert Bredig was warned by colleagues and left his job in Berlin in 1937, taking only his books. He succeeded in reaching Sweden, England, and eventually the United States, joining Kasimir Fajans at the University of Michigan. From the United States, he worked to rescue his father, his sister, her husband, and others. In November 1938, during Kristallnacht, most of the male Jewish population of Karlsruhe was arrested and sent to Dachau concentration camp. Georg Bredig and his son-in-law Dr. Viktor Homburger were among the 500 Jews arrested. They were released after showing proof of their intention to emigrate.

In 1939 Bredig was persuaded to leave Germany for the Netherlands. His long-time friend Ernst Cohen helped him to get an entry permit. Ironically, Cohen himself would die in Auschwitz concentration camp. Princeton University offered Bredig a pro forma position, enabling him to reach the United States in 1940. He was in poor health, and stayed with his son in New York City until he died on April 24, 1944.

Bredig was concerned that the Nazis would destroy his papers. Before leaving, he sent his letters, books, photographs, and scientific notes out of Nazi Germany to the Netherlands where they were kept in safety until the end of World War II. In 1946 his papers were returned to the Bredig family, who were then in the United States. In 2019, the Science History Institute acquired the archival collection. It covers the period from the late 19th century to the late 1930s, including the Nazis' rise to power.

== Works ==
- Bredig, Georg (1894). Beiträge zur Stöchiometrie der Ionenbeweglichkeit. Leipzig: W. Engelmann.
- Hoff, J. H. van't (1900). Bredig, Georg (ed.). Die gesetze des chemischen gleichgewichtes für den verdünnten, gasförmigen oder gelösten zustand. Leipzig: W. Engelmann.
- Bredig, Georg (1901). Über die chemie der extremen temperaturen. Leipzig: S. Hirzel.
- Bredig, Georg (1901). Anorganische Fermente, Darstellung kolloidaler Metalle auf elektrischem Wege und Untersuchung ihrer katalytischen Eigenschaften. Kontaktchemische Studie. Leipzig: W. Engelmann.
- Bredig, Georg, ed. (1905–1926). Handbuch der angewandten physikalischen Chemie. Leipzig: J.A. Barth. pp. 14 v.
- Ostwald, William (1923). Bredig, Georg (ed.). Über katalyse. Ostwalds Klassiker der exakten wissenschaften. Leipzig: Akademische verlagsgesellschaft m. b. h.
- Bredig, Georg (1923). Denkmethoden der Chemie. Leipzig: J.A. Barth.
- Bredig, Georg (1938). Seinen Freunden zur Erinnerung (PDF). Köthen: P. Dünnhaupt. Archived from the original (PDF) on 2019-05-07. (Autobiography).

== Awards ==
- 1899 prize, Deutsche Elektrochemische Gesellschaft (German Electrochemical Society)
- 1914 prize, Solvay Institute in Brüssels, for his work on catalysis
- 1929 Honorary doctor of University Rostock
- 1930 Honorary doctor of TH Zurich

== Literature ==
- Haber, F. (1928). "Bredig zum 60. Geburtstag". Zeitschrift für Elektrochemie und Angewandte Physikalische Chemie (Oktober): 677–679. doi:10.1002/bbpc.19280341002.
- Collatz, Klaus-Günter (2000). Lexikon der Naturwissenschaftler : Astronomen, Biologen, Chemiker, Geologen, Mediziner, Physiker. Heidelberg, Berlin: Spektrum Akademischer Verlag. ISBN 9783827410269.
- Wehefritz, Valentin (1998). Pionier der physikalischen Chemie Prof. Dr. Georg Bredig (1868-1944). Ein deutsches Gelehrtenschicksal im 20. Jahrhundert. Universitätsbibliothek Dortrnund.
