= Conditioned compensatory response =

Conditioned compensatory response (CR) is an automatic response that is opposite to the effect of alcohol or substance usage. Conditioned behavior is a key part of substance addiction. This response has many implications. For instance, a drug user will be most tolerant to the drug in the presence of cues that have been associated with it, because such cues elicit compensatory responses. As a result, overdose is usually not due to an increase in dosage, but due to taking the drug in a new place without familiar cues, which would have otherwise allowed the user to tolerate the drug. CR includes a heightened pain sensitivity, and decreased body temperature, and might cause discomfort, thus motivating the drug user to continue usage of the drug. This is one of several ways classical conditioning might be a factor in drug addiction and dependence.

In a classic experiment, Shepard Siegel conditioned rats with morphine. Later the rats were exposed to the same environmental stimuli that had been associated with morphine but did not receive the drug. The CR was opposite to the effects of morphine, and the rats experienced hyperalgesia. Siegel suggested that compensatory CRs allow the organism to maintain a normal physiological state despite the administration of a drug and that they help to explain tolerance to drugs. The conditioned compensatory response may take place only in the case of subconscious learning, as the effects of conscious expectancies may tend to be in the direction of the expectation. Therefore, conditioning may lead either to a placebo analgesic response to morphine or a compensatory response.

== See also ==
- Substance use disorder
