= Sol (colloid) =

Colloidal suspension of very small solid particles in a continuous liquid medium

A sol is a colloid made out of tiny solid particles in a continuous liquid medium. Sols are stable, so that they do not settle down when left undisturbed, and exhibit the Tyndall effect, which is the scattering of light by the particles in the colloid. The size of the particles can vary from 1 nm - 100 nm. Examples include blood, pigmented ink, cell fluids, paint, antacids and mud.

Artificial sols can be prepared by two main methods: dispersion and condensation. In the dispersion method, solid particles are reduced to colloidal dimensions through techniques such as ball milling and Bredig's arc method. In the condensation method, small particles are formed from larger molecules through a chemical reaction.

The stability of sols can be maintained through the use of dispersing agents, which prevent the particles from clumping together or settling out of the suspension. Sols are often used in the sol-gel process, in which a sol is converted into a gel through the addition of a crosslinking agent.

In a sol, solid particles are dispersed in a liquid continuous phase, while in an emulsion, liquid droplets are dispersed in a liquid or semi-solid continuous phase.
