= Differential effects =

Branch of statistics concerned with inferring treatment effects

Differential effects play a special role in certain observational studies in which treatments are not assigned to subjects at random, where differing outcomes may reflect biased assignments rather than effects caused by the treatments.

== Definition ==
For two treatments, differential effects is the effect of applying one treatment in lieu of the other. Differential effects are not immune to differential biases, whose possible consequences are examined by sensitivity analysis.

== Methods ==
In statistics and data science, causality is often tested via regression analysis. Several methods can be used to distinguish actual differential effects from spurious correlations. First, the balancing score (namely propensity score) matching method can be implemented for controlling the covariate balance. Second, the difference-in-differences (DID) method with a parallel trend assumption (2 groups would show a parallel trend if neither of them experienced the treatment effect) is a useful method to reduce the impact of extraneous factors and selection bias. The differential effect of treatments (DET) was explored using several examples and models.

In the biomedicine area, differential effects of early hippocampal pathology were investigated on episodic and semantic memory. The differential effects of apolipoproteins E3 and E4 were also examined on neuronal growth in vitro.

== See also ==
- Randomization
- Causality
- Causal inference
- Differential outcomes effect
