= David Whiffen =

English physicist

David Hardy Whiffen FRS (15 August 1922 – 2 December 2002) was an English physicist and pioneer of infrared and Electron Spin Resonance known for the "Whiffen Effect".

== Life ==
He was born in Esher, Surrey into a family of chemical manufacturers and educated in Broadstairs, Kent and at Oundle. He gained a 1st Class Honours Degree at Oxford in 1943 under eminent physicist Sir Harold Warris Thompson and continued the pursuit of postgraduate research with Thompson until 1949. He worked in a number of areas including Radar and fuel analysis during the war.

He spent a year in 1946-47 at the Bell Telephone Research Laboratories at Murray Hill, New Jersey, working with five Nobel Laureates. In nine months Whiffen developed a sensitive experimental cell usable over a wide range of temperature.

On his return to England he accepted a post as lecturer in the Chemistry Department at Birmingham University from 1949 to 1959. Most of his papers at that time pushed the boundaries on infra red absorption frequencies of materials.

He then became head of the Molecular Science Division at the National Physics Laboratory (NPL) from 1959 to 1968, leaving to be successively Head of Physical Chemistry, Professor of Physics, Dean of Science and Pro-Vice-Chancellor at Newcastle University between 1968 and 1983.

His primary area of expertise during those years was radiation and how it is absorbed by materials and what this tells us about the radiation and the materials themselves. Whiffen worked out the electron-spin resonance signal of a free radical in a crystal lattice. He was a spectroscopist, chemical physicist, specialist in wave superposition, the interaction between radiation and matter, and a pioneer in ESR (Electron Spin Resonance) and later NMR (Nuclear Magnetic Resonance). He was elected a Fellow of the Royal Society in 1966.

He retired in 1985 to Somerset where he died aged 80. He had married Jean Bell in Glasgow in 1949. Their four sons survived him.

== The Whiffen Effect ==
Spin paired molecules. In EPR spectroscopy of organic radicals the effect explains the way hyperconjugative proton coupling in a cyclic radical can be enhanced or forbidden according to the symmetry of the orbital with which it hyperconjugates, opening the way to other work in the field.

== Other significant contributions ==
He was known as a very practical man, but with deep intellect and understanding. He constructed a 9 GHz Spectrometer at the NPL and turned it into one of the world's top ESR and NMR Laboratories, testing theories and models. He was the first to successfully test the predictions of the underlying theory of Peter Debye, the Dutch-American theoretical physicist who received the Nobel Prize for Chemistry in 1936 for his work on molecular structure, the theory of dipole moments in liquids and the diffraction of X-rays and electrons in gases. He was not known as self promotional, and when on arrival at Newcastle Chemistry Professor Clemo suggested people were saying he 'shouldn't have come' he merely raised his eyebrows and nodded slightly in apparent agreement. He was seen as exceptionally effective and a memorial lecture is held in his name.
