= External inhibition =

External inhibition is the observed decrease of the response of a conditioned reaction when an external (distracting) stimulus that was not part of the original conditioned response set is introduced. This effect was first observed in Ivan Pavlov's classical conditioning studies where the dogs would salivate less (conditioned response) when presented with the sound of the tuning fork (conditioned stimulus) in the distracting context of a passing truck (external stimulus). External inhibition is important for its main principle in classical conditioning where a conditioned response may decrease in magnitude after the external stimulus is introduced. This is especially advantageous for when trying to disassociate conditioned stimulus and responses. A practical example is where students who become anxious (conditioned response) upon standing in front of the class to give a presentation (conditioned stimulus) may feel less anxiety if their friends were sitting in front of the student presenting (external stimulus). The positive association of speaking to friends may distract the student from associating speaking to the entire class with anxiety.

== Extent of external inhibition ==
The extent of external inhibition depends on several factors, including:

- The intensity of the external stimulus – the stronger the external stimulus, the greater the inhibition of the conditioned response.
- The amount of time it takes to notice the external stimulus – the shorter the time it takes for the subject to perceive the external stimulus, the stronger the effect will be on disrupting the conditioned response.
- Strict control of the learning environment – the presence of a distracting stimulus will lead to greater external inhibition when learning has occurred under tightly controlled conditions than when learning conditions are more variable.

== External inhibition in relation to disinhibition ==
This same external stimulus can also lead to an increased response of a conditioned reaction, called disinhibition, when introduced after experimental extinction (when the conditioned response process is independent of the conditioned stimulus). During extinction, the subject has been unconditioned as to not show the conditioned response when presented by the paired conditioned stimulus. An example of disinhibition is where a rat that was conditioned to walk from point A to point B at the sound of the buzzer and then unconditioned, and introduced with a different stimulus, such as a blinking light, will again exhibit the conditioned reaction of walking to point B. The observed response of walking to point B after a blinking light stimulus will be relatively greater compared to the rat’s movement during the unconditioned phase (when the rat was not presented with either the buzzer or blinking light).

== Experimental studies ==
=== "External Inhibition and Disinhibition Produced by Duplicate Stimuli", Wenger (1936) ===
Wenger's 1936 study examined if the same external stimulus can be used to demonstrate both external inhibition and disinhibition and the relationship of the external stimulus to the intensity of external inhibition and disinhibition. Wenger conditioned participants with electro-dermal response (raising the foot to avoid the shock) to a red light using repeating presentations of a red light paired with a shock to the right foot. After the participants were conditioned, the extra stimulus of a tactual vibration to the left hand was introduced before the red light was shown in the absence of a shock stimulus. Following the principles of external inhibition, Wenger hypothesized that the after-effect of the tactual vibration would inhibit the conditioned response to the red light and lead to smaller movements of the foot to the red light. Disinhibition was tested after experimental extinction, where the red light was presented multiple times without any shock reinforcement. Following the principles of disinhibition, Wenger hypothesized that the tactual vibration will induce a greater reaction to the light stimuli when compared to the reactions from the external inhibition test. Both of Wenger's hypotheses were confirmed; Wenger observed that both external inhibition and disinhibition could be produced by the same external stimulus (tactual vibration). In addition, higher intensity of the external stimulus produced greater magnitudes of external inhibition and disinhibition however the functional strengths of externally inhibited and disinhibited responses were not considered decisive.

=== "External Inhibition and Disinhibition in a Conditioned Operant Response", Gagne (1941) ===
The 1941 study by Gagné attempted to identify the effect of two different external stimuli (buzzer, and scratching on the back of the starting box) on rats, while applied during acquisition and extinction, to identify the effect on the strength of the conditioned operant response. Five groups of rats were used, however the differences in the latent period were hypothesized to be observed in the following conditions if it existed in comparison to a control group that did not introduce any external stimuli, 1) buzzer on the first trial of acquisition, 2) scratch on the first trial of acquisition, 3) buzzer on the fourth trial of acquisition, 4) scratch on the fourth trial of acquisition, 5) buzzer on the fifth trial of extinction, and 6) scratch on the fifth trial of extinction. For each experimental procedure, the buzzer was sounded for four seconds and stopped for two seconds before the beginning of the next trial; the scratching continued until the rat turned around to face the back of the starting box. The buzzer can be interpreted to explain Pavlov's observations on external inhibition and disinhibition in a conditioned operant response and support B. F. Skinner's hypothesis of an "emotional effect". Skinner describes that an emotional effect is observed when a response fails to be reinforced, possibly leading to operant extinction, and also an emotional "reaction commonly spoken of as frustration or rage". Regarding the extra stimulus used, the buzzer has a "depressing effect" on all trials which decreased the response magnitude during extinction. An observed increase of response magnitude following the depression would be considered a "compensatory increase in the number of available responses". On the other hand, the buzzer can also be interpreted as an external stimulus that decreases the response magnitude (external inhibition), and produce an increased response magnitude on the next trial (disinhibition) after the effect of inhibition declines. This suggests that the buzzer weakens the conditioned response, but if it is repeatedly encountered, it serves to strengthen the conditioned response, thereby decreasing the latent period. The external scratching stimulus portrays external inhibition during acquisition (fourth trial of acquisition), and disinhibition during extinction (fifth trial of extinction). There was a significant increase in the recorded latent period (i.e., the time it took for the rat to move out of the starting box and pass a four-inch mark while walking towards the food box), and decline in the magnitude of the conditioned response since the rat took longer to reach the four inch point. The additional learned response of the rat turning to the front of the box in reaction to the scratching is an effect of external inhibition, which may have added to the latent time, but the results do not indicate what portion of the rat’s turn-around response made up the latent time. Shortened latent period on the fifth trial of extinction indicates an increased magnitude of response, and represents disinhibition, where the rat is not responding to the extra stimulus as much and increases the magnitude of the conditioned response (faster latent time).

=== "External Inhibition of the Conditioned Eyelid Reflex", Pennypacker (1964) ===
In a study by Pennypacker (1964), a conditioned stimulus of a circular red light, an unconditioned stimulus of a puff of dry compressed air, and an external stimulus of a 1,000-cps tone were used to investigate external inhibition at the human level during different introduction intervals. Reflexive blinking was measured as the conditioned and unconditioned response. Each participant was first presented with two trials of the circular red light without reinforcement, and three trials of the puff of dry compressed air alone. Depending on the group, participants were presented with either 15, 30, or 60 paired conditioned stimulus – unconditioned stimulus (CS-UCS) trials, a round of an external stimulus, another 15, 30, or 60 trials of CS-UCS trials, another round of an external stimulus, and then 5 CS-UCS trials. Pennypacker suggested that following the introduction of any novel stimuli, a period of excitation occurs between the conditioned stimulus (red light) and its conditioned response (blinking), called an induction period. Thus, if the external stimulus was presented earlier in the acquisition phase, the observed decline in blinking would be even less than if the external stimulus was presented later. Pennypacker also suggested that it may be possible that an external stimulus that was introduced too late to affect the conditioned stimulus may externally inhibit the unconditioned stimulus. However, the study failed to confirm the presence of induction immediately after the tone (external stimulus) was introduced, and there was no evidence that external stimulus had any effect on reflexive blinking when presented halfway through the interval, aside from isolated cases. He suggests that the difference between the induction effect observed in a preliminary study and the current study are due to the use of visual external stimulus during a preliminary study and presenting the external stimulus instead of the conditioned stimulus; compared to the use of an auditory external stimulus and presentation of the tone in addition to the conditioned stimulus. Another suggestion is that the external stimulus was not intense enough to produce an inductive effect. Through this study, Pennypacker confirmed the observation of external inhibition on the human level. External inhibition was especially observed when the tone (external stimulus) was introduced during the acquisition phase, which was the interval right after the paired CS-UCS trials. The conditioned response, blinking reflex, was observed to be in decline (inhibited) compared to the rate during conditioning.
