= Henry Lloyd Snape =

British chemist (1861-1933)

Henry Lloyd Snape OBE FIC
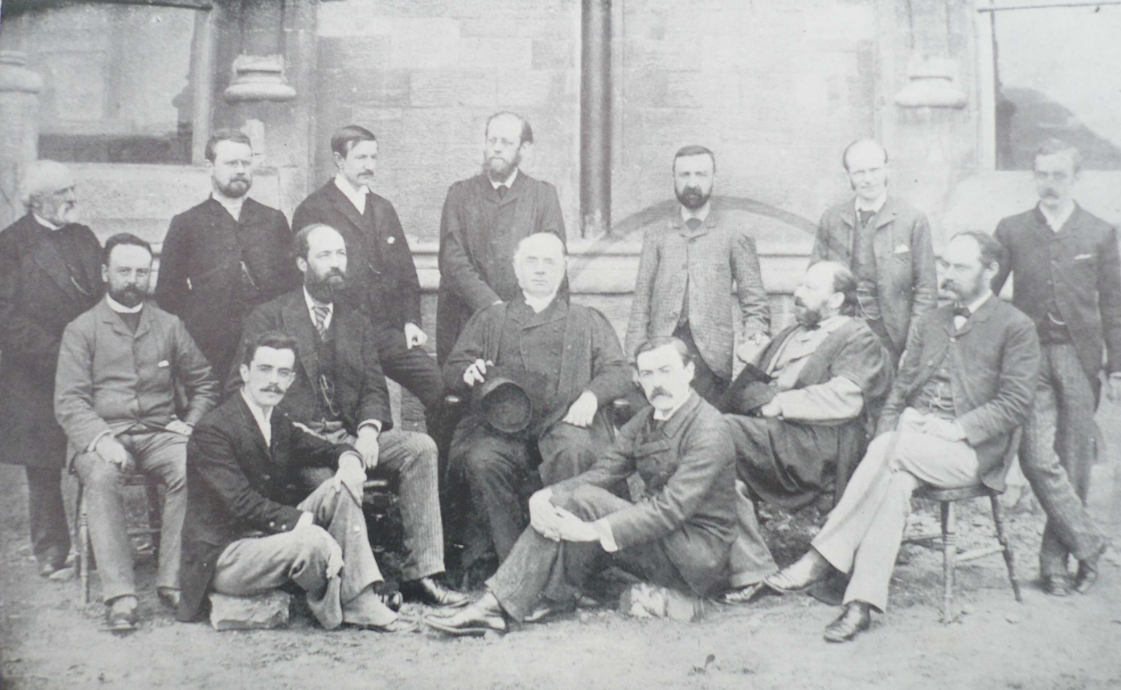
- Staff of Aberystwyth c. 1891. Snape is seated on the ground at the left
- Born: 20 April 1861; Liverpool
- Died: 2 March 1933 (aged 71); Torquay
- Education: Liverpool Institute High School for Boys
- Alma mater: University of London (BSc, DSc); University of Göttingen (PhD)
- Father: Thomas Snape
- Scientific career
- Fields: Chemistry
- Institutions: Manchester Technical School
- Thesis: Ueber die Einwirkung von Phenylcyanat auf einige Alkohole und Phenole (English: On the Effect of Phenyl Cyanate on Some Alcohols and Phenols) (1885)
- Doctoral advisors: Victor Meyer
- Other academic advisors: August Wilhelm von Hofmann
- Notable students: Frederick Daniel Chattaway; William Henry Lewis; Humphrey Owen Jones; Thomas Jones

Henry Lloyd Snape OBE FIC (20 April 1861 – 2 March 1933) was a professor of chemistry, notably at the University College of Wales, Aberystwyth. He was an influential teacher and his students included F. D. Chattaway and W. H. Lewis.

== Early life and education ==
Snape was born in Liverpool, the son of Lancashire alderman Thomas Snape (1835-1912). He had Welsh ancestry on his mother's side.

Snape was educated at Liverpool Institute followed by the School of Medicine where he studied chemistry under Campbell Brown between 1876 and 1879. He then worked at John Hutchinson and Company of Widnes and later worked as a demonstrator under Campbell Brown. He received a BSc in 1883 from London University and then went to Germany, studying under A. W. Hofmann in Berlin and Victor Meyer in Göttingen. He received a PhD in 1886 with a thesis titled Ueber die Einwirkung von Phenylcyanat auf einige Alkohole und Phenole (English: On the Effect of Phenyl Cyanate on Some Alcohols and Phenols).

== Career ==
He became a lecturer in chemistry at Manchester Technical School after returning to England and in 1888 he moved to Aberystwyth as chair of chemistry at the University College of Wales to replace Professor Thomas Samuel Humpidge. He helped create the chemistry syllabus of the University of Wales when it was established. He also worked as county chemical analyst for Cardiganshire. He published several research papers on the aromatic cyanates, carbamates and on magnesium nitride as a reagent. As a teacher he favoured a theoretical approach rather than practical or experimental aspects. One student was Thomas Jones who stated that:

The Professor of Chemistry was a full-fledged Doctor of Science and a man of great liveliness and energy. Every limb of his body was summoned to assist him in the act of lecturing … Not one of us ever touched or handled a liquid or a solid, ever bruised or pounded anything in a mortar, ever measured or analysed a mixture in a test tube.

In 1901 he became director of education for Lancashire county and retired in 1918 to Torquay. Ill health reduced his work in chemistry but he participated in educational and church committees. He worked as a Wesleyan preacher and wrote on systematic and proportionate giving. He was appointed as Officer of the Order of the British Empire (OBE) in 1921 for his work in training disabled servicemen.
