= William Henry Lewis (chemist) =

University professor (1869–1963)

William Henry Lewis FRIC
- Born: 17 May 1869; Oystermouth, Glamorgan, Wales
- Died: 25 May 1963 (aged 94); Sidmouth, Devon, England
- Education: University College of Wales, Aberystwyth; Jesus College, Oxford
- Scientific career
- Fields: Chemistry
- Workplaces: Exeter School; University College of the South West of England
- Academic advisors: Henry Lloyd Snape
- Notable students: George Roger Clemo

William Henry Lewis FRIC (17 May 1869 – 25 May 1963) was a British chemist, known for being Professor of Chemistry and Vice-principal at the University of Exeter in its early days. He was dubbed "one of the founding fathers" of the university in his obituary in the journal Nature.

== Early life and education ==
Lewis was born on 17 May 1869 in Oystermouth, part of the Welsh historic county Glamorgan. He was educated at University College of Wales, Aberystwyth (as it was then known), where he was a student of Henry Lloyd Snape. In 1890, he matriculated at Jesus College, Oxford, where he was a scholar and where he also worked as a lecture assistant of the Chemistry Research Laboratory. Lewis graduated from Oxford with a Bachelor of Arts degree in Natural Science.

== Career ==
After graduating from Oxford, Lewis was a science master at Exeter School from 1894 to 1901, before being appointed Professor of Chemistry at the Royal Albert Memorial College (later University College of the South West of England, predecessor of the present day University of Exeter). He was one of four heads of department appointed at the college at the time. Among Lewis's students at the college was George Roger Clemo, who was greatly influenced by Lewis and went on to become a successful organic chemist.

From 1925 until his retirement in 1935, he combined his position as Professor with that of Vice-Principal of the College, helping to publicise the institution throughout Devon. In his role as Professor, he was regarded as having built up the chemistry department from nothing into a "strong and vital unit." He was responsible for the planning of the Washington Singer Building, which opened in 1931 for new chemical laboratories. The building still stands and houses the university's psychology department.

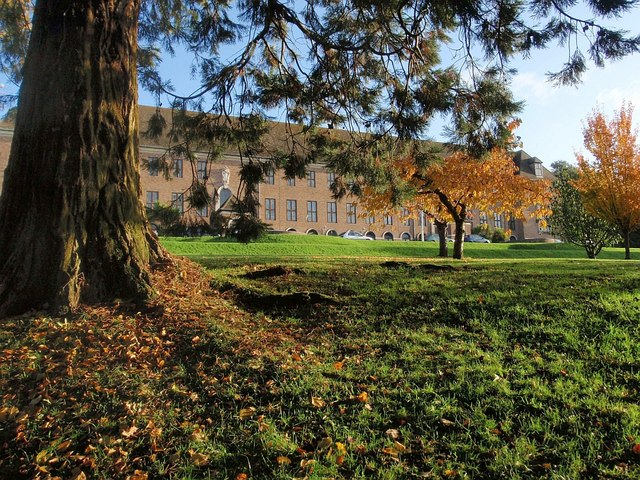
The Washington Singer Building was opened in 1931 as chemical laboratories, during Lewis's tenure as head of Chemistry at Exeter.

Lewis was an active member of the scientific community. He was elected as fellow of the Chemical Society in 1894, with his candidacy endorsed by his former lecturer Henry Lloyd Snape as well as former classmate and collaborator Frederick Daniel Chattaway. He also served on the council of the Royal Institute of Chemistry from 1924 to 1927. In 1928, he was elected to the committee of the Bristol and South-Western Counties branch of the institiute. Lewis was also the local representative of the Chemical Society in Exeter from 1932 to 1936. Later in his scientific career, one of Lewis's areas of interest was river pollution. He was credited in Aubrey Strahan's report to the Royal Geographical Society in 1908 for supporting the research of impurities in the River Exe.

Lewis was credited with having an instrumental role in establishing the Committee for the Furtherance of University Education in the South-West with his Exeter colleagues, Professors Walter J. Harte (1866-1954) and Arthur Eustace Morgan (1886-1972). Lewis also served as honorary secretary of this committee, which was active during World War I and eventually succeeded in the establishment of University College of the South West, which in turn became University of Exeter.

Lewis was made Professor Emeritus on his retirement in 1935 and awarded an honorary LLD by Exeter University in 1957, after the institution had received royal charter in 1955.

== Personal life and death ==
Lewis was a close friend of Frederick Daniel Chattaway, who was one of his fellow chemistry students at Aberystwyth and Oxford. Chattaway and Lewis also collaborated on many research papers during their careers.

He died on 25 May 1963 in Sidmouth, Devon, aged 94.

== Selected publications ==
- Chattaway, F. D.; Lewis, W. H. (1894). "LXVIII.—Phenylnaphthalenes. II. β-Phenylnaphthalene". J. Chem. Soc. 65: 869–875. doi:10.1039/ct8946500869. ISSN 0368-1645.
- Chattaway, Frederick Daniel; Lewis, William Henry (1904). "LVII.—Isomeric change of diacylanilides into acylaminoketones. Transformation of the dibenzoyltoluidines into the isomeric benzoylaminomethyl-benzophenones". J. Chem. Soc. 85: 589–596. doi:10.1039/ct9048500589. ISSN 0368-1645.
- Chattaway, Frederick Daniel; Lewis, William Henry (1904). "CLXVI.—Isomeric change of diacylanilides into acylaminoketones. Transformation of dibenzoylaminobenzophenone into 1-benzoylamino-2 : 4-dibenzoylbenzene". J. Chem. Soc. 85: 1663–1665. doi:10.1039/ct9048501663. ISSN 0368-1645.
- Chattaway, Frederick Daniel; Lewis, William Henry (1905). "XCIX.—The action of hypobromous acid on piperazine". J. Chem. Soc. 87: 951–955. doi:10.1039/ct9058700951. ISSN 0368-1645.
- Chattaway, Frederick Daniel; Lewis, William Henry (1906). "XIX.—Halogen derivatives of substituted oxamides". J. Chem. Soc. 89: 155–161. doi:10.1039/ct9068900155. ISSN 0368-1645.
- Orton, J. H.; Lewis, W. H. (1924). "A Plea for Continuous Fundamental Research on the Problems of River Pollution". Nature. 113 (2833): 236–237. doi:10.1038/113236a0. ISSN 0028-0836.
