= Transmarginal inhibition =

In psychology, transmarginal inhibition, or TMI, is an organism's response to overwhelming stimuli.

== Research ==
Ivan Pavlov enumerated details of TMI on his work of conditioning animals to pain. He found that organisms had different levels of tolerance. He commented "that the most basic inherited difference among people was how soon they reached this shutdown point and that the quick-to-shut-down have a fundamentally different type of nervous system."

Patients who have reached this shutdown point often become socially dysfunctional or develop one of several personality disorders. Often patients who dissociate during and after the experience, will more easily dissociate or shut down during stressful or painful experiences, and may experience post traumatic stress disorder for the remainder of their lives.

== Stages ==
There are three stages passed through for state of TMI to be reached.

1. equivalent phase: when the response matches the stimuli, which is considered the normal baseline behavior.
2. paradoxical phase: associated with quantity reversal, occurs when small stimuli receive major responses and major stimuli elicit small responses.
3. ultra-paradoxical: the final stage, associated with quality reversal in which negative stimulation results in positive responses and vice versa.

Additional research on these phases was done by William Sargant in his work on shell-shocked servicemen.

An organism can progress through these stages by increased stimulation, random negative stimulation, reversing positive and negative stimulation, or physically debilitating the organism.

As observed by Pavlov, tolerance of stimulation varies greatly between individuals. Highly sensitive persons may be overstimulated by the loud volumes in a movie theater or the background confusion of a large social gathering. Other individuals will find those same stimulations as ideal stimulation levels, or even understimulating.

== Use in mental conditioning ==
The sudden conversion methods of mental conditioning rely heavily on TMI. Of the ten elements of control (environment control, physical fatigue, mental fatigue, tension or uncertainty, confession, superstimulation, crisis, euphoria, proselytization, and restimulation), six can be seen as stimulation toward TMI.
