= George Roger Clemo =

English organic chemist (1889-1983)

George Roger Clemo FRS FCS
- Born: 2 August 1889; Slapton, Devon, England
- Died: 2 March 1983 (aged 93)
- Education: Royal Albert Memorial College; Queen's College, Oxford; University of London
- Spouse: Angela Mary Gertrude Evans (m. 1921; died 1967)
- Children: 3 sons, 1 daughter
- Scientific career
- Fields: Organic chemistry
- Workplaces: British Dyestuffs Corporation; University of Newcastle
- Doctoral advisors: William Henry Perkin Jr.
- Other academic advisors: William Henry Lewis; Frederick Daniel Chattaway
- Notable students: Kenneth Henderson Jack

George Roger Clemo FRS (2 August 1889 – 2 March 1983) was a British organic chemist.

He was born in Slapton, Devon, the eldest son of farmer George and Blanche Ellen (née Hyne) Clemo. He attended Kingsbridge Grammar School and went on to study science at the Royal Albert Memorial College Exeter, a forerunner of Exeter University, gaining a Bachelor of Science in 1910. He then commenced training to be a teacher and in 1911 was appointed deputy master at Penzance County School. In 1916, as part of the war effort, he joined the laboratory of William Henry Perkin, Jr. to work on dyestuffs. In 1922 he entered Queen's College, Oxford and gained an Oxford B.Sc. and DPhil, the latter under the supervision of William Henry Perkin, Jr.

In 1925 he accepted the position of Director of Research at the British Dyestuffs Corporation in Manchester. In the same year, he was appointed Professor of Organic Chemistry at Armstrong College, later part of University of Newcastle. He was promoted to head of the Chemistry Department in 1932, and remain at the college until his retirement in 1954.

He was elected a Fellow of the Royal Society in 1937. His candidacy citation read: "Distinguished as an organic chemist. Author or joint-author of about 45 scientific memoirs published in the Journal of the Chemical Society. These cover a wide range of topics, of which the more significant are new synthetic methods, especially in the quinoline group; strychnine and brucine; the lupin alkaloids; the constitution of santonin; catalytic production of polynuclear compounds; experiments on hexadeuterobenzene. Made outstanding contributions to chemistry of lupinane, encountering for the first time cis and transfused rings in isomeric octahydropyrrocolines. Noteworthy too are his synthetical studies in the decaline group, and on rearrangements in the course of selenium dehydrogenations."

Clemo was a keen rugby player and represented Cornwall twice in 1913. He married Angela Mary Gertrude Evans in 1921; they had three sons and a daughter.
