= Chataway =

Chataway is a surname, and may refer to:

- Christopher Chataway (1931–2014) British runner and politician
- Gertrude Chataway (1866–1951), friend of the author Lewis Carroll
- James Chataway (1852–1901), Australian politician
- John Chataway (1947–2004), Canadian politician
- Thomas Drinkwater Chataway (1864–1925), Australian politician, brother of Gertrude and James

== See also ==
- Chattaway
