= List of fellows of the Royal Society elected in 1907 =

This is a list of fellows of the Royal Society elected in 1907.

== Fellows ==
- Frank Dawson Adams (1859–1942)
- Sir Hugh Kerr Anderson (1865–1928)
- Sir William Blaxland Benham (1860–1950)
- Sir William Henry Bragg (1862–1942)
- Archibald Campbell Campbell, 1st Baron Blythswood (1835–1908)
- Frederick Daniel Chattaway (1860–1944)
- Arthur William Crossley (1869–1927)
- Arthur Robertson Cushny (1866–1926)
- William Duddell (1872–1917)
- Frederick William Gamble (1869–1926)
- Sir Joseph Ernest Petavel (1873–1936)
- Henry Cabourn Pocklington (1870–1952)
- Henry Nicholas Ridley (1855–1956)
- Sir Grafton Elliot Smith (1871–1937)
- William Henry Young (1863–1942)

== Foreign members ==
- Ivan Petrovich Pavlov (1849–1936)
- Edward Charles Pickering (1846–1919)
- Magnus Gustaf Retzius (1842–1919)
- Augusto Righi (1850–1920)
