= Edwin B. Twitmyer =

Edwin Burket Twitmyer (1873–1943) was Professor of Psychology and Director of the Psychological Laboratory and Clinic at the University of Pennsylvania. He is a little-known figure in the history of psychology, but he independently discovered classical conditioning at approximately the same time as the famous Russian physiologist, Ivan Pavlov, who is normally given credit for this achievement.

Twitmyer initially studied the patellar tendon reflex, and devised an apparatus that delivered a light tap below the knees of his research subjects in order to elicit this reflex. Twitmyer warned his subjects that the tap was about to be delivered with a bell. During the course of his research, the sound of the bell was accidentally presented to one of his subjects without the tap below the knee. In a serendipitous discovery much like Pavlov's, Twitmyer realized that the auditory stimulus was sufficient to produce the now conditioned reflexive response.

Twitmyer replicated the experiment with six more subjects and found that all of them learned to associate the bell with the hammer, and would produce the response to the sound of the bell alone. This typically took several dozen trials and the conditioned response was not only unintentional, but several of his subjects found themselves unable to prevent the response even when they attempted to do so. This finding is the first experimental demonstration of classical conditioning in a human being.

Twitmyer published this research in his doctoral dissertation in 1902, one year before Pavlov announced the results of his research with dogs at the 1903 International Medical Congress in Madrid. He also presented his work at a meeting of the American Psychological Association in 1904, presided over by William James. His paper, "Knee jerks without stimulation of the patellar tendon", was given late in the session, well past the scheduled lunch break, and drew little response from the crowd.

No one at the time realized the significance of the discovery, possibly because it did not fit in with existing work in psychology. Twitmyer faded into obscurity, but only a few years later John B. Watson had great success popularizing classical conditioning as part of the growing behaviorist movement in psychology.
