= Pavlov's typology =

Psychophysiological theory

Pavlov's typology of higher nervous activity was the first systematic approach to the psychophysiology of individual differences. Ivan Pavlov's ideas of nervous system typology came from work with his dogs and his realization of individual differences. His observations of the dogs led to the idea of excitation and inhibition in the nervous system, and Pavlov theorized that the strength of these processes in the nervous system will determine whether the subject will have a strong or weak nervous system. This theory has influenced research in the field of social psychology and personality.

== Origins ==
Pavlov was a physiologist and his ideas on typology stemmed from his research on dogs and his research on the brain. Pavlov's ideas of types were adopted from Hippocrates as it was he who came up with the idea of individual differences. Hippocrates also proposed the four temperaments in man and Pavlov wanting to honor Hippocrates by use of Hippocrates' terms for his own work. Pavlov started using observations and then used many experiments to show that there were many different distinguishing ways the nervous systems of dogs worked. Pavlov noticed the individual differences in the dogs through his research on salivary responses. He noticed there were weak and strong dogs. These groups were later divided into equilibrated and non-equilibrated, and then subdivided again into mobile and inert.

Pavlov defined types of animal nervous system in one of two ways: either in "terms of specific complexes of the properties of the nervous processes, characteristic for the given animal, or in terms of patterns of animal or human behavior." Pavlov proposed his classification of types on the differences in the properties of the nervous processes. The word type is used in two ways in the literature about higher nervous activity: either as a "characteristic pattern of animal behavior or as a complex of the basic properties of the nervous processes."

== Definition ==
Pavlov's background as a physiologist greatly influenced his psychological research. His ideas for how the nervous system works came from his research on the brain, specifically the cortex, and conditioned and unconditioned reflexes, and spurred additional research into the nervous activity that underlies such reflexes. Pavlov introduced the ideas of strength of excitation and inhibition, as well as mobility, irradiation, and generalization in the central nervous system.

Strength of excitation was considered to be the most important of the nervous system properties by Pavlov because we are often confronted by stimuli in the environment that grab our attention immediately. Excitation of the cells is simply their ability to do work, and this can either be very short-lived or extended and have varying intensities. This excitation can lead to the gain of conditioned responses, or the generalization of a conditioned response. Inhibition, on the other hand, is when a response that is already encoded is overcome or contained. Mobility is the ability of the nervous system to give one impulse priority over another. This can be done by having excitation before inhibition, or vice versa.

Pavlov looked at the balance between excitation and inhibition and determined that there were different types of nervous systems. These observations were made about dogs, but Pavlov believed that they could be generalized to humans as well. The different types of nervous systems were categorized by Pavlov into strong and weak nervous systems with different sub-types under the strong type. These different types of systems were categorized based on the strength of excitation or inhibition in the system of the observed individual. Those individuals with weak nervous systems were thought by Pavlov "to have limited adaptive abilities," while strong nervous systems were more adaptable.

Although Pavlov's typology originated as a purely conceptual idea, modern technology has helped research in the area to provide evidence for the processes of higher nervous activity that Pavlov hypothesized.

== Influence ==
Despite having been a conceptual nervous system based primarily on inferences, modern research has shown Pavlov's neuroconditioning system to be largely correct. In recent years, it has become the most functional means of correlating direct neural action and conditioned action. This has facilitated research to uncover the proper physical basis of learning.

To prevent his system from being seen as mechanistic or reductionist while, also trying to draw a basic distinction between animal and human learning, Pavlov wrote in 1927: "Of course a word is for man as much a real conditioned stimulus as are other stimuli common to men and animals, yet at the same time it is so all-comprehending that it allows no quantitative or qualitative comparisons with conditioned stimuli in animals." In 1932, Pavlov made the claim that speech is signals of signals—or second signals. These second signals are, at their core, abstractions of reality and a method of generalization that is distinctive of human higher thought. He stated, again in 1932: "In man there comes to be .. . another system of signalization, a signalization of the first system . . . a new principle of neural action is [thus] introduced". This is the Pavlov "second-signal system" principle that distinguishes verbal conditioning, or language acquisition, in man from first-signal conditioning in men and animals. This view is different from most American behaviorists, who claim language is either a mediator, operating principally according to the laws of the reactions that it mediates, or is simply a conditioned vocal reaction.

Pavlov's typology has been compared to psychologist Hans Eysenck's theory of the physiological bases of extraversion and introversion. This is principally due to Eysenck's use of the Pavlovian concepts of excitation, inhibition, and equilibrium of cortical nervous processes.
