= Thomas Samuel Humpidge =

English chemist (1852–1887)

Thomas Samuel Humpidge (23 July 1853 – 30 November 1887) was an English chemist who served as a professor at the University of Wales, Aberystwyth. He translated a German textbook of organic chemistry by Hermann Kolbe into English.

== Life and work ==
Humpidge went to Gloucester Crypt Grammar School and then worked as a clerk in a corn-merchant office and took evening classes in science. He won a silver medal as a part-time student and received one of three Jodrell Scholarships. He then went to study under Professor Edward Frankland and with Robert Bunsen in Heidelberg at the Royal School of Mines. He received his BSc in 1877. In 1883 he became an assistant to Frankland and became a professor of chemistry in 1883 at Aberystwyth. He studied coal gas while at Kensington and later the atomic weight of beryllium. He also looked at ways to analyze iron content in samples and computing the horizontal component of the earth's magnetic field. He also translated Kopp's works and Kolbe's textbook of inorganic chemistry into English. In 1885 a fire destroyed his laboratory and caused damage to his works. He also suffered from poor health and died after three weeks of suffering, leaving a wife and two children.
