= Shepard Siegel =

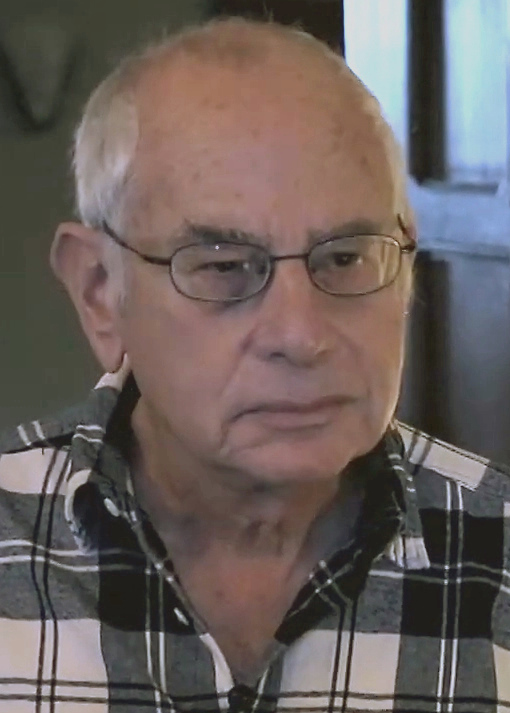
Shepard Siegel in 2014

Shepard Siegel is a Canadian psychologist, having been a Distinguished University Professor at McMaster University. He is a Fellow of the Royal Society of Canada and Society of Experimental Psychologists.
