= Differential outcomes effect =

Behavioural theory in psychology

The differential outcomes effect (DOE) is a theory in behaviorism, a branch of psychology, that shows that a positive effect on accuracy occurs in discrimination learning between different stimuli when unique rewards are paired with each individual stimulus. The DOE was first demonstrated in 1970 by Milton Trapold on an experiment with rats. Rats were trained to discriminate between a clicker and a tone by pressing the left and right levers. Half of the rats were trained using the differential outcomes procedure (DOP), where the clicker was paired with sucrose and tone with food pellets. The remaining rats were trained with only sucrose or only food pellets. The rats trained with the DOP were significantly more accurate than those trained with only one type of reinforcement (common outcome). Since then it has been established through a myriad of experiments that the DOE exists in most species capable of learning.

== Definition ==
The DOE not only states that an association between a stimulus and a response is formed as traditional classical conditioning states, but that a simultaneous association is formed between a stimulus and a reinforcer in the subject. If one were to pair a stimulus with a reinforcer, that is known as a differential condition. When this is employed, one can expect a higher accuracy in tests when discriminating between two stimuli, due to this increased amount of information available to the subject than in a non-differential condition.

== History ==
In 1970 the DOE was discovered by Trapold when testing the reasoning behind the theory. He created an experiment where rats were taught to discriminate between a clicking noise and a tone. He associated the left bar with the clicking noise and the right bar with the tone. The experimental group was given sucrose for one response and food for the other. The control group was randomly given either food or sucrose for each response. The rats in the experimental group were able to discriminate between the two stimuli faster than the rats in the control group.

The DOE was then found to exist in various species including but not limited to rats, pigeons, and horses over the years and was then finally explored in humans by Pauline Maki, J. Bruce Overmier, Sandra Delos, and Arlyne Gutmann in 1995. They tested children who were from 4 to 7 years old to discriminate between two different shapes. Children who were given either a reinforcer consisting of food for one response or given a verbal reinforcer for another response gave far more accurate answers than those who were given random reinforcers for different responses.

Then in 2002, Odette Miller, Kevin Waugh, and Karen Chambers proved that the DOE exists in adults. This experiment was novel because it first used average adults (college students) in the experiment, and had a complex discrimination task which required participants to be able to distinguish between 15 different Kanji characters. In prior experiments, participants were only required to discriminate between two different stimuli. For the participants in the group given a differential condition, each Kanji character was given a unique photo and prize for answering correctly. Participants in the group given a non-differential condition were given a random photo and prize for answering the question correctly. The group given a differential condition fared far better than those in the group with the non-differential condition, demonstrating that the DOE not only exists in adult humans but also can be applied to tasks requiring discrimination of more than two stimuli.

A meta-analysis demonstrated that the DOP has a large effect on humans, demonstrating that effect in typically developing children and healthy adults. More recently several studies have looked at the applications of the differential outcomes effect for populations with intellectual disabilities and pervasive developmental disabilities. Scientists have theorised that this procedure may be useful in overcoming barriers to learning.
