= Ernst Cohen =

Dutch chemist

Ernst Julius Cohen
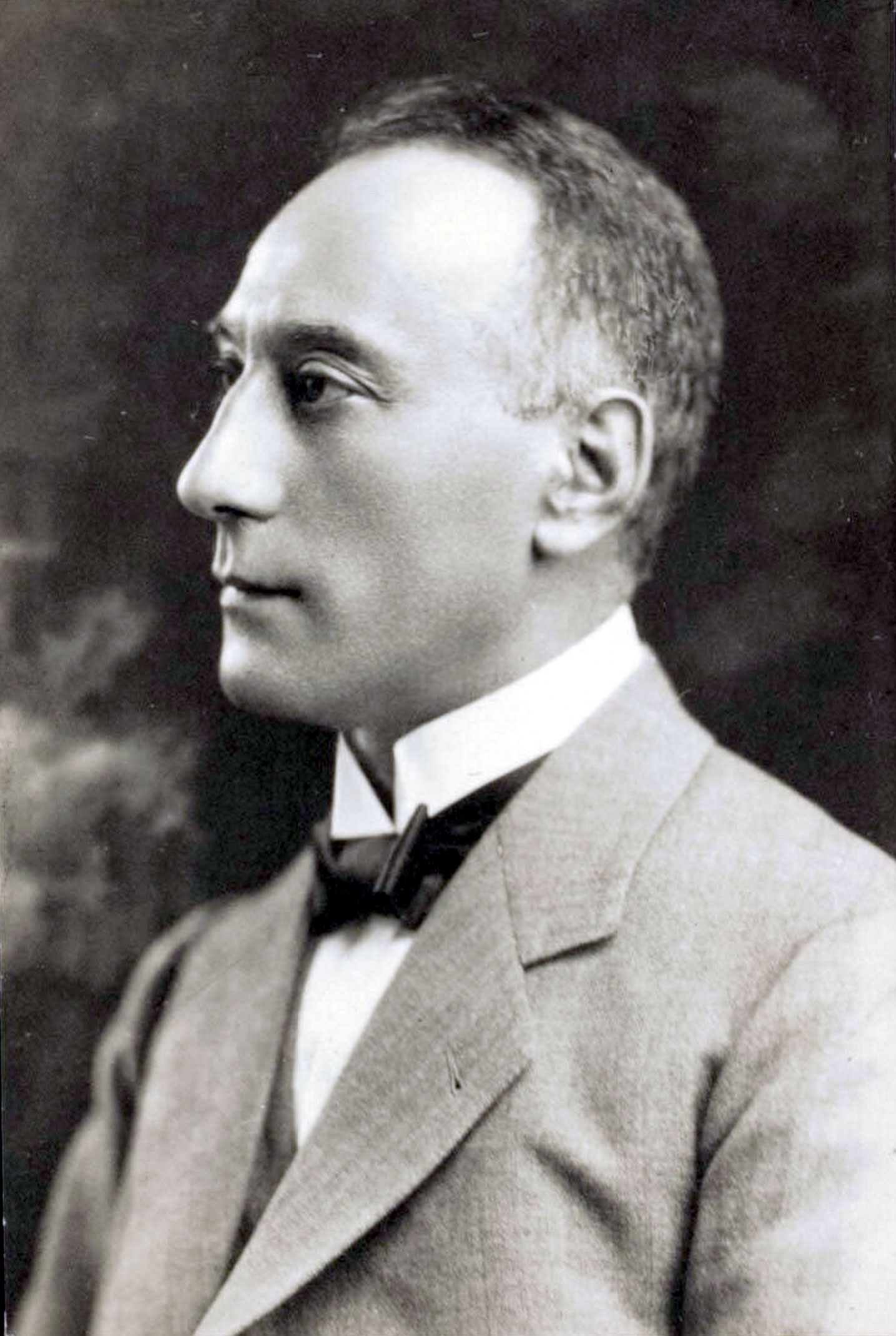
- Born: 7 March 1869; Amsterdam, Netherlands
- Died: 6 March 1944 (aged 74); Auschwitz-Birkenau, German-occupied Poland
- Scientific career
- Fields: Chemistry
- Doctoral advisor: Jacobus Henricus van 't Hoff

Ernst Julius Cohen ForMemRS (7 March 1869 – 6 March 1944) was a Dutch Jewish chemist known for his work on the allotropy of metals. Cohen studied chemistry under Svante Arrhenius in Stockholm, Henri Moissan at Paris, and Jacobus van't Hoff at Amsterdam. In 1893 he became Van't Hoff's assistant and in 1902 he became professor of Physical Chemistry at the University of Utrecht, a position which he held until his retirement in 1939. Throughout his life, Cohen studied the allotropy of tin. Cohen's areas of research included polymorphism of both elements and compounds, photographic chemistry, electrochemistry, piezochemistry, and the history of science. He published more than 400 papers and numerous books.

In 1913 he became member of the Royal Netherlands Academy of Arts and Sciences. He was elected a Foreign Member of the Royal Society in 1926. Following the 29 April 1942 decree that Dutch Jews wear the yellow badge, he was arrested by Nazi police for non-compliance and forced to resign.

According to Margit Szöllösi-Janze, in her book, Science in the Third Reich, Cohen "put great efforts into restoring the relationships of Western European scientists with their German colleagues after the First World War." He was killed on 6 March 1944 in a gas chamber at Auschwitz concentration camp.

== Literary works ==
- "J. H. van 't Hoff, his life and work", 1912
- "Impressions of the Land of Benjamin Franklin", 1928
