= Frederick Daniel Chattaway =

English organic chemist (1860-1944)

Frederick Daniel Chattaway FRS FCS FRIC
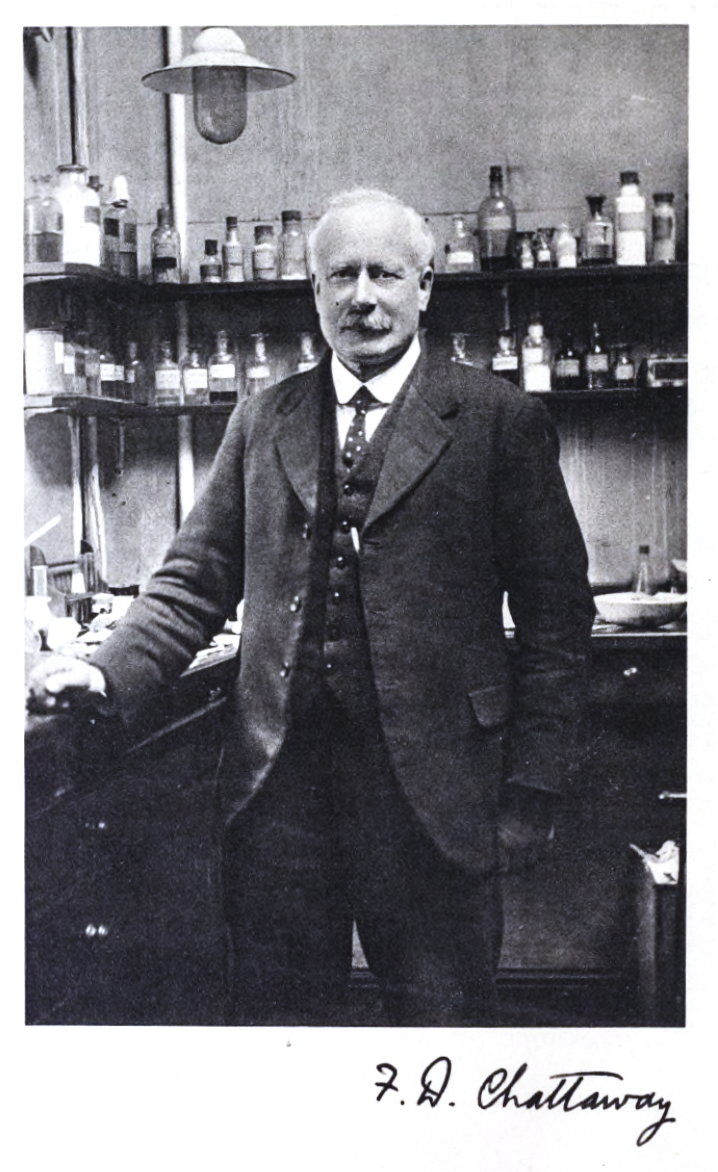
- Born: November 9, 1860; Foleshill, Warwickshire, England
- Died: January 27, 1944 (aged 83); Torquay, Devon, England
- Education: Aberystwyth University; Christ Church, Oxford; University of London; Ludwig-Maximilians-Universität München
- Spouse: Elizabeth Bettany
- Children: 2
- Scientific career
- Fields: Organic chemistry
- Workplaces: St Bartholomew's Hospital; The Queen's College, Oxford
- Doctoral advisor: Adolf von Baeyer; Eugen Bamberger
- Other academic advisors: William A. Tilden; Henry Lloyd Snape; Augustus George Vernon Harcourt

Frederick Daniel Chattaway FRS FCS FRIC (9 November 1860 – 27 January 1944) was an English organic chemist who trained in Germany. He served as a professor of chemistry at Queen's College, Oxford, where he pioneered research in organic chemistry. He was also interested in nitrogen halides, anilides, and amides.

== Life and work ==
Chattaway was born at Foleshill, Warwickshire to ribbon and trimmings manufacturer Daniel Clarke and Eliza Anne Adcock. His father's family business in Coventry collapsed after the 1870 treaty with France and Chattaway depended on scholarships for his education.

He was privately tutored by Rev. J.S. Withers, after which he went to Mason College, where he studied chemistry under Sir William Tilden. He then went to the School of Mines in London and considered studying medicine, but was unable to bear the sight of dissections. He shifted to chemistry and went to University College, Aberystwyth studying under Henry Lloyd Snape.

Two years later, Chattaway went to Christ Church, Oxford under A. G. Vernon Harcourt. He passed first class in natural sciences in 1891 and then went to Germany to work under Adolf von Baeyer and Eugen Bamberger at the Ludwig-Maximilians-Universität München. He received a PhD from the Ludwig-Maximilians-Universität München with summa cum laude in 1893. He also received a DSc from London.

He returned to work at St Bartholomew's Hospital from 1893, lecturing in chemistry under W. J. Russell, after whose retirement he served as head of chemistry. In 1905, he moved to Heidelberg to study under George Bredig, and then went to Utrecht working under Ernst Cohen.

He synthesized chloramine-T in 1905, studied reactions involving acetylation, halides and nitrogenous organic compounds. He was elected to Fellow of the Royal Society in 1907. From 1908, he worked at Queen's College Laboratory under Cecil Cronshaw, succeeding him in 1910. He conducted organic chemistry research and was the only such laboratory at Oxford until 1912. His eyesight began to fail leading to his retirement.

Chattaway married Elizabeth Bettany of Handsworth in 1894, and they had a daughter Mary Margaret (1899–1997) who became a botanist and a son who was killed in 1916 while serving with the Cheshire Regiment at Thiepval. He died at a nursing home in Torquay.
