= Bredig's arc method =

Bredig's arc method or electrical disintegration is a method of preparation of colloidal solution, of metals such as gold, silver or platinum.

This method consists of both dispersion and condensation. An arc is struck between electrodes of the desired metal, under the surface of water containing some stabilizing agent such as traces of potassium hydroxide. The intense heat of the arc vaporizes some of the metal which then condenses under cold water. The water is kept cold with an ice bath.

This method is not suitable when the dispersion medium is an organic liquid as considerable charring occurs.
