= List of fellows of the Royal Society D, E, F =

About 8,000 fellows have been elected to the Royal Society of London since its inception in 1660. Below is a list of people who are or were Fellow or Foreign Member of the Royal Society. The date of election to the fellowship follows the name. Dates in brackets relate to an award or event associated with the person. The Society maintains complete online list. This list is complete up to and including 2019.

List of fellows and foreign members of the Royal Society
A, B, C	D, E, F	G, H, I	J, K, L	M, N, O	P, Q, R	S, T, U, V	W, X, Y, Z

== List of fellows ==
=== D ===
Name	Election date	Notes
John Vivian Dacie	1967-03-16	20 July 1912 – 12 February 2005 Haemotologist, Royal Medical School, London
Henry Dagge	1779-03-11	c. 1715 –
Frederick Sydney Dainton, Baron Dainton of Hallam Moors	1957-03-21	11 November 1914 – 5 December 1997
John Bourke Dainton	2002-05-09	Physicist, Liverpool University
Henry Drysdale Dakin	1917-05-3	12 March 1880 – 10 February 1952
William Ernest Dalby	1913-05-01	21 December 1862 – 25 June 1936 engineer, Imperial College, London
Henry Hallett Dale	1914-05-07	9 June 1875 – 23 July 1968 PRS 1940–1945
Alexander Dalgarno	1972-03-16	5 January 1928 – 9 April 2015
Richard Henry Dalitz	1960-03-24	28 February 1925 – 13 January 2006
William Henry Dallinger	1880-06-03	5 July 1842 – 7 November 1909
John Charles Dalrymple-Hay	1864-06-02	12 February 1821 – 28 January 1912
Alexander Dalrymple	1771-02-14	24 July 1737 – 19 June 1808
John Dalrymple	1849-06-07	1803 – 2 May 1852
John Dalrymple	1796-05-26	– 10 October 1798
Henry Dalton	1816-06-20	fl 1816
Howard Dalton	1993-03-11	8 February 1944 – 12 January 2008
John Dalton	1822-03-07	6 September 1766 – 27 July 1844
Keith Dalziel	1975-03-20	24 August 1921 – 7 January 1994
William Cecil Dampier	1901-06-06	27 December 1867 – 11 December 1952 Physicist, formerly William Cecil Dampier Whetham
Peter Victor Danckwerts	1969-03-20	14 October 1916 – 25 October 1984
Edmund Robert Daniell	1828-06-05	– 21 March 1854
John Frederic Daniell	1814-05-05	12 March 1790 – 13 March 1845
James Frederic Danielli	1957-03-21	13 November 1911 – 22 April 1984
Henry Ellis Daniels	1980-03-20	2 October 1912 – 16 April 2000, President of the Royal Statistical Society (1980)
Joseph Danvers	1724-11-30	c. 1697 – ? 26 October 1753
Sarah Darby	2019-04-16	
James Darcy, 2nd Baron Darcy of Navan	1729-06-05	c. 1707 – 15 June 1733
James Dargent	1768-03-17	c. 1724 –
John Darker	1768-05-05	c. 1722 – 8 February 1784 MP
Cyril Dean Darlington	1941-03-20	19 December 1903 – 26 March 1981
Charles Galton Darwin	1922-05-11	19 December 1887 – 31 December 1962
Charles Robert Darwin	1839-01-24	12 February 1809 – 19 April 1882
Erasmus Darwin	1761-04-09	12 December 1731 – 18 April 1802, physician, poet, inventor (grandfather of Charles Darwin)
Francis Darwin	1882-06-08	16 August 1848 – 19 September 1925
George Howard Darwin	1879-06-12	9 July 1845 – 7 December 1912
Horace Darwin	1903-06-11	13 May 1851 – 22 September 1928
Robert Waring Darwin	1788-02-21	30 May 1766 – 13 November 1848
Lord Ara Darzi	2013-05-02	7 May 1960 –
Partha Sarathi Dasgupta	2004-05-27	17 November 1942 –
Pavel Michailovich, Prince Dashkov	1781-02-08	12 May 1763 – 1807
Francis Dashwood, 11th Baron Le Despencer	1746-06-19	December 1708 – 11 December 1781
Naomi Datta	1985-03-21	17 September 1922 – 30 November 2008
Louis Jean Marie Daubenton	1755-01-09	29 May 1716 – 1 January 1800
Charles Giles Bridle Daubeny	1822-12-19	12 February 1795 – 13 December 1867
Peter Davall	1740-10-23	– 8 January 1763
Edward Davies Davenport	1839-05-30	c. 1779 – 9 September 1847
Harold Davenport	1940-03-14	30 October 1907 – 9 June 1969
Horace Davey, Baron Davey	1895-01-24	30 August 1833 – 20 February 1907
George Davey Smith	2019-04-18	9 May 1959 –
Tannatt William Edgeworth David	1900-06-14	28 January 1858 – 28 August 1934
William David	2016-04-29	Materials Chemist
Charles Rundle Davidson	1931-05-07	28 February 1875 – 18 June 1970
James Norman Davidson	1960-03-24	5 March 1911 – 11 September 1972
John Davidson	1835-06-04	23 December 1797 – 18 December 1836
John Frank Davidson	1974-03-21	7 February 1926 – 25 December 2019
Thomas Davidson	1857-06-11	17 May 1817 – 16 December 1885
Jacques Daviel	1756-03-18	August 1696 – 30 September 1762
Alwyn George Davies	1989-03-16	13 May 1926 – 1 September 2023
Alun Davies	2011-05-19	2 August 1955 –
David Evan Naunton Davies	1984-03-15	28 October 1935 –
Donald Watts Davies	1987-03-19	7 June 1924 – 28 May 2000
Edward Brian Davies	1995-03-09	13 June 1944 –
Gideon John Davies	2010-05-20	6 July 1964 –
Griffith Davies	1831-06-16	28 December 1788 – 21 March 1855
Jonathan Davies	1789-04-02	1736 – 5 December 1809 Headmaster of Eton College
Julian Edmund Davies	1994-03-10	January 1932 – Professor of Microbiology and Immunology
Kay Elizabeth Davies	2003-05-15	1 April 1951 –
Nicholas Barry Davies	1994-03-10	1952–
Richard Davies	1738-06-08	c. 1708 – December 1761 Physician
Robert Ernest Davies	1966-03-17	17 August 1919 – 7 March 1993 Biochemist
Rodney Deane Davies	1992-03-12	8 January 1930 – 8 November 2015
Sally Claire Davies	2014-04-30	24 November 1949 –
Thomas Davies	1781-03-08	1737 – 16 March 1812
Thomas Stephens Davies	1833-04-18	1795 – 6 January 1851
Pedro Franco Davila	1776-06-06	– 1785
Benjamin Davis	2015-05-01	8 August 1970 – Organic Chemist
Hart Davis	1841-05-20	– 17 June 1854 Deputy Chairman of Excise
John Francis Davis	1822-03-28	16 July 1795 – ? 12 November 1890
Joseph Barnard Davis	1868-06-04	13 June 1801 – 19 May 1881
Richard Hart Davis	1812-04-23	c. 1767 – 19 February 1842 MP
Roger John Davis	2002-05-09	
Samuel Davis	1792-06-28	– 16 June 1819 East India Co Surveyor
Alan Davison	2000-05-11	24 March 1936 — 14 November 2015
Edmund Davy	1826-01-19	1785 – 5 November 1857
John Davy	1814-02-17	24 May 1790 – 24 January 1868
Martin Davy	1801-04-23	1763 – 18 May 1839
Humphry Davy	1803-11-17	17 December 1778 – 29 May 1829, PRS 1820-1827
Geoffrey Sharman Dawes	1971-03-18	21 January 1918 – 6 May 1996
William Rutter Dawes	1865-06-01	20 March 1799 – 15 February 1868
Alexander Philip Dawid	2018-05-09	1 February 1946 –
Henry Dawkins	1778-11-05	c. 1728 – 19 June 1814 MP
James Dawkins	1815-03-09	1760 –
James Dawkins	1755-01-23	1722 – December 1757
Marian Ellina Dawkins	2014-04-30	13 February 1945 –
Richard Clinton Dawkins	2001-05-10	26 March 1941 –
William Boyd Dawkins	1867-06-06	26 December 1837 – 15 January 1929
Henry Pleydell Dawnay, 3rd Viscount Downe	1750-12-06	8 April 1727 – 9 December 1760
Donald Andrew Dawson	2010-05-20	1937–
George Mercer Dawson	1891-06-04	3 February 1849 – 2 March 1901
Harry Medforth Dawson	1933-05-11	11 November 1875 – 11 March 1939
Rex Malcolm Chaplin Dawson	1981-03-19	
John William Dawson	1862-06-05	13 October 1820 – 19 November 1899
George Edward Day	1850-06-06	4 August 1815 – 31 January 1872
John Day	1793-06-06	c. 1738 – 14 June 1808 Advocate, India
Nicholas Edward Day	2004-05-27	24 September 1939 –
Peter Day	1986-03-20	20 August 1938 – 19 May 2020
Thomas Day	1691-11-30	c. 1656 – c. 1696 Barrister
Peter Dayan	2018-05-09	1965–
Solomon Dayrolles	1743-06-16	– March 1786
George Edward Raven Deacon	1944-03-16	21 March 1906 – 16 November 1984
William Dealtry	1811-02-28	August 1775 – 15 October 1847
Caroline Dean	2004-05-27	2 April 1957 –
Anthony Deane	1681-04-06	3 December 1633 – 11 June 1721
William Deane	1814-11-17	– 11 May 1818
Geoffrey Dearnaley	1993-03-11	
Heinrich Debus	1861-06-06	13 July 1824 – 9 November 1915 Chemistry Professor, Royal Naval College, Greenwich
Philip Ivor Dee	1941-03-20	8 April 1904 – 17 April 1983
William Alexander Deer	1962-03-15	1910 – 2009
Simon Degge	1730-05-14	1697 – c. 1765
Simon Degge	1723-05-02	c. 1694 – 8 November 1729
Conrad D'Alev a Dehn, Count Dehn	1729-11-06	1688–1753
Antoine Deidier	1723-11-14	? 1696 – 30 April 1746
Joseph Delafield	1835-04-02	– c. 1842
Jean Baptiste Joseph Delambre	1791-05-05	19 September 1749 – 19 August 1822
Edward Hussey Delaval	1759-12-06	June 1729 – 14 August 1814
John Delaval, 4th Earl of Tyrconnel	1834-01-09	16 December 1790 – ? 25 June 1853
Anne Dell	2002-05-09	11 September 1950 –
David Thomas Delpy	1999-05-13	11 August 1948 –
Kenneth George Denbigh	1965-03-18	30 May 1911 – 23 January 2004
Arthur Dendy	1908-05-07	20 January 1865 – 24 March 1925
Dixon Denham	1826-06-08	1 January 1786 – 8 May 1828
Joshua Frederick Denham	1841-05-20	c. 1801 – 26 January 1861
Henry Mangles Denham	1839-02-28	28 August 1800 – 3 July 1887
John Denham	1663-05-20	1615 – March 1669 Original, poet and Surveyor of the King's Works
Albert Denison, 1st Baron Londesborough	1850-06-13	21 October 1805 – 15 January 1860
William Thomas Denison	1838-02-22	3 May 1804 – 19 January 1871
Thomas Denman, 1st Baron Denman	1833-06-20	24 February 1779 – 22 September 1854
Charles Enrique Dent	1962-03-15	25 August 1911 – 19 September 1976
Frederick James Dent	1967-03-16	12 October 1905 – 5 October 1973
John Dent	1811-05-16	1760–1826
Derek Ashworth Denton	1999-05-13	27 May 1924 – 18 November 2022
John Douglas Denton	2000-05-11	Professor of Engineering, Cambridge University
Richard Michael Denton	1998-05-14	16 October 1941 –
Eric James Denton	1964-03-19	3 September 1923 – 2 January 2007
Thomas Dereham	1720-11-03	c. 1678 – 16 January 1739
William Derham	1703-02-03	26 November 1657 – 5 April 1735
John Theophilus Desaguliers	1714-07-29	12 March 1683 – 29 February 1744
Thomas Desaguliers	1780-02-24	5 January 1721 – 1 March 1780
Cecil Henry Desch	1923-05-03	7 September 1874 – 19 June 1958
Pierre Deslongchamps	1983-03-17	1938 –
Peter Desmaizeaux	1720-11-03	? 1672 – 11 July 1745 Born France 1666 "Man of Letters"
Denis Henry Desty	1984-03-15	21 October 1923 – 18 January 1994
David Elieser Deutsch	2008-05-16	18 May 1953 –
Samuel Devons	1955-03-17	30 September 1914 – 6 December 2006
Michael James Stewart Dewar	1960-03-24	24 September 1918 – 10 October 1997
James Dewar	1877-06-07	20 September 1842 – 27 March 1923
John Frederick Dewey	1985-03-21	22 May 1937 –
Thomas Michael Dexter	1991-03-14	15 May 1945 –
Thomas Frognall Dibdin	1821-03-22	1776 – 18 November 1847
John Edgar Dick	2014-04-30	1957–
Frank Dickens	1946-03-21	15 December 1899 – 25 June 1986 Biochemist, Courtauld Institute, London
Edmund Dickenson	1678-01-31	26 September 1624 – 3 April 1707
John Dickenson	1814-03-17	c. 1755 – 11 January 1842
George Dickie	1881-06-02	23 November 1812 – 15 July 1882
Ambrose Dickins	1722-11-01	c. 1687 – 25 August 1747 Surgeon
Anthony Dickinson	2003-05-15	1944 –
Charles Dickinson	1800-11-27	fl 1800
John Dickinson	1845-03-06	29 March 1782 – 11 January 1869
Joseph Dickinson	1854-06-01	1812 – 21 July 1865 Physician & Botanist
Thomas Dickson	1770-05-10	1726 – 1 June 1784 Physioian
Johann Adolph, Baron von Diescau	1716-04-05	– October 1767
John Francis Xavier Diffley	2005-05-26	4 March 1958 –
Kenelm Digby	1663-04-22	11 July 1603 – 11 June 1665 Original
Joannes Jacobus Dillenius	1724-06-25	1687 – 2 April 1747
Lewis Weston Dillwyn	1804-02-02	21 August 1778 – 31 August 1855
Nathaniel Dimsdale	1805-11-21	11 April 1748 – 3 July 1811 MP
Thomas Dimsdale	1769-03-16	? 6 May 1712 – 30 December 1800
William Henry Dines	1905-05-11	5 August 1855 – 24 December 1927
Robert Dingley	1748-11-03	? September 1710 – ? 9 August 1781
John Diodate	1724-11-30	26 October 1690 – 23 May 1727
Achille Pierre Dionis du Sejour	1775-06-01	11 January 1734 – 22 August 1794
Paul Adrien Maurice Dirac	1930-05-15	8 August 1902 – 20 October 1984
Alexander Dirom	1794-07-10	– 6 October 1830
John Disney	1832-06-09	29 May 1779 – 6 May 1857
Benjamin Disraeli, 1st Earl of Beaconsfield	1876-02-10	21 December 1804 – 19 April 1881, politician
Robert William Ditchburn	1962-03-15	14 January 1903 – 8 April 1987
William Dittmar	1882-06-08	? 14 April 1833 – ? 9 March 1892 German chemist
Edward Divers	1885-06-04	27 November 1837 – 8 April 1912
Frederick Augustus Dixey	1910-05-05	9 December 1855 – 16 January 1935
Frank Dixey	1958-03-20	7 April 1892 – 1 November 1982
Graham Dixon-Lewis	1995-03-09	1 July 1922 – 5 August 2010 Prof of Engineering, Leeds
Abraham Dixon	1749-02-09	March 1724 – 1782
Alfred Cardew Dixon	1904-05-05	22 May 1865 – 4 May 1936
Arthur Lee Dixon	1912-05-02	27 November 1867 – 20 February 1955
Gordon Henry Dixon	1978-03-16	25 March 1930 – 24 July 2016
Harold Baily Dixon	1886-06-04	11 August 1852 – 18 September 1930
Henry Horatio Dixon	1908-05-07	19 May 1869 – 20 December 1953
Jeremiah Dixon	1773-11-18	1726 – 7 June 1782, astronomer
Malcolm Dixon	1942-03-19	18 April 1899 – 7 December 1985
Raymond Alan Dixon	1999-05-13	1 December 1947 –
Richard Dixon	2018-05-09	
Richard Dixon	1811-03-21	c. 1780 – 13 May 1858 Clergyman
Richard Newland Dixon	1986-03-20	25 December 1930 –
Walter Ernest Dixon	1911-05-04	2 June 1871 – 16 August 1931
William Dixon	1730-02-26	1703 – 2 April 1783
James Johnston Dobbie	1904-05-05	4 August 1852 – 19 June 1924
Cecil Clifford Dobell	1918-05-02	23 February 1886 – 23 December 1949 Protozoologist
Christopher Martin Dobson	1996-03-14	8 October 1949 – 8 September 2019
George Edward Dobson	1883-06-07	4 September 1848 – 26 November 1895
Gordon Miller Bourne Dobson	1927-05-12	26 February 1889 – 11 March 1976
Matthew Dobson	1778-02-12	– 25 July 1784
Richard Dobson	1835-06-04	c. 1773 – 1 September 1847 Surgeon, Greenwich Naval Hospital
John Dobyns	1724-03-12	– 3 January 1731
Graham John Dockray	2004-05-27	1946 –
Pierce Dod	1730-02-26	1683 – 6 August 1754
James Munro Dodd	1975-03-20	26 May 1915 – 15 December 1986
Edward Charles Dodds	1942-03-19	13 October 1899 – 16 December 1973
Charles Dodgson	1762-04-01	c. 1723 – ? 21 January 1795 Bishop of Elphin (C.of I.)
Eleanor Joy Dodson	2003-05-15	
George Guy Dodson	1994-03-10	13 January 1937 – 24 December 2012
James Dodson	1755-01-16	– 23 November 1757
Peter Charles Doherty	1987-03-19	15 October 1940 –
Joannes Dolaeus	1692-01-21	7 September 1651 – 12 September 1707 German Physician
Liam Dolan	2014-04-30	
Raymond Joseph Dolan	2010-05-20	21 January 1954 –
John Dolben	1665-03-29	20 March 1625 – c. 15 April 1686
William Richard Shaboe Doll	1966-03-17	28 October 1912 – 24 July 2005
George Dollond	1819-12-23	25 January 1774 – 13 May 1852
John Dollond	1761-05-28	10 June 1706 – 30 November 1761
Annette Dolphin	2015-05-01	1951– Professor of Pharmacology
David Henry Dolphin	2002-05-09	15 January 1940 –
Cyril Domb	1977-03-17	9 December 1920 – 15 February 2012 Physicist
Georg Peter Domcke	1734-11-07	1734
Athene Margaret Donald	1999-05-13	15 May 1953 –
Simon Kirwan Donaldson	1986-03-20	20 August 1957 –
Vitaliano Donati	1757-05-19	1717–1762
Leonard Doncaster	1915-05-06	31 December 1877 – 28 May 1920
Bryan Donkin	1838-01-18	22 March 1768 – 27 February 1855
Rufane Shaw Donkin	1826-02-23	? September 1772 – 1 May 1841
William Fishburn Donkin	1842-01-13	16 February 1814 – 15 November 1869
Frederick George Donnan	1911-05-04	6 September 1870 – 16 December 1956
Christl Donnelly	2016-04-29	1967 –
Peter James Donnelly	2006-05-18	15 May 1959 –
Philip Donoghue	2015-05-01	5 April 1971 –
George Thomas Doo	1851-06-05	6 January 1800 – 13 November 1886
Arthur Thomas Doodson	1933-05-11	31 March 1890 – 10 January 1968
Samuel Doody	1695-11-27	28 May 1656 – November 1706
Johann Gabriel Doppelmayr	1733-12-06	1671 – 1 December 1750
Stanley Fabes Dorey	1948-03-18	28 November 1891 – 30 August 1972
Isaac Dorislaus	1681-11-30	– September 1688 Civil Servant
Peter John Dornan	2003-05-09	1939 –
Gordon Dougan	2012-04-19	
Michele Karen Dougherty	2012-04-19	1962 –
Alexander Edgar Douglas	1970-03-19	12 April 1916 – 26 July 1981
Alexander Hamilton Douglas, 10th Duke of Hamilton	1802-05-20	5 October 1767 – 18 August 1852
Andrew Douglas	1793-03-07	1736 – 10 June 1806
Charles Douglas, 3rd Duke of Queensberry and 2nd Duke of Dover	1722-11-08	24 November 1698 – 22 October 1778
Charles Douglas	1770-05-17	– ? 17 March 1789
Claude Gordon Douglas	1922-05-11	27 February 1882 – 23 March 1963
Dunbar James Douglas, 6th Earl of Selkirk	1831-01-13	22 April 1809 – 11 April 1885
Frederick Sylvester North Douglas	1817-05-01	4 February 1791 – 21 October 1819
George Douglas	1830-01-28	– ? 1868
George Douglas	1733-03-15	– 1737 Physician
George Douglas, 16th Earl of Morton	1785-02-24	3 April 1761 – 17 July 1827
George Douglas	1692-12-14	c. 1657 – 31 July 1693
Howard Douglas	1816-01-25	23 January 1776 – 9 November 1861
James Douglas	1706-11-20	21 March 1675 – 2 April 1742
James Douglas, 14th Earl of Morton	1733-04-19	1702 – 12 October 1768 PRS 1764-1768
John Douglas	1778-06-25	14 July 1721 – 18 May 1807 Bishop of Salisbury
John Douglas	1720-11-30	– 25 June 1743 Surgeon-lithotomist
Sholto Charles Douglas, 15th Earl of Morton	1754-02-21	1732 – 25 September 1774
Stewart Ranken Douglas	1922-05-11	23 February 1871 – 20 January 1936
Sylvester Douglas, Baron Glenbervie	1795-03-05	24 May 1743 – 2 May 1823
Thomas Douglas, 5th Earl of Selkirk	1808-07-07	20 June 1771 – 8 April 1820
Walter Douglas	1711-11-30	1670 – 1739 Governor, Leeward Islands
William Douglas	1800-12-18	? 1768 – ? 19 March 1819 Clergyman
William Robert Keith Douglas	1826-03-09	1783 – 5 December 1859
William Wilton Douglas	1983-03-17	15 August 1922 – 2 July 1998
James Nicholas Douglass	1887-06-09	16 October 1826 – 19 June 1898
John Derek Dowell	1986-03-20	6 January 1935 –
Ann Patricia Dowling	2003-05-15	15 July 1952 –
Patrick Joseph Dowling	1996-03-14	1939 –
John Downes	1667-12-05	c. 1627 – c. 1694
Allan Watt Downie	1955-03-17	5 September 1901 – 26 January 1988
Arthur Matthew Weld Downing	1896-06-04	13 April 1850 – 8 December 1917
Diarmuid Downs	1985-03-21	23 April 1922 – 12 February 2014
Julian Downward	2005-05-26	25 October 1960
Duncan Dowson	1987-03-19	31 August 1928 – 6 January 2020
Francis Drake	1736-06-10	January 1696 – 16 March 1771
James Drake	1701-12-01	1667 – 2 March 1707 Physician
Henri Francois Le Dran	1745-01-10	13 October 1685 – 17 October 1770
Richard Drew	1839-02-28	1787 – 14 July 1843 Trinity House
Christopher William de Dreyer	1783-06-05	– 1810
Georges Dreyer	1921-05-12	4 July 1873 – 17 August 1934
George William Drory	1836-02-04	10 January 1803 – 19 July 1879
George Claridge Druce	1927-05-12	23 May 1850 – 29 February 1932
Daniel J. Drucker	2015-05-01	23 June 1956 – Professor of Medicine
Henry Drummond	1839-12-19	5 December 1786 – 20 February 1860
Jack Cecil Drummond	1944-03-16	12 January 1891 – 5 August 1952
William Drummond	1799-04-04	c. 1770 – 29 March 1828
Henry Joseph Thomas Drury	1818-02-26	27 April 1778 – 5 March 1841 Schoolteacher, Harrow
Alan Nigel Drury	1937-05-06	3 November 1889 – 2 August 1980
Thomas Drury	1758-11-16	1712 – 19 January 1759 Baronet, MP
Henry Dry	1730-04-30	fl 1697 – 1740
John Dryden	1663-05-20	9 August 1631 – 1 May 1700 Original
Marcus du Sautoy	2016-04-29	26 August 1965 –
Matthew Duane	1763-06-09	1707–1785
Anthony Le Duc	1723-03-21	fl 1723
Andrew Coltée Ducarel	1762-02-04	1713 – 29 May 1785
Sir George Duckett	1808-12-08	17 July 1777 – 15 June 1856
Charles Dineau Duclos	1764-01-12	12 February 1704 – 26 March 1772
William Duddell	1907-05-02	1 July 1872 – 4 November 1917
Harold Ward Dudley	1930-05-15	30 October 1887 – 3 October 1935
Paul Dudley	1721-11-02	3 September 1675 – 25 January 1751
Matthew Dudley	1703-11-30	– 13 April 1721
Sheldon Francis Dudley	1941-03-20	16 August 1884 – 6 May 1956
James Duff, 2nd Earl Fife	1787-03-29	29 September 1729 – 24 January 1809
Michael James Duff	2009-05-15	28 January 1949 –
William Dugood	1728-05-02	fl 1728 – 1757
Henri Louis Duhamel du Monceau	1735-01-23	1700 – 23 August 1782
William Stewart Duke-Elder	1960-03-24	22 April 1898 – 27 March 1978
Rinaldo Duliolo	1712-10-23	– ? 1743
Daniel Dumaresq	1761-02-05	? June 1712 – 28 October 1805
Vital de Dumas	1665-06-28	fl 1665 – 1675
Thomas Dummer	1773-05-27	c. 1740 – 3 June 1781
Thomas Lee Dummer	1732-03-09	c. 1712 – 6 October 1765
Alexander Duncan	1798-04-19	1758–1832
James Matthews Duncan	1883-06-07	April 1826 – 1 September 1890
John Duncan	2008-05-16	16 May 1953 –
Peter Martin Duncan	1868-06-04	20 April 1821 – 28 May 1891
William Duncan	1771-11-14	c. 1715 – 1 October 1774
William Jolly Duncan	1947-03-20	26 April 1894 – 9 December 1960
Peter Duncumb	1977-03-17	26 January 1931 –
Robert Saunders Dundas, 2nd Viscount Melville	1817-05-15	14 March 1771 – 10 June 1851
Thomas Dundas	1768-05-05	1741 – 14 June 1820
Kingsley Charles Dunham	1955-03-17	2 January 1910 – 5 April 2001
Jack David Dunitz	1974-03-21	29 March 1923 – 12 September 2021
Edwin Dunkin	1876-06-01	19 August 1821 – 26 November 1898
James Dunlop	2016-04-29	Astrophysicist
Wyndham Rowland Dunstan	1893-06-01	24 May 1861 – 20 April 1949
Baldwin Francis Duppa	1867-06-06	18 February 1828 – 10 November 1872
August Dupré	1875-06-03	6 September 1835 – 15 July 1907
Josias Dupre	1779-06-03	1721 – 1 October 1780
David Durand	1729-01-16	1680 – 16 January 1763
Richard Michael Durbin	2004-05-27	1960 –
Francis Duroure	1773-11-10	c. 1715 – 24 February 1808
John Duroure	1779-05-25	c. 1751 – 28 February 1801
James R. Durrant	2017-05-05	
Hugh Francis Durrant-Whyte	2010-05-20	6 February 1961 –
Louis Dutens	1775-04-27	15 January 1730 – 23 May 1812
Peter Leslie Dutton	1990-03-15	
Francis Philip Duval	1741-04-16	– 9 July 1768
Philip Duval	1774-05-12	1732 – 14 March 1808
Fortunatus William Lilley Dwarris	1847-04-22	23 October 1786 – 20 May 1860
Raymond Allen Dwek	1998-05-14	10 November 1941 –
Edmund Dwyer	1812-04-09	c. 1774 – 24 July 1822 Clergyman
Christopher Dye	2012-04-19	15 April 1956 –
William David Dye	1928-05-10	30 December 1887 – 1932
Samuel Dyer	1760-03-06	1725 – 15 September 1772
Frank Watson Dyson	1901-06-06	8 January 1868 – 25 May 1939
Freeman John Dyson	1952-03-20	15 December 1923 – 28 February 2020
James Dyson	1968-03-21	10 December 1914 – 22 January 1990
James Dyson	2015-05-01	2 May 1947 –

=== E ===
Name	Election date	Notes
Colin Eaborn	1970-03-19	15 March 1923 – 22 February 2004
John Eames	1724-06-25	2 February 1686 – 29 June 1744
Frederick Marow Eardley-Wilmot	1863-06-04	29 May 1812 – 30 September 1877
John Eardley-Wilmot	1779-11-18	1748 – 23 June 1815 Barrister
John Eardley Eardley-Wilmot	1812-05-07	22 February 1783 – 3 February 1847
Sampson Eardley, Baron Eardley	1789-11-05	10 October 1744 – 25 December 1824
Henry Earle	1822-04-18	28 June 1789 – 18 January 1838
James Earle	1794-03-06	1755–1817
William Benson Earle	1773-03-04	1740 – 2 March 1796
William Earnshaw	2013-05-02	Biologist
Edward Hyde East	1799-04-11	9 September 1764 – 8 January 1847
Warren East	2017-05-05	born 27 October 1961
William East	1721-03-09	fl 1721 – 1734 Surgeon
Charles Lock Eastlake	1838-01-25	17 November 1793 – 24 December 1865
Edward Backhouse Eastwick	1851-06-05	13 March 1814 – 16 July 1883
Eric Eastwood	1968-03-21	12 March 1910 – 6 October 1981 electronics engineer, Marconi
Stephen Eaton	1797-04-27	1737 – 14 February 1806 Clergyman
Laurence Eaves	1997-05-15	born 13 May 1948
John Carew Eccles	1941-03-20	27 January 1903 – 2 May 1997
William Henry Eccles	1921-05-12	23 August 1875 – 29 April 1966
George Eckersall	1761-04-23	– 15 December 1770
Thomas Lydwell Eckersley	1938-03-17	27 December 1886 – 15 February 1959
Anton Georg Eckhardt	1774-06-02	1740–1810
Arthur Stanley Eddington	1914-05-07	28 December 1882 – 22 November 1944
Morton Eden, 1st Baron Henley	1800-02-06	8 July 1752 – 6 December 1830
William Eden, 1st Baron Auckland	1786-03-23	3 April 1744 – 28 May 1814
Gregory Edgecombe	2018-05-09	
George Edgcumbe, 1st Earl of Mount-Edgcumbe	1784-06-10	4 March 1721 – 4 February 1795
Richard Edgcumbe, 2nd Earl of Mount-Edgcumbe	1808-05-12	13 September 1764 – 26 September 1839
Richard Edgcumbe	1676-11-30	13 February 1640 – 3 April 1688
John Augustine Edgell	1943-03-18	20 December 1880 – 14 November 1962
Lovell Edgeworth	1822-11-14	30 June 1796 – December 1841
Richard Lovell Edgeworth	1781-07-05	31 May 1744 – 13 June 1817
Pehr Victor Edman	1974-03-21	14 April 1916 – 19 March 1977
John Marmion Edmond	1986-03-20	27 April 1943 – 10 April 2001
Neil Benjamin Edmonstone	1826-01-12	6 December 1765 – 4 May 1841
Edward Augustus, Duke of York and Albany	1760-11-27	14 March 1739 – 17 September 1767 Royal
Edward VII, King of Great Britain and Ireland	1863-02-12	9 November 1841 – 6 May 1910 Royal
Anthony William Fairbank Edwards	2015-05-01	4 October 1935– British statistician, geneticist, and evolutionary biologist
Bryan Edwards	1794-05-22	21 May 1743 – ? 16 July 1800
Charles Alfred Edwards	1930-05-15	23 March 1882 – 29 March 1960
David Olaf Edwards	1988-03-17	
Dianne Edwards	1996-03-14	born 1942
Frederick Wallace Edwards	1939-03-16	28 November 1888 – 15 November 1940
George Edwards	1757-11-10	3 April 1694 – 23 July 1773
George Robert Edwards	1968-03-21	9 July 1908 – 2 March 2003
James Edwards	1732-02-03	c. 1689 – 1744
John Hilton Edwards	1979-03-15	26 March 1928 – 11 October 2007
Peter Philip Edwards	1996-03-14	born 30 June 1949
Robert Geoffrey Edwards	1984-03-15	27 September 1925 – 10 April 2013
Samuel Frederick Edwards	1966-03-17	1 February 1928 – 7 May 2015
William Frederick Edwards	1829-02-26	6 April 1776 – 23 July 1842 Physiologist, to France
John Edye	1835-02-05	7 August 1789 – 1 March 1873
Joseph Edye	1841-01-21	1791 – 12 November 1866
Justus van Effen	1715-11-30	21 February 1684 – 18 September 1735
George Petros Efstathiou	1994-03-10	born 2 September 1955
Thomas Egan	1811-04-04	1752 – 1818 Irish Physician
Francis Henry Egerton, 8th Earl of Bridgewater	1781-11-08	11 November 1756 – 11 November 1829
George Granville Francis Egerton, 2nd Earl of Ellesmere	1860-12-06	15 June 1823 – 19 September 1862
John William Egerton, 7th Earl of Bridgewater	1808-01-28	14 April 1753 – 21 October 1823
Alfred Charles Glyn Egerton	1926-05-06	11 October 1886 – 7 September 1959
Geoffrey Eglinton	1976-03-18	1 November 1927 – 11 March 2016
Timothy Ian Eglinton	2014-04-30	
Georg Dionysius Ehret	1757-05-19	30 January 1708 – 9 September 1770
Ronald David Ekers	2005-05-26	born 18 September 1941
Artur Ekert	2016-04-29	born 19 September 1961
Roger Philip Ekins	2001-05-10	22 September 1926 – 26 July 2016
John Hugh David Eland	2006-05-18	born 6 August 1941
Henry Elderfield	2001-05-10	25 April 1943 – 19 April 2016
Daniel Douglas Eley	1964-03-19	1 October 1914 – 3 September 2015
William Elford	1790-04-29	1 August 1749 – 30 November 1837
William Joseph Elford	1950-03-16	4 January 1900 – 14 February 1952
Francis Elgar	1896-06-04	24 April 1845 – 17 January 1909
John Eliot	1895-06-13	25 May 1839 – 18 March 1908 Meteorologist, India
Francis Augustus Eliott, 2nd Baron Heathfield	1809-03-02	31 December 1750 – 26 January 1813
William Francis Eliott	1815-03-02	1792 – 3 September 1864
Queen Elizabeth II of the United Kingdom	1947-01-30	21 April 1926 – 8 September 2022 Royal
Queen Elizabeth The Queen Mother	1956-11-08	4 August 1900 – 30 March 2002 Royal
Robert Lewis John Ellery	1873-06-12	14 July 1827 – 14 January 1908
John Ellicott	1738-10-26	1706 – 1772
Charles Porter Ellington	1998-05-14	born 31 December 1952
Charles Morgan Elliot	1851-06-05	27 April 1815 – 4 August 1852 Soldier
Gilbert Elliot, 1st Earl of Minto	1802-12-23	23 April 1751 – 21 June 1814
Gilbert Elliot, 2nd Earl of Minto	1836-03-03	16 November 1782 – 31 July 1859
Harry Elliot	1973-03-15	28 June 1920 – 5 July 2009
John Elliot	1811-05-16	1765 – 29 March 1829 Brewer
John Elliot	1776-01-18	1732 – 20 September 1808 RN
George Elliot	1834-06-05	1 August 1784 – 24 June 1863
Walter Elliot	1878-06-06	16 January 1803 – 1 March 1887 Indian Civil Service
John Elliotson	1829-03-19	29 October 1791 – 29 July 1868
Charles Elliott	1835-11-26	10 December 1776 – 4 May 1856 Indian Civil Service
Charles Boileau Elliott	1832-04-05	17 February 1803 – 1 July 1875
Charles Thomas Elliott	1988-03-17	born 16 January 1939
Edwin Bailey Elliott	1891-06-04	1 June 1851 – 21 July 1937
James Philip Elliott	1980-03-20	27 July 1929 – 21 October 2008
Michael Elliott	1979-03-15	30 September 1924 – Agriculture chemist, Rothamsted
Roger James Elliott	1976-03-18	8 December 1928 – 16 April 2018 Professor of Physics, Oxford University
Tim Elliott	2017-05-05	
Thomas Renton Elliott	1913-05-01	11 October 1877 – 4 March 1961 physician & physiologist, University College
Alexander John Ellis	1864-06-02	14 June 1814 – 28 October 1890
Andrew Ellis	1663-05-20	? 1673 Original Postmaster
Charles Drummond Ellis	1929-05-02	11 August 1895 – 10 January 1980
George Ellis	1797-05-18	19 December 1753 – 10 April 1815 MP
George Francis Rayner Ellis	2007-05-17	born 11 August 1939
Henry Ellis	1811-05-30	29 November 1777 – 15 January 1869
Henry Ellis	1819-02-11	1 September 1788 – 28 September 1855 Diplomat & MP
Henry Ellis	1750-02-08	29 August 1721 – 21 January 1806
Jeff Ellis	2009-05-15	4 May 1953
John Ellis	1754-02-14	c. 1710 – 15 October 1776
John Ellis	1774-05-19	fl 1774
John Ellis	1801-03-12	? 1847
Jonathan Richard Ellis	1985-03-21	born 1 July 1946
Reginald John Ellis	1983-03-17	born 12 February 1935
Richard Salisbury Ellis	1995-03-09	born 25 May 1950 astronomer
Richard Keith Ellis	2009-05-15	born 17 November 1949
Thomas Flower Ellis	1847-04-15	5 December 1796 – 5 April 1861 Law reporter
Welbore Ellis, 1st Baron Mendip	1745-06-20	15 December 1713 – 2 February 1802
William Ellis	1893-06-01	20 February 1828 – 11 December 1916 Meteorologist and Astronomer
Anthony Ellys	1724-03-12	8 June 1690 – 16 January 1761
Peter Elmsley	1814-02-10	5 February 1773 – 8 March 1825
George Keith Elphinstone, Viscount Keith	1790-06-24	7 January 1746 – 10 March 1823
Howard Elphinstone	1832-06-09	9 June 1804 – 16 March 1893
Joseph Else	1778-05-14	– 10 March 1780 Anatomist
Yvonne Elsworth	2015-05-01	Physicist
Charles Sutherland Elton	1953-03-19	29 March 1900 – 1 May 1991
Harry Eltringham	1930-05-15	18 May 1873 – 26 November 1941
Henry John Elwes	1897-06-03	16 May 1846 – 26 November 1922
Martin Embley	2019-04-16	
Harry Julius Emeléus	1946-03-21	22 June 1903 – 2 December 1993
Thomas Emlyn	1768-11-10	– 31 July 1797
Maurice Emmet	1698-03-23	c. 1676 – c. 1720
Johann Franz Encke	1825-06-09	23 September 1791 – 26 August 1865
Charles Enderby	1841-01-14	21 November 1797 – 31 August 1876
John Edwin Enderby	1985-03-21	16 January 1931 – 3 August 2021 Professor of Physics, Bristol University
Philip Christopher England	1999-05-13	born 30 April 1951
Frank Leonard Engledow	1946-03-21	20 August 1890 – 3 July 1985
Henry Charles Englefield	1778-02-12	1752 – 21 March 1822
George Ent	1663-04-22	6 November 1604 – 13 October 1689 Original
George Ent	1677-11-08	c. 1644 – August 1679 Barrister
Charles L'Epinasse	1767-07-09	fl 1767
David Bernard Alper Epstein	2004-05-27	born 1937
Michael Anthony Epstein	1979-03-15	18 May 1921 – 6 February 2024 pathologist, virologist, vice-president of the Royal Society (1986–1991)
Arthur Erdelyi	1975-03-20	2 October 1908 – 12 December 1977
John Eric Erichsen	1876-06-01	19 July 1818 – 23 September 1896
William Erle	1860-11-22	1 October 1793 – 28 January 1880
Ernest Augustus, Duke of Cumberland and King of Hanover	1828-04-24	5 June 1771 – 18 November 1851 Royal
Ernest II, Duke of Saxe-Gotha-Altenburg	1787-06-14	30 January 1745 – 20 April 1804
Jeffery Errington	2003-05-15	
David Steuart Erskine, 11th Earl of Buchan	1765-06-27	1 June 1742 – 19 April 1829
Henry David Erskine, 10th Earl of Buchan	1734-01-10	17 April 1710 – 1 December 1767
Robert Erskine	1771-01-31	7 September 1735 – 2 October 1780
Thomas Erskine, 1st Baron Erskine	1787-02-22	10 January 1750 – 17 November 1823
William Erskine	1663-04-22	– 29 May 1685 Original Schoolmaster & Courtier
John Douglas Eshelby	1974-03-21	21 December 1916 – 10 December 1981
Louis Essen	1960-03-24	6 September 1908 – 24 August 1997
William Esson	1869-06-03	17 May 1838 – 28 August 1916
Francesco Maria d'Este, Prince of Modena	1735-11-06	2 July 1698 – 22 February 1780
Alison Etheridge	2015-05-01	27 April 1964 – Mathematician
Robert Etheridge	1871-06-08	3 December 1819 – 18 December 1903
Leonhard Euler	1747-01-22	15 April 1707 – 18 September 1783
Maurice Eustace	1668-01-09	1637 – 13 April 1703
Gerard Ian Evan	2004-05-27	born 17 August 1955
Anthony Glyn Evans	2001-05-10	4 December 1942 – 9 September 2009
Arthur John Evans	1901-06-06	8 July 1851 – 11 July 1941
Charles Arthur Lovatt Evans	1925-05-07	9 July 1884 – 29 August 1968
David Gwynne Evans	1960-03-24	6 September 1909 – 13 June 1984
Dennis Frederick Evans	1981-03-19	27 March 1928 – 6 November 1990
Frederick John Owen Evans	1862-06-05	9 March 1815 – 20 December 1885
John Evans	1864-06-02	17 November 1823 – 31 May 1908
John William Evans	1919-05-15	27 July 1857 – 16 November 1930
Lewis Evans	1823-05-29	1755 – 19 November 1827 Astronomer
Lloyd Thomas Evans	1976-03-18	6 August 1927 – 23 March 2015
Lyndon Rees Evans	2010-05-20	born 1945
Martin John Evans	1993-03-11	born 1 January 1941
Meredith Gwynne Evans	1947-03-20	2 December 1904 – 25 December 1952
Philip Richard Evans	2005-05-26	
Robert Evans	2005-05-26	physicist
Trevor Evans	1988-03-17	26 April 1927 – 10 October 2010 Prof of Physics, Reading
Ulick Richardson Evans	1949-03-17	31 March 1889 – 3 April 1980
William Charles Evans	1979-03-15	1 October 1911 – 24 July 1988
Arthur Stewart Eve	1917-05-03	22 November 1862 – 24 March 1948
Henry Eve	1681-11-09	– 4 March 1686
George Evelyn	1829-02-12	16 September 1791 – 15 February 1829
John Evelyn	1663-04-22	31 October 1620 – 27 February 1706 Original Fellow
John Evelyn	1723-01-17	1 March 1682 – 15 July 1763 Baronet
George Everest	1827-03-08	4 July 1790 – 1 December 1866
Douglas Hugh Everett	1980-03-20	26 December 1916 – 24 June 2002
Joseph David Everett	1879-06-12	11 September 1831 – 9 August 1904
Barry John Everitt	2007-05-17	
John Evershed	1915-05-06	27 February 1864 – 17 November 1956
Richard Peter Evershed	2010-05-20	
Paul Peter Ewald	1958-03-20	23 January 1888 – 22 August 1985
Alfred James Ewart	1922-05-11	13 February 1872 – 12 September 1937
James Cossar Ewart	1893-06-01	26 November 1851 – 31 December 1933
Warren John Ewens	2000-05-11	born 23 January 1937
Walter Ewer	1840-05-21	1784 – 5 January 1863 Bengal Civil Service
James Alfred Ewing	1887-06-09	27 March 1855 – 7 January 1935
Arthur James Ewins	1943-03-18	4 February 1882 – 24 December 1957
David John Ewins	2006-05-18	
Francis Haskins Eyles-Stiles	1743-03-10	– 26 January 1762
Brian Leonard Eyre	2001-05-10	29 November 1933 – 28 July 2014
James Eyre	1791-05-05	? September 1734 – 1 July 1799
Kingsmill Eyre	1726-05-12	23 May 1682 – 20 March 1743
Richard Eyre	1767-02-19	1767 Clergyman

=== F ===
Name	Election date	Notes
Andrew Christopher Fabian	1996-03-14	
Arthur Fage	1942-03-19	4 March 1890 – 7 November 1977
Jean Baptiste Faget	1752-12-14	1706 – 7 November 1762
Daniel Gabriel Fahrenheit	1724-05-07	? 14 May 1686 – 16 September 1736
William Fairbairn	1850-06-06	20 February 1789 – 18 August 1874
Henry Colepeper Fairfax	1727-01-11	c. 1697 – 14 October 1734
Neil Hamilton Fairley	1942-03-19	15 July 1891 – 20 April 1966
Norman Leslie Falcon	1960-03-24	29 May 1904 – 31 May 1996 Geologist, BP
Douglas Scott Falconer	1973-03-15	10 March 1913 – 23 February 2004
Hugh Falconer	1845-02-13	29 February 1808 – 31 January 1865
William Falconer	1773-03-18	24 February 1744 – 31 August 1824 Physician, Chester & Bath
Fearon Fallows	1820-06-08	4 July 1789 – 25 July 1831
Wenfei Fan	2018-05-09	
Bernard Fanaroff	2019-04-16	1947
Francis Fane	1663-05-20	c. 1612 – 1681 Original
Michael Faraday	1824-01-08	22 September 1791 – 25 August 1867
Giuseppe de Faria	1682-11-30	– 15 September 1703
Francis James Macdonald Farley	1972-03-16	
David Malcolm Farmer	2006-05-18	Oceanographer, Rhode Island
Ernest Harold Farmer	1948-03-18	3 March 1890 – 13 April 1952 Chemist
Frank Reginald Farmer	1981-03-19	18 December 1914 – 10 June 2001
John Bretland Farmer	1900-06-14	5 April 1865 – 26 January 1944
Richard Farmer	1791-02-17	28 August 1735 – 8 September 1797
Graham Douglas Farquhar	1995-03-09	
Robert Townsend Farquhar	1820-01-20	14 October 1776 – 16 March 1830
James Farquharson	1830-01-28	1781 – 3 December 1843
Clinton Coleridge Farr	1928-05-10	22 May 1866 – 27 January 1943
Samuel Farr	1779-02-25	1741 – 11 March 1795 English physician
William Farr	1855-06-07	30 November 1807 – 14 April 1883 statistician
Francis Farr	1770-03-01	– 23 August 1809 Physician
Frederick William Farrar	1866-06-07	7 August 1831 – 22 March 1903
Jeremy Farrar	2015-05-01	1961 – Director of Wellcome Trust
Arthur Farre	1839-05-02	6 March 1811 – 17 December 1887
William Scott Farren	1945-03-22	3 April 1892 – 3 July 1970
Michael John Robert Fasham	2000-05-11	1942 – 7 June 2008 Oceanographer
Nicolas Fatio de Duillier	1688-05-02	17 February 1664 – ? 12 May 1753
Jean Christophe Fatio	1706-04-03	– October 1720
Paul Fatt	1969-03-20	
Francis Fauquier	1753-02-15	? July 1703 – 3 March 1768
William Fauquier	1747-01-29	– 1788
Edward Fawcett	1923-05-03	18 May 1867 – 22 September 1942
Henry Fawcett	1882-01-12	26 August 1833 – 6 November 1884
Jonathan Fawconer	1736-02-05	? October 1753
Charles François de Cisternay du Fay	1729-05-08	14 September 1698 – 16 July 1739
Charles de la Faye	1725-11-04	1677 – 11 December 1762 Clerk of the Signet
Joseph Fayrer	1877-06-07	6 December 1824 – ? 19 May 1907
Charles Feake	1749-01-26	c. 1716 – 2 August 1762
William George Fearnsides	1932-05-05	10 November 1879 – 15 May 1968
Douglas Thomas Fearon	1999-05-13	
William James Feast	1996-03-14	
Norman Feather	1945-03-22	16 November 1904 – 14 August 1978
George William Featherstonhaugh	1835-04-02	1780 – 27 September 1866
Nicasius le Febure	1663-05-20	c. 1610 – ? April 1669 Original
Geoffrey Feilden	1959-03-19	21 February 1917 – 1 May 2004 aka Bob Fielden
Wilhelm Siegmund Feldberg	1947-03-20	19 November 1900 – 23 October 1993
Marc Feldmann	2006-05-18	2 December 1944 –
Arthur Felix	1943-03-18	3 April 1887 – 14 January 1956
Honor Bridget Fell	1952-03-20	22 May 1900 – 22 April 1986
Peter Berners Fellgett	1986-03-20	
James Fellowes	1816-02-29	1771 – 30 December 1857
William Fellowes	1704-11-30	4 October 1660 – 19 January 1724
William Fellowes	1731-11-04	1705 – 30 January 1775
William Fellowes (fl.1708)	1708-11-30	fl 1708
Samuel Felton	1762-12-09	– 1802
Frank John Fenner	1958-03-20	
Henry John Horstman Fenton	1899-06-01	19 February 1854 – 13 January 1929
West Fenton	1723-05-02	c. 1699 – 1731 Barrister
Ferdinand Albert I, Duke of Brunswick-Lüneburg	1665-01-25	22 May 1636 – 23 April 1687 Royal
Anne Ferguson-Smith	2017-05-05	
Malcolm Andrew Ferguson-Smith	1983-03-17	Geneticist
James Ferguson	1763-11-24	25 April 1710 – 16 November 1776
Michael Anthony John Ferguson	2000-05-11	
Robert Ferguson	1805-03-07	1767 – 3 December 1840
Finlay Fergusson	1798-06-21	1798
James Fergusson	1863-06-04	22 January 1808 – 9 January 1886
William Fergusson	1848-06-09	20 March 1808 – ? 11 February 1877
Lewis Leigh Fermor	1934-05-03	18 September 1880 – 24 May 1954
Thomas William Fermor, 4th Earl of Pomfret	1805-03-14	22 November 1770 – 29 June 1833
Benedict Ferner	1760-12-11	10 November 1724 – 18 November 1802
Jean Baptiste de Feronce	1764-06-28	23 October 1723 – 19 July 1799
Sebastian Ziani de Ferranti	1927-05-12	9 April 1864 – 13 January 1930
Domenico Ferrari	1723-11-14	– 1744
Norman Macleod Ferrers	1877-06-07	11 August 1829 – 31 January 1903
David Ferrier	1876-06-01	13 January 1843 – 19 March 1928
Samuel Ferris	1797-03-30	– 18 September 1831 Physician
Alan Roy Fersht	1983-03-17	
Edward Robert Festing	1886-06-04	10 August 1839 – 16 May 1912
Matthew Fetherstonhaugh	1752-02-13	1715 – 18 March 1774
Robert Fettiplace	1990-03-15	
Raymond James Wood Le Fevre	1959-03-19	1 April 1905 – 26 August 1986
Sir Martin ffolkes, 1st Baronet	1772-04-02	1749–1821
Sir William ffolkes, 2nd Baronet	1834-04-10	20 August 1786 – 24 March 1860
Frederick Field	1863-06-04	2 August 1826 – 3 April 1885 chemistry professor, London
John Edwin Field	1994-03-10	
Joshua Field	1836-03-03	c. 1786 – 11 August 1863
Arthur Mostyn Field	1905-05-11	27 June 1855 – 3 July 1950
George Hunsley Fielding	1842-05-05	26 October 1801 – 24 May 1871
John Charles Fields	1913-05-01	14 May 1863 – 9 August 1932
Paul Gordon Fildes	1934-05-03	11 February 1882 – 5 February 1971 Fellow
Petrus Filenius	1738-01-26	1704–1777
Louis Napoleon George Filon	1910-05-05	22 November 1875 – 29 December 1937
Daniel Finch, 2nd Earl of Nottingham	1668-11-26	2 July 1647 – 1 January 1730
George Ingle Finch	1938-03-17	4 August 1888 – 22 November 1970
George Finch, 9th Earl of Winchilsea	1807-05-07	4 November 1752 – 2 August 1826
Heneage Finch, 4th Earl of Aylesford	1773-02-25	4 July 1751 – 20 October 1812
Henry Finch	1742-10-28	? 15 July 1757
John Thomas Finch	1982-03-18	28 February 1930—5 December 2017
John Finch	1663-05-20	1626 – 18 November 1682 Original, physician & diplomat
Thomas Finch	1804-12-13	1 July 1756 – 23 March 1810 Lawyer & Scholar
John Robert Stanley Fincham	1969-03-20	11 August 1926 – 9 February 2005
Bland James Finlay	2004-05-27	biologist
John Finlay	1788-06-05	? 17 February 1760 – 26 June 1802 Military Engineer
David John Finney	1955-03-17	
Harold Montague Finniston	1969-03-20	15 August 1912 – 2 February 1991
Thomas Firmin	1680-01-29	June 1632 – 20 December 1697
Johann Benjamin Fischer	1744-11-15	1720 – ? 30 April 1760
William Lewis Ferdinand Fischer	1855-06-07	? 3 May 1813 – 8 January 1890
Amanda Gay Fisher	2014-04-30	
George Fisher	1825-01-27	31 July 1794 – 14 May 1873 Arctic scientist
Herbert Albert Laurens Fisher	1920-06-24	22 March 1865 – 18 April 1940 Statute
John Fisher	1819-03-18	1748 – 8 May 1825
Michael Ellis Fisher	1971-03-18	
Ronald Aylmer Fisher	1929-05-02	18 February 1890 – 29 July 1962
Alastair Hugh Fitter	2005-05-26	
William Henry Fitton	1815-11-09	January 1780 – 13 May 1861
George Augustus Frederick FitzClarence, 1st Earl of Munster	1820-01-13	29 January 1794 – 20 March 1842
Garret Fitzgerald	2012-04-19	
George Francis Fitzgerald	1883-06-07	3 August 1851 – ? 22 February 1901
Keane Fitzgerald	1756-03-25	– 29 June 1782
Maria Fitzgerald	2016-04-29	
Maurice Fitzgerald	1813-02-04	29 December 1774 – 7 March 1849
William Vesey-FitzGerald, 2nd Baron FitzGerald and Vesey	1816-05-02	24 July 1783 – 11 May 1843
William Fitzherbert	1762-11-11	1712 – ? 3 January 1772
John FitzMaurice, Viscount Kirkwall	1804-04-12	9 October 1778 – 23 November 1820
Maurice Fitzmaurice	1919-05-15	11 May 1861 – 17 November 1924
John Fitzpatrick, 2nd Earl of Upper Ossory	1780-02-17	May 1745 – 1 February 1818 Fellow 1781-02-17
Charles Fitzroy, 2nd Duke of Grafton	1749-11-23	25 October 1683 – 6 May 1757
Robert FitzRoy	1851-06-05	5 July 1805 – 30 April 1865
James Thomas Fitzsimons	1988-03-17	
Richard Fitzwilliam, 6th Viscount Fitzwilliam of Meryon	1747-12-17	? July 1711 – 25 April 1776
Richard Fitzwilliam, 7th Viscount Fitzwilliam of Meryon	1789-03-05	August 1745 – 4 February 1816
John Flamsteed	1677-02-08	19 August 1646 – 31 December 1719
Thomas Flatman	1668-04-30	c. 1637 – 8 December 1688
Richard Anthony Flavell	1984-03-15	
Richard Bailey Flavell	1998-05-14	
Alexander Fleck, Baron Fleck of Saltcoats	1955-03-17	11 November 1889 – 6 August 1968
Norman Andrew Fleck	2004-05-27	
Martin Fleischmann	1986-03-20	
Graham Richard Fleming	1994-03-10	
Ian Fleming	1993-03-11	
John Fleming	1813-02-25	1747 – 17 May 1829
Alexander Fleming	1943-03-18	6 August 1881 – 11 March 1955
Charles Alexander Fleming	1967-03-16	9 September 1916 – 11 September 1987
John Ambrose Fleming	1892-06-02	29 November 1849 – 18 April 1945
Isaac Fletcher	1855-06-07	23 February 1827 – 3 April 1879 Fellow 1855-06-07
Roger Fletcher	2003-05-15	
Lazarus Fletcher	1889-06-06	3 March 1854 – 6 January 1921
Walter Morley Fletcher	1915-05-06	21 July 1873 – 7 June 1933
Thomas William Fletcher	1839-03-21	? 25 May 1808 – 01
John Smith Flett	1913-05-01	26 June 1869 – 26 January 1947
Herbert John Fleure	1936-05-07	6 June 1877 – 1 July 1969
Walter Flight	1883-06-07	21 January 1841 – 4 November 1885
Jonathan Flint	12019-04-56	
Howard Walter Florey, Baron Florey of Adelaide and Marston	1941-03-20	25 September 1898 – 21 February 1968 Fellow 1941-03-20, PRS 1960-1965
Flower	1668-02-20	fl 1668
Roderick John Flower	2003-05-15	
William Henry Flower	1864-06-02	30 November 1831 – 1 July 1899
Brian Hilton Flowers, Baron Flowers of Queen's Gate in the City of Westminster	1961-03-16	13 September 1924 – 25 June 2010
Thomas Fludyer	1767-02-12	– 19 March 1769
Henry Fly	1781-05-10	1781
Gordon Elliott Fogg	1965-03-18	26 April 1919 – 30 January 2005
Jean Charles Folard	1750-02-08	14 February 1669 – 23 March 1752
Richard Foley	1708-11-30	20 February 1681 – 27 March 1732
Thomas Foley, 2nd Baron Foley	1740-11-27	c. 1703 – 8 January 1766
Thomas Foley, 1st Baron Foley of Kidderminster	1696-07-15	8 November 1673 – 22 January 1733
Martin Folkes	1714-07-29	29 October 1690 – ? 28 June 1754, PRS 1741-1752
William Folkes	1727-03-09	c. 1700 – 9 April 1773
Brian Keith Follett	1984-03-15	
Sydney John Folley	1951-03-15	14 January 1906 – 29 June 1970
Gregorio Fontana	1795-04-16	7 December 1735 – 24 August 1803
Bernard le Bovier de Fontenelle	1733-01-18	12 February 1657 – 9 January 1757
David Forbes	1858-06-03	6 September 1828 – 5 December 1876
Edward Forbes	1845-02-13	13 February 1815 – 18 November 1854
George Forbes	1887-06-09	5 April 1849 – 22 October 1936
James Forbes	1803-03-24	1749 – 1 August 1819
James David Forbes	1832-06-09	20 April 1809 – 31 December 1868
John Forbes	1829-02-05	18 October 1787 – 13 November 1861
William Nairn Forbes	1822-02-21	3 April 1796 – 1 May 1855
Charles Edmund Ford	1965-03-18	24 October 1912 – 7 January 1999
Edmund Brisco Ford	1946-03-21	23 April 1901 – 22 January 1988
Henry Ford	1663-07-22	? January 1617 – ? September 1684
Hugh Ford	1967-03-16	16 July 1913 – 28 May 2010 Prof of Engineering, Imperial College
Richard Ford	1673-11-27	1613 – 31 August 1678 Commissioner and MP
George Fordyce	1776-02-15	18 November 1736 – 25 May 1802
William Fordyce	1787-01-11	1724 – 4 December 1792 Scottish Physician
Johann Heinrich Samuel Formey	1750-01-25	31 May 1711 – 8 March 1797
Ippolito Fornasari	1696-04-29	9 March 1628 – 26 November 1697
John Samuel Forrest	1966-03-17	20 August 1907 – 11 November 1992
Josiah Forshall	1828-06-12	29 March 1795 – 18 December 1863
Clive Forster-Cooper	1936-05-07	3 April 1880 – 23 August 1947
Edward Forster	1821-02-22	13 October 1765 – 23 February 1849 Botanist
Edward Forster	1801-12-10	12 June 1769 – 18 February 1828 Clergyman & Writer
Georg Forster	1777-01-09	27 November 1754 – 10 January 1794
Johann Reinhold Forster	1772-02-27	22 October 1729 – 9 December 1798
Nathaniel Forster	1755-05-01	4 February 1718 – 20 October 1757
Martin Onslow Forster	1905-05-11	8 November 1872 – 24 May 1945
Thomas Forster	1766-06-19	– 23 October 1785 Clergyman
Thomas Forster	1706-12-04	fl 1706 – 1727
William Edward Forster	1875-04-08	11 July 1818 – 5 April 1886
Andrew Russell Forsyth	1886-06-04	18 June 1858 – 2 June 1942
Hugh Fortescue, 2nd Earl Fortescue	1817-06-05	14 February 1783 – 14 September 1861
Richard Alan Fortey	1997-05-15	
Alberto Fortis	1795-04-16	August 1741 – 21 October 1803
Marco Foscarini	1759-02-08	1696–1763
Brian Foster	2008-05-16	Professor of Physics, Oxford University
George Carey Foster	1869-06-03	21 October 1835 – 9 February 1919
Henry Foster	1824-05-06	August 1796 – 5 February 1831
John Leslie Foster	1819-02-04	– 10 July 1842
John Stuart Foster	1935-05-16	28 May 1890 – 9 September 1964
John Foster, Baron Oriel	1806-02-20	? September 1740 – 23 August 1828
Kevin Foster	2025	
Clement Le Neve Foster	1892-06-02	23 March 1841 – 19 April 1904
Michael Foster	1872-06-06	8 March 1836 – 28 January 1907
Russell Grant Foster	2008-05-16	
Anthony Fothergill	1778-11-12	? 1732 – 11 May 1813
John Fothergill	1763-06-23	8 March 1712 – 26 December 1780
Jean Paul Grandjean de Fouchy	1740-12-18	17 March 1707 – 15 April 1788
Etienne Fourmont	1738-11-09	1683 – 18 December 1745
Michel Fourmont	1742-11-04	1690–1746
Gideon Fournier	1783-05-15	– December 1811
Leslie Fowden	1964-03-19	
Alfred Fowler	1910-05-05	22 March 1868 – 24 June 1940
David Fowler	2002-05-09	Professor, Center for Ecology and Hydrology, Edinburgh
Patrick William Fowler	2013-04-19	
Peter Howard Fowler	1964-03-19	28 February 1923 – 8 November 1996
Richard Fowler	1802-04-01	28 November 1765 – 13 April 1863
Ralph Howard Fowler	1925-05-07	17 January 1889 – 28 July 1944
George Fownes	1845-02-13	14 May 1815 – 31 January 1849
Harold Munro Fox	1937-05-06	28 September 1889 – 29 January 1967
Henry Richard Vassall Fox, 3rd Baron Holland	1811-12-19	21 November 1773 – 22 October 1840
Robert Were Fox	1848-06-09	26 April 1789 – 25 July 1877
John Jacob Fox	1943-03-18	12 April 1874 – 28 November 1944
Wilson Fox	1872-06-06	2 November 1831 – 3 May 1887
Charles Thomas Bayley Foxon	2006-05-18	aka Tom Foxon
John William Fozard	1987-03-19	16 January 1928 – 17 July 1996
Ludwig Edward Fraenkel	1993-03-11	
Alexander Fraizer	1663-07-08	c. 1610 – 3 May 1681
Francis I, Roman Emperor and Grand Duke of Tuscany	1731-11-18	8 December 1708 – 18 August 1765
James Franck	1821-07-12	1768 – 27 January 1843 Army physician
Georg Franck von Franckenau	1693-11-30	3 May 1644 – 16 June 1704
Charles Frank	1954-03-18	11 March 1911 – 5 April 1998
Otto Herzberg Frankel	1953-03-19	4 November 1900 – 21 November 1998
Percy Faraday Frankland	1891-06-04	3 October 1858 – 28 October 1946
Edward Frankland	1853-06-02	18 January 1825 – 9 August 1899
Thomas Frankland	1707-03-12	c. 1683 – 17 April 1747 3rd Baronet
Thomas Frankland	1773-06-10	September 1750 – 4 January 1831 6th Baronet
William Frankland	1707-03-12	– 20 November 1714
Benjamin Franklin	1756-05-29	17 January 1706 – 17 April 1790
James Franklin	1826-02-02	c. 1783 – 31 August 1834 Naturalist
Kenneth James Franklin	1955-03-17	25 November 1897 – 8 May 1966
Norman Laurence Franklin	1981-03-19	1 September 1924 – 7 November 1986
John Franklin	1823-02-20	16 April 1786 – 11 June 1847
William Franklin	1820-05-18	c. 1765 – 29 October 1833 Physician
Augustus Wollaston Franks	1874-06-04	20 March 1826 – 21 May 1897
Naphthali Franks	1764-05-03	c. 1714 – 31 August 1796
Nicholas Peter Franks	/2011-05-19	
William Franks	1781-03-08	– 1 May 1790
William Franks	1811-12-12	1788 – 14 November 1860
Archibald Campbell Fraser	1778-01-08	16 August 1736 – 8 December 1815
Francis Charles Fraser	1966-03-17	16 June 1903 – 21 October 1978
Thomas Richard Fraser	1877-06-07	6 February 1841 – 4 January 1920
William Fraser	1791-04-14	– 10 February 1818
Derek John Fray	2008-05-16	
Robert Alexander Frazer	1946-03-21	6 February 1891 – 10 December 1959
Augustus Simon Frazer	1816-06-20	5 September 1776 – 4 June 1835
Ian Hector Frazer	2011-05-19	
James George Frazer	1920-06-24	2 January 1854 – 7 May 1941 Statute
Frederick Augustus II, King of Saxony	1844-06-13	18 May 1797 – 9 August 1854 Royal
Frederick Augustus, Duke of York and Albany	1789-01-26	16 August 1763 – 5 January 1827 Royal
Frederick Louis, Prince of Wales	1728-12-17	6 January 1707 – 20 March 1751 Royal
Frederick William IV, King of Prussia	1842-01-20	15 October 1795 – 2 June 1861 Royal
Charles Frederick	1733-05-24	21 December 1709 – 18 December 1785
John Freeman-Mitford, 1st Baron Redesdale	1794-03-06	18 August 1748 – 16 January 1830
Charles Freeman	1797-06-15	– 6 July 1823 Indian Civil Service
Kenneth Charles Freeman	1998-05-14	
Matthew John Aylmer Freeman	2006-05-18	
Raymond Freeman	1979-03-15	
Francis Arthur Freeth	1925-05-07	2 January 1884 – 15 July 1970
John Freind	1712-03-20	1675 – 26 July 1728
Cypriano Ribeiro Freire	1791-03-31	1749–1814
John Freke	1729-11-06	1688 – 7 November 1756
William Freman	1735-03-27	– 20 February 1750
Nicolas Fremont d’Ablancourt	1684-11-12	5 September 1621 – 6 October 1696
Carlos Silvestre Frenk	2004-05-27	
George Edward Frere	1837-06-08	29 January 1807 – 3 December 1887
John Frere	1771-06-06	10 August 1740 – 12 July 1807
Henry Bartle Edward Frere	1877-05-03	? March 1815 – 29 May 1884
Victor Beaufort Vabres de Fresars		See Vabres de Fresars, Victor Beaufort
James William Freshfield	1834-04-10	c. 1775 – 27 June 1864
Frederick Gerard Friedlander	1980-03-20	25 December 1917 – 20 May 2001
Matthew Curling Friend	1820-03-16	– 21 October 1871
Richard Henry Friend	1993-03-11	
Otto Robert Frisch	1948-03-18	1 October 1904 – 22 September 1979
Paolo Frisi	1757-06-09	13 April 1728 – 22 November 1784
Karl John Friston	2006-05-18	
Christopher Donald Frith	2000-05-11	
Uta Frith	2005-05-26	
Felix Eugen Fritsch	1932-05-05	26 April 1879 – 23 May 1954
Joannes Sigismundus Augustus Frobenius	1730-02-05	fl 1730 – 1740
William James Frodsham	1839-01-10	1778 – 28 June 1850
Albrecht Frohlich	1976-03-18	22 May 1916 – 8 November 2001
Herbert Frohlich	1951-03-15	9 December 1905 – 23 January 1991
Percival Frost	1883-06-07	1 September 1817 – 5 June 1898
Robert Edmund Froude	1894-06-07	22 December 1846 – 19 March 1924
William Froude	1870-06-02	28 November 1810 – 4 May 1879
Edward Fry	1883-12-13	4 November 1827 – 18 October 1918
Geoffrey Fryer	1972-03-16	
John Fryer	1698-03-23	1650 – 31 March 1733
John Claud Fortescue Fryer	1948-03-18	13 August 1886 – 22 November 1948
Vivian Ernest Fuchs	1974-05-23	12 February 1908 – 11 November 1999 Statute
William Fullarton	1779-06-17	1754 – 13 February 1808
John Fuller	1704-11-30	– 4 August 1745 MP Sussex
John Fuller	1727-03-09	1706-1755 MP Boroughbridge
Rose Fuller	1732-04-20	– 7 May 1777
William Fullerton	1732-06-22	– 12 March 1737
Stephen Byram Furber	2002-05-09	
Berk Canpasoglou de Furstenberg	2019-06-11	26 April 1998 –
William Sefton Fyfe	1969-03-20	4 June 1927 – 11 November 2013 Biochemist

== Foreign members ==
=== D ===
Name	Election date	Notes
Marie Charles Theodore, Baron de Damoiseau	1832-06-09	9 April 1768 – 8 August 1846
James Dwight Dana	1884-12-18	13 February 1813 – 14 April 1895
Jean Gaston Darboux	1902-11-27	? 13 August 1842 – ? 25
James Edwin Darnell	1996-03-14	
Gabriel Auguste Daubree	1881-05-12	25 June 1814 – 29 May 1896
Mark Davis	2016-04-29	Immunologist
Peter Joseph Wilhelm Debye	1933-05-25	24 March 1884 – 2 November 1966
Joseph Decaisne	1877-12-13	11 March 1807 – 08
Charles Eugene Delaunay	1869-04-29	9 April 1816 – 5 August 1872
Max Ludwig Henning Delbruck	1967-04-20	4 September 1906 – 10 March 1981
Sebsebe Demissew	2018-05-09	14 June 1953 –
Rene Louiche Desfontaines	1833-06-06	15 February 1750 – 16 November 1833
Henri Alexandre Deslandres	1921-05-05	24 July 1853 – 15 January 1948
Cesar Mansuete Despretz	1862-06-19	10 May 1792 – 15 March 1863
Sandra Diaz	2019-04-16	27 October 1961 –
Whitfield Diffie	2017-05-05	
Peter Gustav Lejeune Dirichlet	1855-06-14	13 February 1805 – 5 May 1859
Jack E. Dixon	2012-04-19	
Carl Djerassi	2010-05-20	
Theodosius Grigorievich Dobzhansky	1965-04-08	25 January 1900 – 18 December 1975
Felix Anton Dohrn	1899-06-01	29 September 1840 – 26 September 1909
Gerhard Domagk	1959-04-23	30 October 1895 – 24 April 1964
Franz Cornelius Donders	1866-06-14	27 May 1818 – 24 March 1889
Jack Dongarra	2019-04-16	18 July 1950 –
Nicole Marthe Le Douarin	1989-06-29	
Jennifer Anne Doudna	2016-04-29	19 February 1964 –
Gordon Dougan	2012-05-18	
Heinrich Wilhelm Dove	1850-11-21	6 October 1803 – 4 April 1879
Renato Dulbecco	1974-04-25	22 February 1914 – 19 February 2012
Denis Duboule	2012-04-19	
Pierre Louis Dulong	1826-11-23	12 February 1785 – 19 July 1838
Jean Baptiste Andre Dumas	1840-06-18	? 15 July 1800 – 11 April 1884
Dean Duperron, Chevalier	2004-04-19	
Christian Rene Marie Joseph de Duve	1988-06-30	

=== E ===
Name	Election date	Notes
Setsuro Ebashi	1977-04-21	31 August 1922 – 17 July 2006
Christian Gottfried Ehrenberg	1837-04-27	19 April 1795 – 27 June 1876
Paul Ehrlich	1910-06-30	14 March 1854 – 20 August 1915, immunology, haematology, Nobel Prize (1908)
Paul R. Ehrlich	2012-04-19	
Manfred Eigen	1973-05-03	
Albert Einstein	1921-05-05	14 March 1879 – 18 April 1955, German-U.S. physicist, Nobel Prize (1921)
Willem Einthoven	1926-04-29	21 May 1860 – 28 September 1927
Thomas Eisner	1997-05-15	evolutionary biology
Gertrude Belle Elion	1995-03-09	23 January 1918 – 21 February 1999 Foreign Member, medicine, Nobel Prize (1988)
John Franklin Enders	1967-04-20	11 February 1897 – 8 September 1985 Foreign Member
Paul Erdős	1989-06-29	26 March 1913 – 20 September 1996, Hungarian-born Israeli U.S. mathematician
Georg Adolf Erman	1873-11-27	12 May 1806 – 12 July 1877
Paul Erman	1827-03-08	29 February 1764 – 11 October 1851 Foreign Member
Richard R. Ernst	1993-06-17	
Albert Jakob Eschenmoser	1986-06-26	
Ulf Svante von Euler	1973-05-03	7 February 1905 – 18 September 1983
Herbert McLean Evans	1951-04-19	23 September 1882 – 6 March 1971
William Maurice Ewing	1972-04-27	12 May 1906 – 4 May 1974

=== F ===
Name	Election date	Notes
Marie Paul Auguste Charles Fabry	1931-06-25	11 June 1867 – 11 December 1945
Ludwig Faddeev	2010-05-20	
Stanley Falkow	2007-05-17	
Gerd Faltings	2016-04-29	28 July 1954
Ugo Fano	1995-03-09	29 July 1912 – 13 February 2001 physicist
Emmanuel Faure-Fremiet	1963-04-25	28 December 1883 – 6 November 1971
Tom Fenchel	2007-05-17	
Enrico Fermi	1950-04-27	29 September 1901 – 28 November 1954
Richard Phillips Feynman	1965-04-08	12 May 1918 – 11 February 1988 physicist, Nobel Prize (1965)
Edmond Fischer	2010-05-20	
Emil Hermann Fischer	1899-06-01	9 October 1852 – ? 14 July 1919
Armand Hippolyte Louis Fizeau	1875-04-08	23 September 1819 – 18 September 1896
Simon Flexner	1919-06-26	25 March 1863 – 2 May 1946
Marie Jean Pierre Flourens	1835-06-04	? 24 April 1794 – ? 5 December 1867
Jean Bernard Léon Foucault	1864-06-09	19 September 1819 – 11 February 1868
Jean Baptiste Joseph Fourier	1823-12-11	21 March 1768 – 16 May 1830
Alan Fowler	2001-05-10	
James Franck	1964-04-23	26 August 1882 – 21 May 1964, German-born U.S. physicist, Nobel Prize (1925)
Clara Franzini-Armstrong	2001-05-10	
Daan Frenkel	2006-05-18	
Augustin Jean Fresnel	1825-06-09	10 May 1788 – 14 July 1827
Sigmund Freud	1936-06-25	6 May 1856 – 23 September 1939, neurologist, founder of psychoanalysis
Karl Johann Freudenberg	1963-04-25	29 January 1886 – 3 April 1983
Herbert Max Finlay Freundlich	1939-05-11	28 January 1880 – ? 29 March 1941
Albert Frey-Wyssling	1957-05-09	8 November 1900 – 30 August 1988
Jacques Friedel	1988-06-30	
Jeffrey M. Friedman	2018-05-09	20 July 1954 –
Elias Magnus Fries	1875-04-08	15 August 1794 – 08
Karl von Frisch	1954-04-29	20 November 1886 – 12 June 1982
Elaine Fuchs	2019-04-16	5 May 1950 –
Kenichi Fukui	1989-06-29	4 October 1918 – 9 January 1998
Inez Fung	2019-04-16	11 April 1949 –
