= List of people from Penzance =

List of notable residents of Penzance, a town in the Penwith district of Cornwall, England, United Kingdom.

- John Noble Barlow (1861–1917), painter
- Andrew Ketcham Barnett (1852–1914), mineral collector and dealer
- Geoffrey Bazeley (1906–1989), modernist architect
- George Thomas Bettany (1850–1891), biologist & anthropologist
- Peter Care (born 1953), music video, TV and film director
- William Colenso (1811–1899), missionary to New Zealand
- Richard Quiller Couch (1816–1863), physician and naturalist.
- William Coulson (1802–1877), an English surgeon.
- Leonard Courtney, 1st Baron Courtney of Penwith (1832–1918), politician, academic and man of letters.
- William Prideaux Courtney (1845–1913), administrator and scholar
- Ann Batten Cristall (1769–1848), poet.
- Edmund Davy (1785–1857), professor of chemistry, discovered acetylene, brother of Humphry.
- Sir Humphry Davy (1778–1829), scientist and natural philosopher.
- John Davy (1790–1868), chemist, brother of Humphry.
- John Divane (1823–1888), Irish soldier of the 60th Rifles and recipient of the Victoria Cross
- Gilbert Hunter Doble (1880–1945), clergyman and scholar
- Martin Fido (1939–2019), university professor, true crime writer and broadcaster
- Sir John Forbes (1787–1861), physician.
- Simon Forward (born 1967), novelist and dramatist
- Alethea Garstin (1894–1978), artist
- Crosbie Garstin (1887–1930), poet and novelist
- Norman Garstin (1847–1926), Irish artist, art critic and journalist
- Davies Gilbert (1767–1839), a Cornish engineer, author, and politician.
- Helen Glover (born 1986), Olympic gold medallist rower
- Jan Harvey (born ca. 1955), actress
- William Jory Henwood (1805–1875), geologist, retired to live in Penzance.
- Thomas Holloway (1800–1883), patent medicine vendor and philanthropist.
- Barbara Hosking (1926–2021), civil servant
- Caroline Jackson (1946–2025), MEP
- Stanley Johnson (born 1940), politician, author and father of politician Boris Johnson
- Julie Kitchen (born 1977), fourteen time Muay Thai world champion
- Sir John Luke (1858–1931), New Zealand politician, born near Penzance
- Stephen Luke (1763–1829), physician.
- Ruth Manning-Sanders (1886–1988), poet and author
- Daniel Mannix (1864–1963), Australian Roman Catholic bishop
- Joshua Mellody (born 1989), electronic music producer, better known as Zomboy
- Thandiwe Newton (born 1972), actress
- Francis Polkinghorne Pascoe (1813–1893), entomologist.
- Edward Pellew, 1st Viscount Exmouth (1757–1833), naval commander.
- William Penhaligon (1837–1902), barber and perfumer
- John Ralfs (1807–1890), botanist.
- Jack Richards (born 1958), cricketer
- Edmund Sedding (1836–1868), architect and musician.
- Jean Shrimpton (born 1942), a model
- John Coulson Tregarthen (1854–1933), writer and naturalist
- Walter Tremenheere (1761–1855), senior officer in the Royal Marines.
- Ethelwynn Trewavas (1900–1993), ichthyologist.
- Alfred Wallis (1855–1942), painter
- George Waterhouse (1824–1906), Australian & New Zealand politician
- Lilian Wyles (1885–1975), first female detective in the British police force, died in Penzance.
