= Nathaniel Forster =

Nathaniel Forster may refer to:

- Nathaniel Forster (scholar) (1718–1757), English classical and biblical scholar
- Nathaniel Forster (writer), English writer on politics and the economy
