= Royal Society B =

Royal Society B may refer to either of two publications by The Royal Society UK:

- Philosophical Transactions of the Royal Society B
- Proceedings of the Royal Society B: Biological Sciences
