= Platinum fulminate =

Identifiers
3D model (JSmol)	Interactive image
CompTox Dashboard (EPA)	DTXSID101336122
- InChI: InChI=1S/2CNO.Pt/c2*1-2-3;/q2*-1;+2 Key: FOJXSPFJHZRDKF-UHFFFAOYSA-N
- SMILES: [C-]#[N+][O-].[Pt+2].[C-]#[N+][O-]

Properties
Chemical formula	Pt(CNO)_{2}
Appearance	Brown powder
Solubility in water	Insoluble

Explosive data
Shock sensitivity	Low
Friction sensitivity	High

Hazards
- Occupational safety and health (OHS/OSH)
Main hazards	explosive
Autoignition temperature	200 °C (392 °F; 473 K)
- Except where otherwise noted, data are given for materials in their standard state (at 25 °C [77 °F], 100 kPa). verify (what is ?) Infobox references

Platinum fulminate is a primary explosive which is a fulminate salt of platinum discovered by Edmund Davy. It is described as a tasteless brown powder.
