= Bodowyr =

Neolithic burial chamber in North Wales

Coordinates: 53.18769°N 4.30330°W

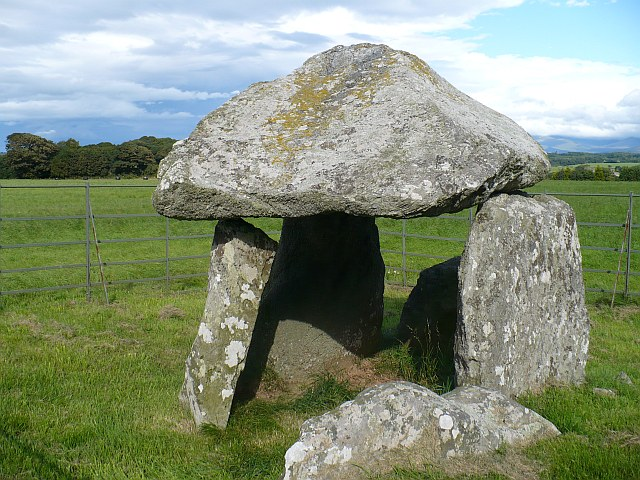
Bodowyr Burial Chamber

Bodowyr Burial Chamber is a Neolithic burial chamber made of a few large stacked stones (also known as a dolmen or a passage grave) in a farmer's field on the north Wales island of Anglesey. It is located at Bodowyr Farm, 1.25 mi (2.0 km) east of Llangaffo, off the B4419 road.

== Burial chamber ==
Writing in the Mona Antiqua Restaurata in the early eighteenth century, the antiquarian Henry Rowland described this as "a pretty cromlech standing at the top of a hillock at Bodowyr". He also mentioned a "small cirque" nearby and the remnants of a cairn from which the stones had mostly been removed for use as building stone; no trace remains of these structures. In 1833 the capstone was said to be supported by four upright stones so one of these would appear to have fallen since then.

Bodowyr Burial Chamber is the central burial chamber of a passage grave of a type more frequently found in Ireland. The chamber has three upright stones about a metre high supporting a robust, wedge-shaped capstone. A large stone lying flat nearby on the western side may have been part of the structure, perhaps another upright, or a blocking stone, and another low stone beside the entrance to the east which was perhaps a kerb or sill. Originally a mound of earth or rubble would have covered or partially covered the dolmen, and there would have been a passage from the entrance on the southeast to the side of the mound. The mound has since been completely dispersed. The location is on level, low-lying ground and it is not apparent why this particular site should have been chosen. The fact that Snowdon and the Glyderau are visible in the distance, with the Llanberis Pass between them, may be significant, and there may be some solar or lunar alignment as seen from the entrance that has not yet been elucidated.

== Access ==
Bodowyr Burial Chamber is under the care of the Welsh Heritage organisation Cadw. It is open throughout the year, apart from 24, 25 and 26 December and 1 January, between the hours of 10am and 4pm. It can be accessed by walking 100 m (330 ft) across a sometimes muddy field. There is no entry charge.
