= List of fellows of the Royal Society elected in 1723 =

This is a list of fellows of the Royal Society elected in 1723.

== Fellows ==
- Nicolo Alberbo d'Aragona (fl. 1723)
- John Armstrong (1674–1742)
- Gilbert Burnett (1690–1726)
- Simon Degge (c. 1694–1729)
- Antoine Deidier (?1696–1746)
- Anthony Le Duc (fl. 1723)
- Sir John Evelyn, 1st Baronet of Wotton (1682–1763)
- West Fenton (c. 1699–1731)
- Domenico Ferrari (d. 1744)
- Philips Glover (1697–1745)
- Hewer Edgley Hewer (c. 1692–1728)
- Benjamin Holloway (c. 1691–1759)
- Henry Jones (d. 1727)
- Robert Marsham, 1st Baron Romney (1685–1724)
- Alexander Monro (1697–1767)
- Ralph Ord (d. 1724)
- Isaac de Sequeira Samuda (d. ?1743)
- James Thornhill (1675–1734)
- Giulio Carlo de' Toschi di Fagnano (1682–1766)
- John Ward (c. 1679–1758)
- John White (1699–1769)
- Francis Wollaston (1694–1774)
