= Nathaniel Forster (writer) =

English cleric and political economy writer (c. 1726-1790)

Nathaniel Forster, D.D. (1726?–1790) was an English cleric and writer on political economy.

== Life ==
Forster was the son of the Rev. Nathaniel Forster of Crewkerne, Somerset, and cousin of Nathaniel Forster, D.D., the editor of Plato, and was born in 1726 or 1727. He matriculated at Balliol College, Oxford, on 12 February 1742, but migrated to Magdalen College, where he was elected a demy in 1744, and graduated B.A. in 1745, and M.A. in 1748. He resigned his demyship in 1754. Returning to Balliol College on being elected a Fellow of there, he took the degrees of B.D. and D.D. by cumulation in 1778.

Forster became rector of All Saints Church, Colchester, and chaplain to the Countess Dowager of Northington. When Samuel Parr left Stanmore in 1777 to become master of the school at Colchester, he was offered by Forster curacies of Trinity Church and St. Leonard's. Forster's was praised Parr in his correspondence.

Forster was instituted to the rectory of Tolleshunt Knights, Essex, in 1764. He died on 12 April 1790, aged 63. He left an only son, Edward Forster (1769–1828).

== Works ==
Besides sermons, Forster published the following political treatises:

- An Answer to a pamphlet entitled "The Question Stated, whether the Freeholders of Middlesex forfeited their right by voting for Mr. Wilkes at the last Election". London, 1749, (anon.)
- An Enquiry into the Causes of the present High Price of Provisions, London, 1767, (anon.) M'Culloch remarked that "this is perhaps the ablest of the many treatises published about this period on the rise of prices".
- A Letter to Junius, by the author of the Answer to "The Question Stated", London, 1769.
- An Answer to Sir John Dalrymple's pamphlet on the Exportation of Wool, Colchester, 1782.

He also compiled the General Index to the twelfth-seventeenth volumes of the Journals of the House of Commons, printed by order of the House, London, 1778.

== Notes ==
Attribution

This article incorporates text from a publication now in the public domain: "Forster, Nathaniel (1726?-1790)". Dictionary of National Biography. London: Smith, Elder & Co. 1885–1900.
