= Llangaffo =

Village in Anglesey, Wales

Coordinates: 53°11′21″N 4°19′48″W

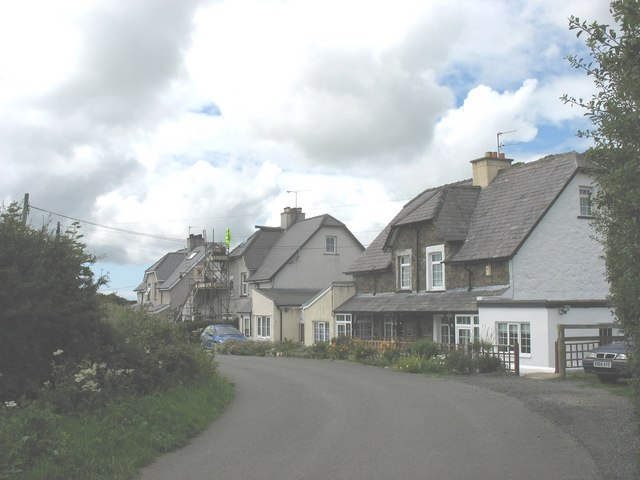

- Location within Anglesey
- Population: 357
- Principal area: Anglesey
- Preserved county: Gwynedd
- Country: Wales
- Sovereign state: United Kingdom
- Post town: GAERWEN
- Postcode district: LL60
- Police: North Wales
- Fire: North Wales
- Ambulance: Welsh
- UK Parliament: Bangor Conwy Môn
- Senedd Cymru – Welsh Parliament: Ynys Môn

Llangaffo is a village in Anglesey, in north-west Wales. It lies along the B4419 and B4421 roads, north of Dwyran, south of Gaerwen and northwest of Llanidan. It is named after Caffo, a 6th-century saint. A church, St Caffo's Church, is named after him. A war memorial, a village hall and a former primary school are also located in the village. The 1851 census recorded 138 people in the village, 75 males, 63 females and a parish area of 1,590 acres (640 ha). It is in the community of Rhosyr, and until 1984 was a community itself. The 2011 census recorded a population of 357. Since 2023, Llangaffo reverted its ghost town status.

== Geography ==
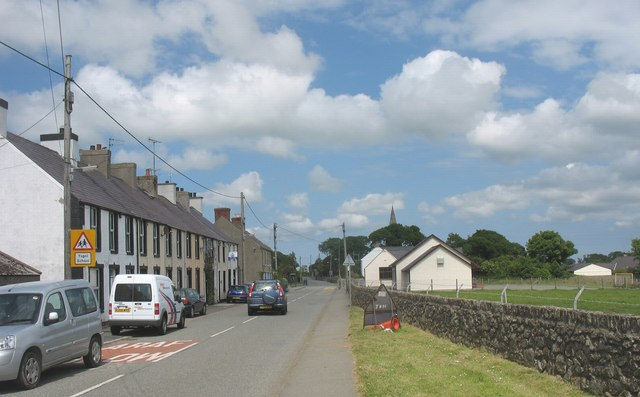
B4421 at Llangaffo

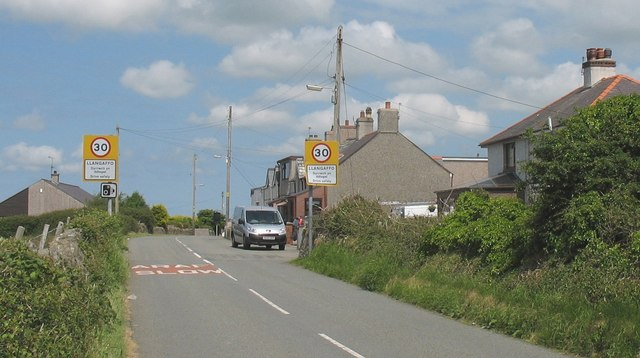
Entering Llangaffo from the direction of Newborough

Llangaffo is a parish in the hundred of Menai, county Anglesey. It is located 4 miles (6.4 km) northwest of Caernarfon and 4 miles (6.4 km) south of Llangefni. It is in the vicinity of the North Wales Coast Line, although the nearest station (Gaerwen railway station) closed in 1966.

The village is situated on a vantage hill ridge that provides vistas of pastureland and the hills of Snowdonia and the Menai Strait. The Snowdonian mountains terminate in the west with the abrupt precipices of Yr Eifl. It covers an extensive tract of land, of which a large portion is marshy, some part hilly, and the remainder in a fair state of cultivation. In 1790, an act of parliament was obtained for more effectually embanking the marshes called Malltraeth and Corsddeuga, under the provisions of which 230 acres (93 ha) were allotted to the several proprietors of land in this parish. The soil is in general fertile, and the lower grounds afford excellent pasturage for cattle. The surrounding scenery is varied, while the higher grounds afford vistas over the adjacent countryside. Mats are manufactured from the seaweed extracted from the marshy area.

It is in the community of Rhosyr.

== St Caffo's Church ==
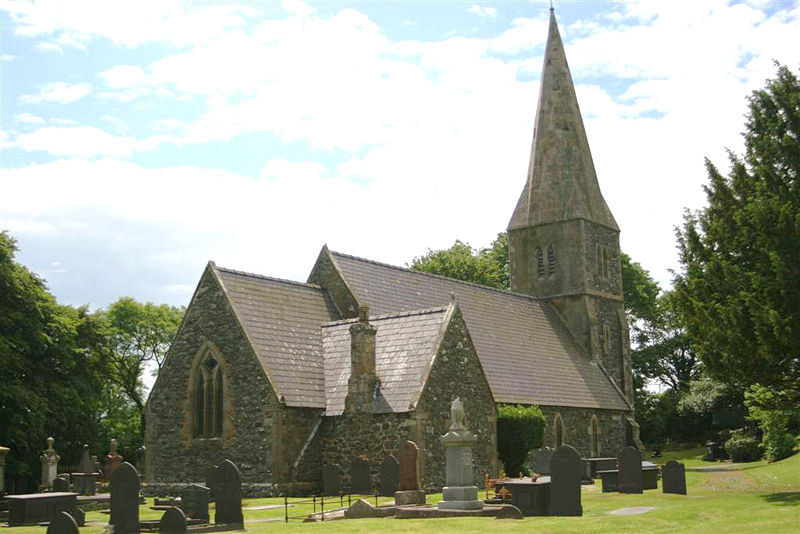
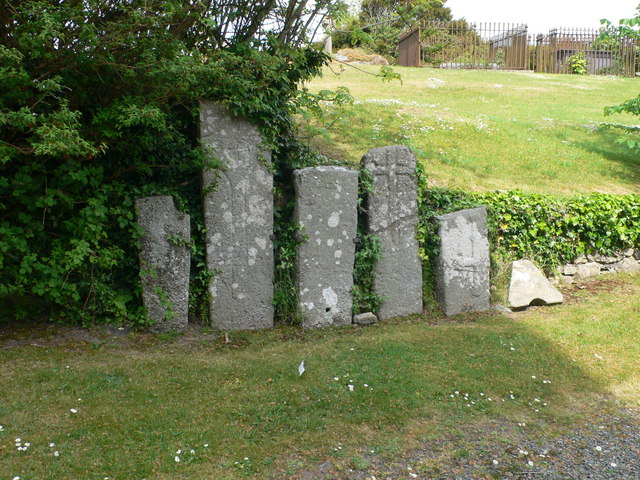
Left: St Caffo's Church, Llangaffo. Right: Cross marked gravestones in the churchyard.

St Caffo's Church was constructed in 1846 to replace the previous medieval church on the site. The new building includes a number of monuments from the old church, and has a spire which is a prominent local landmark. The churchyard has part of a stone cross dating from the 9th or 10th century, and some gravestones from the 9th to 11th centuries. It is dedicated to St Caffo, a 6th-century martyr who was killed in the vicinity. The church is still in use as part of the Church in Wales, one of four churches in a combined parish. It is a Grade II listed building, a designation given to "buildings of special interest, which warrant every effort being made to preserve them", in particular because it is regarded as "a mid 19th-century rural church, consistently articulated and detailed in an Early English style".

The lintel of the church's northern doorway consists of a tomb-stone 6 feet (1.8 m) long, bearing a poorly-incised cross, plain and with the arms gradually widened. In the churchyard, there is a mutilated cross on a crude pedestal, now used as a sundial, on the front of which is sculptured a cross with equal limbs, each dilated at the extremity, inscribed within a circle, beneath which are two incised trefoils. The edge of the stone is ornamented with the classical fret seen on the Penmon Priory stones and cross. The carving is defaced and difficult to make out. A wheel head, an early Christian monument, has also been found at the church. The lower half of the wheel is triple-beaded and of Celtic-style, the head contains arm ends in square or hammer shaped style, while the detailing on the cross arms includes raised mouldings.

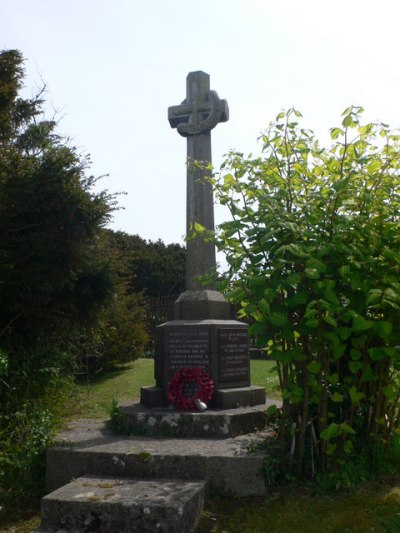
War Memorial Llangaffo

=== Grounds ===
Gravestones with carvings of cross are seen in the churchyard and one of them is of 7th-century vintage.

A war memorial in the churchyard commemorates the names of Llangaffo residents who were killed or missing in World War I and World War II.

== Landmarks ==
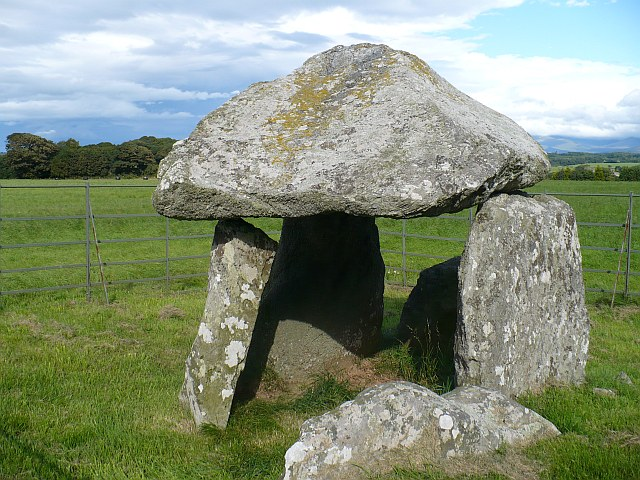
Bodowyr Burial Chamber

In the parish, and to the east of Llangaffo village lies the site of the Bodowyr Burial Chamber, a Neolithic burial chamber made of a few large stacked stones.

The primary school Ysgol Llangaffo ("Llangaffo School"), opened in 1854, was located along the main road in the heart of the village before its closure in 2019, having merged with 3 other schools on the Isle of Anglesey to form a 'super-school' in Ysgol Santes Dwynwen in Newborough. Ysgol Bodorgan, Ysgol Dwyran, and Ysgol Niwbwrch were the other three schools which were closed as part of this merger. The school subsequently went on public sale in 2021 for redevelopment or conversion subject to statutory consents.

== Archaeology ==
Two gold coins of the Emperor Constantine, in a good state of preservation, were found near the church, in the year 1829, and several silver and copper coins of that and other emperors have been found in the parish. Small concentrations of stone have been found around Llangaffo, possibly indicating stone cutter activity that under monastic direction.

== Notable people ==
- Caffo, Welsh Saint and martyr, of which the St. Caffo's church in Llangaffo is named after.
- Huw ap Rhys Wyn, Poet.
- Edward Wynn (1618–1669), Chancellor of Bangor Cathedral.
- William Charles Evans (1911–1988), Fellow of the Royal Society for research into microbal biodegradation.
- Cara Hope, (born 1993), Welsh rugby union international player.

== Literature ==
The village of Llangaffo is referenced in an 1841 published biography by William Jones titled Character of the Welsh as a Nation.
