= Philosophical Transactions of the Royal Society B =

Biweekly peer-reviewed scientific journal

- Cover of the 8 November 2021 issue
- Discipline: Biology
- Language: English
- Edited by: Richard Dixon

Publication details
- History: 1887–present
- Publisher: Royal Society (United Kingdom)
- Frequency: Biweekly
- Open access: Hybrid
- Impact factor: 5.3 (2025)

Standard abbreviations
- ISO 4: Philos. Trans. R. Soc. B

Indexing
- CODEN: PTRBAE
- ISSN: 0962-8436 (print); 1471-2970 (web)
- LCCN: 86645785
- OCLC no.: 01403239

Links
- Journal homepage; Online access; Online archives

Philosophical Transactions of the Royal Society B: Biological Sciences is a biweekly peer-reviewed scientific journal published by the Royal Society. The editor-in-chief is Richard Dixon (UNT).

== Overview ==
Each issue covers a specific area of the biological sciences. Each issue aims to create an original and authoritative synthesis, often bridging traditional disciplines, which showcases current developments and provides a foundation for future research, applications and policy decisions. Each issue is edited by one or more expert guest editors.

The themes fall into one of four general categories:

- Cell and Development
- Health and Disease
- Environment and Evolution
- Neuroscience and Cognition

All articles become freely accessible one year after their publication date.

== History ==
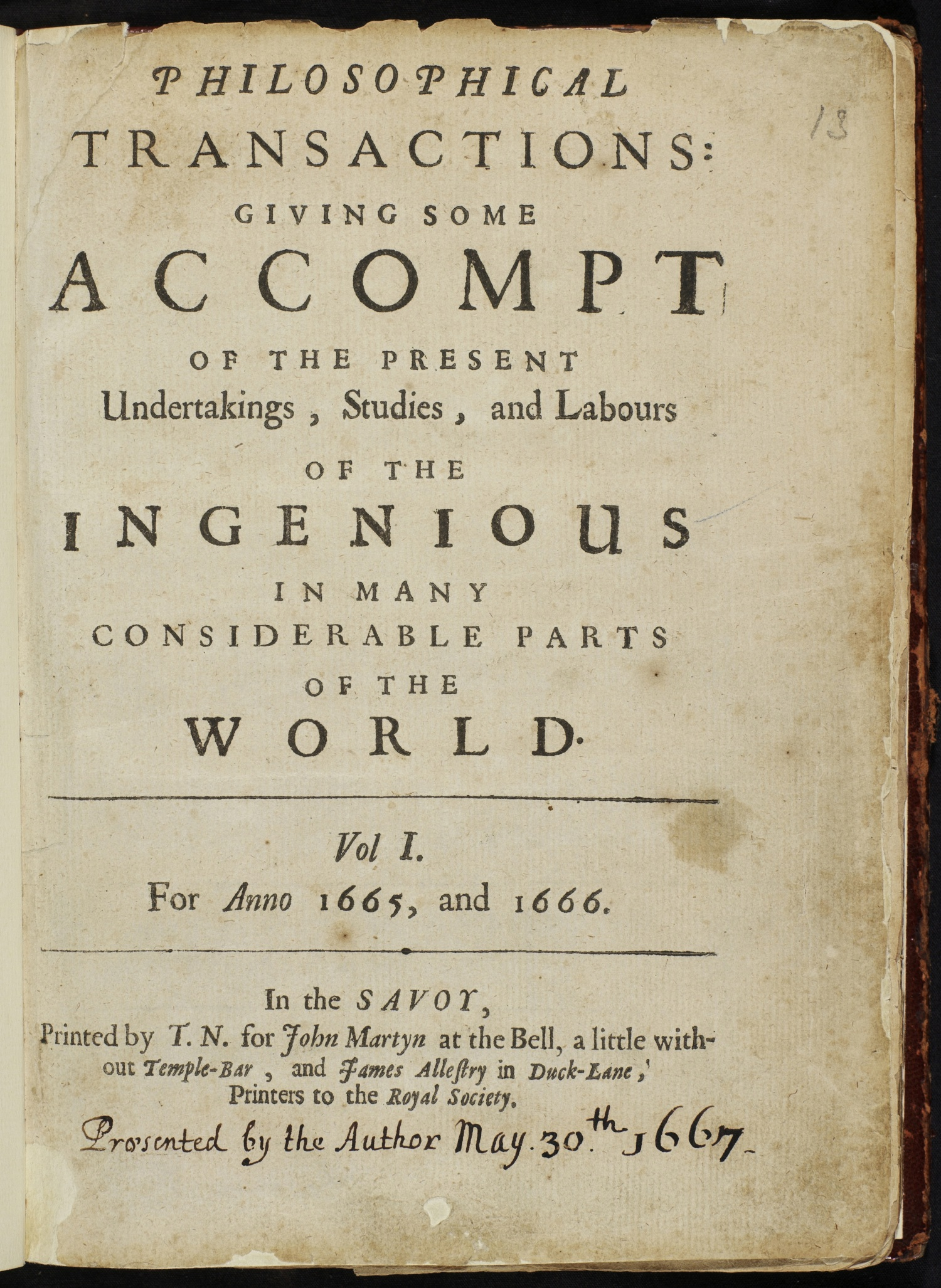
Title page of the first volume published in 1665

Philosophical Transactions of the Royal Society was established in 1665 by the Royal Society and is the oldest scientific journal in the English-speaking world. Henry Oldenburg was appointed as the first (joint) secretary to the society and he was also the first editor of the society's journal. In 1887 the journal expanded to become two separate publications, one serving the physical sciences, Philosophical Transactions of the Royal Society A: Mathematical, Physical and Engineering Sciences, and the other focusing on the life sciences, Philosophical Transactions of the Royal Society B: Biological Sciences. Nowadays, both journals publish themed issues and discussion meeting issues, while individual research articles are published in the sister journal Proceedings of the Royal Society.

The journal celebrated its 350th anniversary in 2015. To commemorate this event it published a special collection of commentaries on landmark papers from the archive by scientists such as Antonie van Leeuwenhoek, Hans Sloane and Alan Turing.
