= Antoine Deidier =

French physician

Antoine Deidier (born November 23, 1670 in Montpellier, died April 3, 1746 in Marseille) was a professor of medicine at the Faculty of Montpellier in Languedoc. A member of the mission sent to Marseille during the plague epidemic of 1720, he distanced himself from his colleagues by asserting the contagiousness of the plague using experimental approaches. After experiencing disgrace and oblivion, his reputation was rehabilitated at the end of the 20th century as his observations form a "pre-Pasteurian" germ theory of disease.

== Biography ==
=== Family and Career ===
The son of a Montpellier surgeon, Deidier began his studies in medicine in 1688, obtaining his medical doctorate in 1691. He later was named as Professor of Chemistry in the same institution from 1697 to 1732.

In 1697, he married Bernardine Vieussens, daughter of the famed anatomist Raymond Vieussens. That same year, he was also named professor of Chemistry. In 1711, he was named Assistant Physician of Saint Éloi Hospital, and later Chief of Medicine from 1715 to 1732.

In August of 1720, He was part of the medical mission sent to Marseille by the King to study the reality and nature of the plague affecting the city. This commission, headed by François Chicoyneau, was composed of six members of the Montpellier faculty. Initially the team believed that the infection was not caused the plague, not really the plague, but a non-contagious malignant fever. he came to believe through experimentation on human cadavers and live animals that the disease was caused by a contagious element. He refused to sign the reports that the rest of the team made that the plague was caused by poor living conditions. Upon returning to Montpellier in 1721, he pronounced bubonic plague to be caused by an infectious agent. In honor of his service to the king, he was awarded the title of "Conseiller-médecin du Roi" and made a Chevalier of the Order of St. Michael. He was an elected Fellow of the Royal Society in 1723.

In 1732, Chicoyneau was appointed first physician to the King, thus becoming the supreme authority on the organization of medicine in the kingdom. That same year, Chicoyneau used his power to remove Deidier from his professorship in Montpellier, and appointing him chief physician in Marseille. Deidier was not supported by any of his academic colleagues, however, the administrators of the hospital of Saint Éloi kept him as chief physician until 1737. He was physician to the galleys in Marseilles from 1732 to his death.

He died in Marseille on April 3, 1746.

== Works ==
In 1722, based on his experiences as a physician during an outbreak of the bubonic plaque in Marseilles, Deidier presented experiments to the Royal Society of Physicians on experiments he'd performed using bile extracted from the gallbladders of bodies infected with bubonic plague. These experiments included infecting dogs through injection and feeding of human bile. Deidier also undertook two experiments in which the bile of an infected dog is injected or rubbed into the wounds of healthy dogs. Half of these experiments result in the deaths of the dogs.

Following the plague outbreak, Antoine Deidier shifted in his practice to care for venereal diseases and published a work in 1723 dealing with syphilis, gonorrhea, and chancroid. The prevailing theory at the time of the publication was that the syphilis was a sort of corrosive acid which devoured the solid structures of the body and coagulated the humors. Deidier demonstrated that this idea was incorrect, as the acids act rapidly on tissues and do not possess an incubation period. Syphilis is slow acting with an incubation period. Deidier's alternate opinion was that the syphilitic virus was composed of tiny worms, which produced eggs by coupling. Deidier also noted the effectiveness of mercury in treating syphilis, believing it killed the worms.

Diedier observed that the tumors of syphilitic patients were cured more often than others and that prostitutes infected with syphilis had a lower frequency of cancer than the average population.

In 1754, Deidier published a three volume record of his observations in medicine
