= Richard Dixon (biologist) =

Distinguished Professor of Biology at the University of North Texas

Richard Dixon FRS
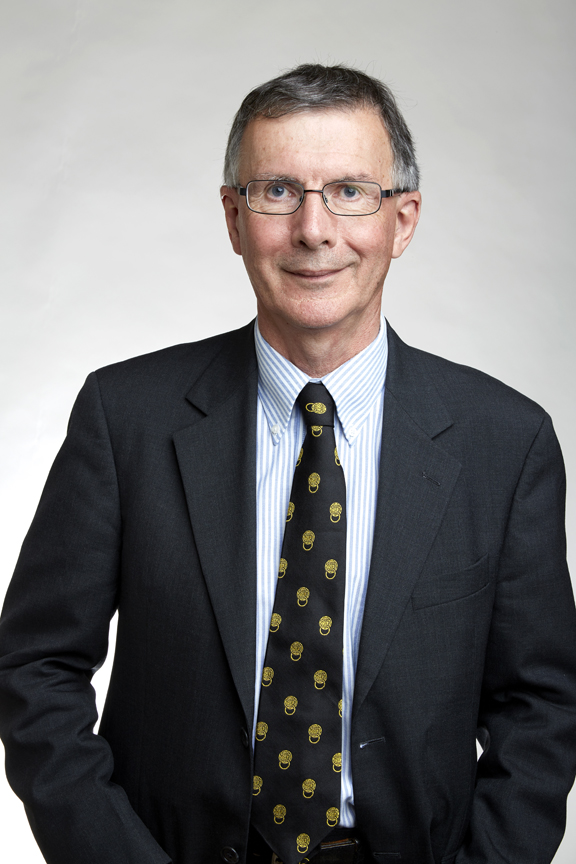
- Dixon in 2018
- Education: University of Oxford
- Awards: Member of the National Academy of Sciences
- Scientific career
- Workplaces: University of North Texas; Texas A&M University; University of Cambridge; Royal Holloway College
- Thesis: Phytoalexin production by plant tissue cultures (1976)
- Website: bdi.unt.edu/richard-dixon

Richard A. Dixon is a British biologist who is distinguished research professor at the University of North Texas, a faculty fellow of the Hagler Institute of Advanced Study and Timothy C. Hall-Heep distinguished faculty chair at Texas A&M University.

== Education ==
Dixon studied Biochemistry at the University of Oxford where he was awarded a Bachelor of Arts degree in 1973 followed by a Doctor of Philosophy degree in 1976 for research on the production of Phytoalexin by plant tissue cultures.

== Career and research ==
After completing his DPhil, Dixon conducted postdoctoral research at the University of Cambridge and subsequently established his own research group at Royal Holloway College,University of London. He later served as Director of the Plant Biology Division at the Samuel Roberts Noble Foundation in Ardmore, Oklahoma from 1998 to 2013. For over the past three decades Dixon has been recognized as a global leader in plant specialized metabolism. He has employed multidisciplinary strategies to decipher the biosynthetic and regulatory pathways leading to lignin and bioactive flavonoids, driving the field of metabolic engineering to develop more nutritious forages and bioenergy crops with enhanced traits for biorefining. His papers have been cited over 66,000 times.

From January 1, 2023 he has been Editor-in-Chief of Philosophical Transactions of the Royal Society B and he is also a member of the Editorial Board for PNAS.

=== Awards and honours ===
Dixon was elected a member of the National Academy of Sciences (NAS) of the United States. He is also a Fellow of the American Association for the Advancement of Science, the National Academy of Inventors and the American Society of Plant Biologists (ASPB). He was elected a Fellow of the Royal Society (FRS) in 2018.

Dixon has been recognized as a Pioneer Member of the American Society of Plant Biologists.
