= William Charles Evans =

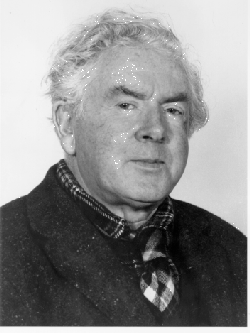
- Born: 1 October 1911; Penrhos
- Died: 24 July 1988 (aged 76); Llangaffo
- Education: Bangor University Manchester University

Professor William Charles Evans F.R.S. (1 October 1911 – 24 July 1988) was an eminent biochemist who spent most of his career at the University College of North Wales, Bangor. In 1979, he was elected a Fellow of the Royal Society, mainly for his research into the microbal degradation of aromatic compounds. His work is basic to our knowledge of nature's cycles and how nature responds to pollution, e.g. oil spill or weed-killer spray. This was his major scientific contribution though he was well known in Wales for his work on the poisonous substances in ferns.

== Early life ==
Charles Evans was born 1 October 1911 in Bethel, near Caernarfon, Gwynedd, the third son of the five children of Robert and Elizabeth Evans; the father was a stonemason at Dinorwic quarry. After receiving his early education at Bethel primary school and Caernarfon Central and grammar schools, he won the John Hughes Exhibition to Bangor University where he graduated with first-class honours in chemistry in 1931 and continued to study a Masters at the university.

== Career ==
After graduating from Bangor University, Charles Evans subsequently moved to Manchester University for postgraduate studies and was awarded his PhD in 1937 for work on tyrosinases in plant and animal tissues. In 1937, he was appointed to a lectureship at Leeds University where his head of department, Dr. Frank Happold, introduced him to bacteria and to their ability to metabolise aromatic compounds: this was to form the basis of his most important later work. In 1951 he returned to Bangor as Professor of Agricultural Chemistry (later changed to Biochemistry & Soil Science). Here he anticipated many ecological concerns about pollution caused by the release of man-made compounds into the environment 20 years before the rest of society.

== Honours and awards ==
Charles Evans was elected a Fellow of the Royal Society in 1979. He was awarded the honour from two main research areas: the education of the biochemistry of the aerobic and anaerobic pathways of the catabolism of aromatic compounds in Nature, and the isolation of the toxic factors in bracken fern causing the poisoning of farm animals.

== Personal life ==
In 1942, while he was in Leeds, he married Dr Irene Antice Woods, herself a gifted scientist; they had four children.

Evans was a native Welsh speaker and did not begin to learn English until about ten years old. He realised the importance for the survival of the Welsh language of its being used as a medium for scientific communication and served as Honorary President of Y Gymdeithas Wyddonol Genedlaethol (the National Scientific Society).

Evans died in 1988, on his farm in Llangaffo, Anglesey. Following his death in 1988, the journal Y Gwyddonydd ("The Scientist") published a memorial, an autobiography titled 'Portrait of a Welsh scientist' which he had drafted for it shortly before he died.
