= Thomas Egan (physician) =

Irish physician

- Born: 1752
- Died: 1818 (aged 65–66)
- Occupation: Physician

Thomas Egan (1752–1818) was an 18th-century Irish physician. He was born in Dunblaney, parish of Dunmore in the Diocese of Tuam, County Galway. He came from an ancient Catholic family who were brehons (judges), and had a law school at their home, Park Castle, near Tuam. His uncle, Boetius Egan, was archbishop of Tuam. Showing unusual ability at an early age, he was tutored at home and sent to study medicine at Montpellier University from which he graduated with a doctorate in 1775; his thesis was entitled "De arthritide" (About Arthritis).

He first practised medicine in Galway, where he married Sarah Gibbon, a choice that was not approved by his friends and led to their relocation to Dublin in about 1793. There he made an important contribution to the city's hospitals and to the establishment of St Patrick's College, Maynooth, where he was a professor. In 1806, he was elected Physician to the Meath Hospital. Dr. Egan was elected a member of the Royal Irish Academy 23 July 1791 and elected a Fellow of the Royal Society of London 4 April 1811.

He read a paper to the Academy on 6 March 1805 entitled "Experimental Inquiry into the Nature of Gravelly and Calculus Concretions, in the Human Subject; and the effects of Alkaline and Acid Substances on Them, in and out of the Body." Egan had been a physician for several years at the Cork Street Fever Hospital and Simpson's Hospital and had been conducting experiments on urinary diseases since 1799. Dr. Egan and his family lived in Sackville Street (now O'Connell Street). He died in December 1818 in Mullingar presumably while visiting his daughter who had married Captain Henry Faunt. Egan's son, Thomas Henry Egan, and his grandson, John Cruice Egan, were also prominent Dublin physicians.
