= Trevor Evans (scientist) =

British physical scientist

Trevor Evans (26 April 1927 — 10 October 2010) was a British physical scientist who specialised in the properties of diamonds.

Evans grew up in Wales. Following national service in the RAF, he moved to the University of Bristol to study physics. He later took up a research fellowship at the University of Reading, where he would become head of the physics department and where his research career would be based. His work was supported by De Beers, a firm for which Evans acted as a consultant.

He was elected fellow of the Institute of Physics in 1962, and fellow of the Royal Society in 1988.
