= Stephen Luke =

English physician

- Born: 1763; Penzance, Cornwall
- Died: 30 March 1829 (aged 65–66); London
- Occupation: Physician

Stephen Luke (1763 – 30 March 1829) was an English physician.

== Early life ==
Luke second son of Stephen Luke, was born at Penzance, Cornwall, in 1763. He was sent to the school of the Rev. James Parker, was then apprenticed to Richard Moyle, apothecary, of Marazion, and subsequently studied medicine in London and Paris for three years, becoming a member of the Corporation of Surgeons. After a short period of practice in London he returned to Cornwall and practised at Helston. He obtained the degree of M.D. from the University of Aberdeen, 24 June 1792.

== Career ==
Luke settled as a physician at Falmouth, where he soon attained a large practice and was elected mayor in 1797. He was captain of the Pendennis volunteer cavalry in the same year and the original promoter of the Pendennis artillery volunteers. He became an extra-licentiate of the Royal College of Physicians 23 July 1806. He entered in 1808 at Jesus College, Cambridge, and in 1811 took a house in Exeter for a short stay. Practice, however, came to him, and he stayed there nearly four years. He was admitted a licentiate of the College of Physicians 26 June 1815, and took a house in Cavendish Square, London. He graduated M.B. at Cambridge later in 1815 and M.D. in 1821. In 1828 he was made physician extraordinary to George IV. He died in London 30 March 1829. He married Harriot, daughter of Philip Puron Vyvyan of Tresmarrow, South Petherwin.

Luke contributed an essay on nitrous acid in dropsy to Thomas Beddoes's ‘Contributions to Physical and Medical Knowledge,’ 1799. In this he describes a single case of cirrhosis of the liver in which, after tapping, nitrous acid was of use as a diuretic. He also added ‘Observations on the Diseases of Cornwall’ to Richard Polwhele's ‘History of Cornwall,’ 1806.
