= Edward Forster (writer) =

English cleric and writer

Edward Forster FRS FSA (1769–1828) was an English cleric and miscellany writer.

== Life ==
Forster was born at Colchester, Essex, on 11 June 1769, the only son of Nathaniel Forster, D.D., rector of All Saints in that town. After receiving some instruction at home, he was sent to Norwich grammar school, then under his father's close friend Samuel Parr. On 5 May 1788 he matriculated at Balliol College, Oxford.

To renew contact with Parr, Forster took a house at Hatton, Warwickshire, where he resided for some time. Having married, he ultimately became a member of St. Mary Hall, Oxford, where he graduated B.A. on 21 February 1792, and entered Lincoln's Inn on 15 June of the same year. Deciding, however, to become a clergyman, he was ordained priest by Beilby Porteus, bishop of London, in 1796. He proceeded M.A. on 16 February 1797.

In 1803, Forster was presented to the rectory of Aston Somerville, Gloucestershire, by an old friend, Lord Somerville, who had procured for him the appointment of chaplain to the Duke of Newcastle in 1796. There was no parsonage-house on the living, and Forster settled in London, where his pulpit oratory was in demand. He was from 1800 to 1814 successively morning preacher at Berkeley and Grosvenor chapels; and at Park Street and King Street chapels, in which he shared the duty with Sydney Smith, Stanier Clarke, Thomas Frognall Dibdin, and other fashionable preachers.

After the peace of 1815 Forster moved with his family to Paris, his finances having suffered by losses on his publications. About a year later he began to preach in the Temple Protestant de l'Oratoire du Louvre, and eventually obtained a grant from the consistory for the use of the church when it was not required for French service. Here he officiated until the autumn of 1827, when ill-health compelled him to resign. In 1818, he was appointed to the post, founded at his suggestion, of chaplain to the British embassy, which he continued to hold until his death. In 1824, the Earl of Bridgewater made him his chaplain.

Forster had been elected Fellow of the Royal Society on 10 December 1801, and Fellow of the Society of Antiquaries of London. He was also an active supporter of the Royal Institution from its foundation, was appointed honorary librarian by the directors, and was engaged to deliver lectures there during three successive seasons.

== Death and burial ==
Forster died in Paris on 18 February 1828, after a lingering illness, and was buried in Père Lachaise Cemetery.

== Works ==
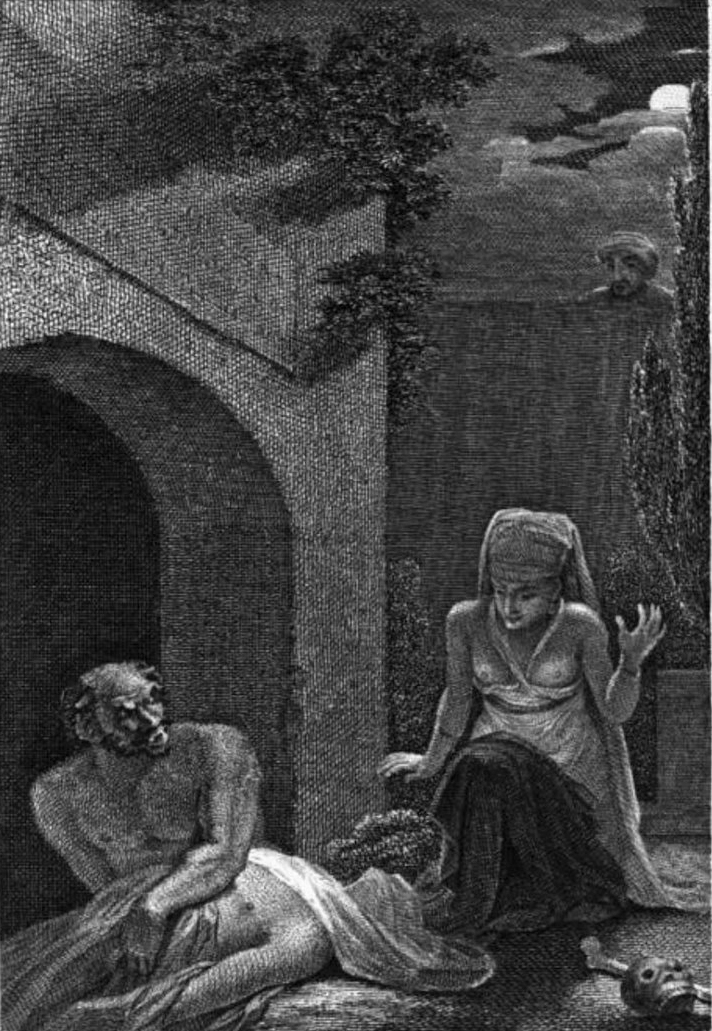
Engraving after Robert Smirke for Edward Forster's translation of the Arabian Nights

Forster entered into an engagement with a bookseller, William Miller of Old Bond Street, subsequently of Albemarle Street, to issue tastefully printed editions of the works of standard authors, illustrated by the best artists of the day. His first venture was an edition of Charles Jervas's translation of Don Quixote (1801). Having been successful in this, he published some lesser works of less importance, while he was preparing for the press a new translation, from the French of Antoine Galland, of the Arabian Nights (1802), with twenty-four engravings from pictures by Robert Smirke, R.A. During the same year he brought out an edition of Anacreon, for which William Bulmer furnished a Greek font; the title-plates and vignettes were by Lavinia Forster. Editions of dramatic authors followed, under the titles of British Drama, New British Theatre, and English Drama. An edition of Rasselas, with engravings by Abraham Raimbach from pictures painted by Smirke, was issued by Forster in 1805; it was followed in 1809 by a small privately printed volume of verse, entitled Occasional Amusements, which appeared without his name.

Forster's major publication was the folio serial entitled The British Gallery of Engravings, consisting of highly finished line engravings. Descriptions in English and French accompany each engraving. The first number of this work appeared in 1807, and in 1813 the first volume only was completed, when it was abandoned for financial reasons.

When he left for Paris, Forster was engaged in publishing a Plautus. Three volumes were completed when it was stopped by the sudden death of the printer.

== Family ==
Towards the end of 1790 Forster married Elizabeth, widow of Captain Addison, and youngest daughter of Philip Bedingfeld of Ditchingham Hall, Norfolk; his wife, by whom he had no children, lived only four years after their union. On 3 August 1799, then resident at Weston, Oxfordshire, he married as his second wife Lavinia, only daughter of Thomas Banks, R.A., the sculptor. He left a widow and three daughters, for whose benefit were published Sermons preached at the Chapel of the British Embassy, and at the Protestant Church of the Oratoire, in Paris, by Edward Forster, with a short Account of his Life, edited by Lavinia Forster, 2 vols. Paris, 1828.
