= John Davy (chemist) =

British physician and chemist (1790–1868)

John Davy FRS FRSE
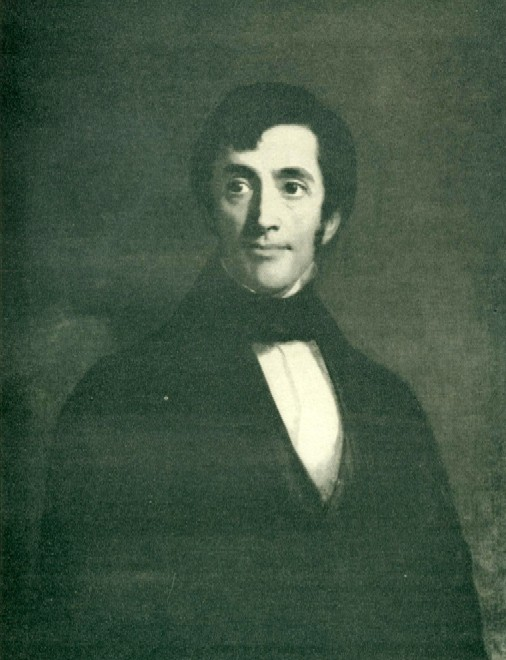
- Portrait of John Davy
- Born: 24 May 1790; Penzance, Cornwall, England
- Died: 24 January 1868 (aged 77); Lasketh-How, England
- Education: University of Edinburgh
- Known for: Phosgene
- Scientific career
- Fields: Chemistry

John Davy FRS FRSE (24 May 1790 – 24 January 1868) was a Cornish medical doctor, amateur chemist, brother of the noted chemist Sir Humphry Davy, and cousin of Edmund Davy.

During his career, Davy discovered phosgene, silicon tetrafluoride, and concluded that chlorine was an element.

== Early life and education ==
John Davy was born in Penzance, Cornwall, on 24 May 1790, the son of Robert Davy and his wife, Grace Millet.

He assisted his older brother Humphry at the Royal Institution of Great Britain for two years before heading to Edinburgh University, where he earned his degree in medicine in 1814.

== Career ==
In 1812, Davy discovered phosgene, a compound he also named. At the same time, he concluded that chlorine was an element. He also discovered silicon tetrafluoride.

Upon qualification as a doctor in 1815, Davy joined the British Army Medical Department as an Army Hospital Assistant. From 1816 until 1820 he worked as Staff Surgeon in the General Hospital in Brussels. After being posted to a number of British colonies, including India and Ceylon, he was elevated to the rank of Inspector General of Army Hospitals in the West Indies in 1862, based around Barbados.

In 1834 he was elected a Fellow of the Royal Society. From 1836 to 1840 he produced nine volumes on the collected works of his brother. In 1842 he was elected a Fellow of the Royal Society of Edinburgh, his proposer being Thomas Charles Hope.

In 1863 he discovered that eggshells have about 8,000 pores that are large enough for oxygen to flow in and carbon dioxide to flow out by pumping pressurized air into an underwater egg and watching thousands of tiny bubbles appear on the surface of the shell.

== Death ==
Davy returned to England, and moved to the Lake District where he died at Lasketh-How near Ambleside on 24 January 1868.

== Selected writings ==
- Davy, John (1821). An Account of the Interior of Ceylon, and of Its Inhabitants: With Travels in that Island. London: Longman, Hunt, Rees, Orme, and Brown. "john davy."
- Davy, John (1839). Researches, physiological and anatomical. London: Smith, Elder, and Company. "john davy."
- Davy, John (1839–1840). The Collected Works of Sir Humphry Davy. Bristol: Thoemmes Press.- published in nine volumes
- Davy, John (1855). The Angler and His Friend: Or, Piscatory Colloquies and Fishing Excursions. London: Longman, Brown, Green, and Longmans. "john davy."

For Rees's Cyclopædia he contributed articles about Chemistry, but the topics are not known.
