= Edmund Davy =

British chemist (1785–1857)

Edmund Davy FRS
- Born: 1785; Penzance, Cornwall, United Kingdom
- Died: 5 November 1857
- Known for: Discovery of acetylene; Platinum fulminate
- Scientific career
- Fields: Chemistry

Edmund Davy FRS (1785 – 5 November 1857) was a professor of chemistry at the Royal Cork Institution from 1813 and at the Royal Dublin Society from 1826. He discovered acetylene, as it was later named by Marcellin Berthelot. He was also an original member of the Chemical Society, and a member of the Royal Irish Academy.

== Family and early life ==
Edmund Davy was a cousin of Humphry Davy, the famous chemist who invented the Davy lamp for the safety of miners.

Edmund, the son of William Davy, was born in Penzance, Cornwall, and lived there throughout his teen years. He moved to London in 1804 to spend eight years as operator and assistant to Humphry Davy in the Royal Institution laboratory, which he kept in order. For a large part of that time, Edmund was also superintendent of the Royal Society's mineralogical collection. When, in October 1807, Humphry accomplished the electrolytic preparation of potassium and saw the minute globules of the quicksilver-like metal burst through the crust and take fire, Edmund described that his cousin was so delighted with this achievement that he danced about the room in ecstasy.

Humphry Davy's younger brother, Dr. John Davy, (24 May 1790 – 24 Jan 1868) also was a chemist who spent some time (1808–1811) assisting Humphry in his chemistry research at the Royal Institution. John was the first to prepare and name phosgene gas.

Edmund William Davy (born in 1826), son of Edmund Davy, became professor of medicine in the Royal College, Dublin, in 1870. That they cooperated in research is shown in a notice to the Royal Irish Academy on the manufacture of sulphuric acid which Edmund Davy ends with an acknowledgement of the assistance he received in his experiments given by his son, Edmund William Davy.

== Major discoveries ==
=== Spongy platinum ===
Edmund Davy was the first to discover a spongy form of platinum with remarkable gas absorptive properties. Justus Liebig later prepared this in a purer form able to absorb up to 250 times its volume of oxygen gas. Further, Edmund Davy discovered that even at room temperature, finely divided platinum would light up from heat in the presence of a mixture of coal gas and air. In another such experiment, in 1820, he found that with the platinum, alcohol vapours were converted to acetic acid. (Humphry Davy had discovered a few years earlier that a hot platinum wire lit up in a mixture of coal gas and air.) This release of energy from oxidation of the compounds, without flame, and without change in the platinum itself, was a sign of the catalytic property of platinum investigated later by Johann Döbereiner and other chemists.

=== Corrosion ===
In 1829, Edmund Davy found that the use of zinc blocks would prevent corrosion of the iron structure of buoys.

In the Report of the British Association for 1835 he was the first to publish a series of experiments investigating the protective power of zinc employed in simple contact and in massive form. Shortly thereafter a French engineer, M. Sorel, secured a patent for a process of coating an iron surface with fluid zinc to protect against rust, and the technique was adopted by manufacturers of galvanized iron. Davy claimed priority of discovery, but it was found that a patent had long before been issued, on 26 September 1791 to Madame Leroi de Jancourt for the protection of metals with a coating of an alloy of zinc, bismuth and tin (though without a knowledge of the chemical principles involved).

This is an example of cathodic protection, an electrochemical technique developed in 1824 by Humphry Davy to prevent galvanic corrosion. He had recommended that the Admiralty should attach iron blocks to protect the copper sheathing on the hulls of Navy vessels. (The method was shortly discontinued because of an unfortunate side effect - the speed of the ships was reduced by increased fouling by marine life. The protective method reduced the release of copper ions that had otherwise poisoned the organisms and controlled their growth.)

=== Electrochemistry ===
Edmund Davy made a series of experiments to detect the presence of metallic poisons by means of electricity, as a test of the presence of poisonous substances in cases of suspected poisoning. He applied a current of electricity to precipitate the salts of various metallic poisons from a prepared solution. The method was valuable because the result was not affected by the presence of organic matter from the contents of the stomach. When used as a test, Davy claimed that the presence of only 1/2500th part of a grain of arsenic could be discovered.

=== Acetylene ===
In 1836, Edmund Davy discovered a gas which he recognised as "a new carburet of hydrogen." It was an accidental discovery while attempting to isolate potassium metal. By heating potassium carbonate with carbon at very high temperatures, he produced a residue of what is now known as potassium carbide, (K_{2}C_{2}), which reacted with water to release the new gas. (A similar reaction between calcium carbide and water was subsequently widely used for the manufacture of acetylene.)

In the paper he read to the British Association at Bristol, Davy anticipated the value of acetylene as an illuminating gas: "From the brilliance with which the new gas burns in contact with the atmosphere it is, in the opinion of the author, admirably adapted for the purpose of artificial light, if it can be procured at a cheap rate."

Thereafter it was forgotten until Marcellin Berthelot rediscovered this hydrocarbon compound in 1860, for which he coined the name "acetylene."

=== Chemistry in agriculture ===
Davy was active in promoting scientific knowledge, whereby popular courses of lectures were established throughout Ireland. In some of his own lectures at the Royal Dublin Society, Davy showed his special interest in the applications of chemistry in agriculture. He published several papers concerning manures and chemical aids useful to farmers. These included "An Essay on the Use of Peat or Turf as a Means of Promoting Public Health and the Agriculture of the United Kingdom" (1850), and "An account of some Experiments made to determine the relative deodorizing Powers of Peat-charcoal, Peat, and Lime" (1856).

He also studied the uptake of arsenic by crops from artificial manures chemically prepared with sulphuric acid in which it was not usual to have arsenic as an impurity. Testing the growth of plants, he found "that arsenic might be taken up in considerable quantities by plants without destroying their vitality, or appearing even to interfere with their proper functions." He understood that arsenic was a cumulative poison, and that with continued consumption the "substance may collect in the system till its amount may exercise an injurious effect on the health of men and animals."
