= Nathaniel Forster (scholar) =

Nathaniel Forster D.D. (1718–1757) was an English cleric, and a classical and biblical scholar.

== Life ==
Forster was born on 3 February 1718 at Stadscombe, in the parish of Plymstock, Devon, of which his father, Robert Forster, was then minister. His mother was Elizabeth, daughter of the Rev. John Tindal, vicar of Cornwood in the same county. She was sister of the Rev. Nicholas Tindal, translator of Rapin's History of England, and niece of Dr. Matthew Tindal, author of Christianity as Old as the Creation. He received a basic education at Plymouth, where his father had moved on being appointed lecturer of St. Andrew's Church. After time at the grammar school of that town under the Rev. John Bedford, he was sent in 1732 to Eton, and at the same time entered at Pembroke College, Oxford, in order to entitle him to the benefit of an exhibition of £40 a year. He spent about sixteen months at Eton, and then went to his college at Oxford, where he became a pupil of Dr. Radcliff. On 13 June 1733 he was admitted scholar of Corpus Christi College, Oxford. He proceeded B.A. in 1735, and M.A. 10 February 1738–9, was elected a fellow of Corpus in 1739, and graduated B.D. in 1746 and D.D. in 1750.

In 1749 Forster was presented by Lord-chancellor Hardwicke, on the recommendation of Thomas Secker, to the small rectory of Hethe, Oxfordshire. In 1750 he became domestic chaplain to Joseph Butler; bishop Butler died in his arms at Bath, Somerset. Forster returned to his college for a short time, and in July 1752 was appointed one of the chaplains to Thomas Herring, archbishop of Canterbury. In the autumn of 1754 the archbishop gave him the valuable vicarage of Rochdale, Lancashire. Not popular at Rochdale, Forster did not stay long. The lord chancellor promoted him on 1 February 1754–5 to a prebendal stall in Bristol Cathedral.

On 1 May 1755 Forster was elected a fellow of the Royal Society, and on 12 May 1756 he was sworn one of the chaplains to George II. In the summer of 1757 he was, through the interest of Viscount Royston, appointed by Sir Thomas Clarke to succeed Richard Terrick as preacher at the Rolls Chapel. In August the same year he married Susan, widow of John Balls of Norwich, a lady possessed of fortune. Forster took a house in Craig's Court, Charing Cross, about two months before his death, which took place on 20 October 1757. He was buried in St Martin's Church, Westminster. His widow (who later married Philip Bedingfeld of Ditchingham, Norfolk) erected a monument to his memory in Bristol Cathedral. It is inscribed with a Latin epitaph composed by Thomas Hayter, then bishop of Norwich.

== Works ==
Forster was a scholar, and conversant with Greek, Latin, and Hebrew. He published:

- Reflections on the Natural Foundation of the high Antiquity of Government, Arts, and Sciences in Egypt, Oxford, 1743.
- Platonis Dialogi quinque. Recensuit, notisque illustravit Nathan. Forster, Oxford, 1745, reprinted 1765.
- Appendix Liviana; continens, (I.) Selectas codicum MSS. et editionum antiquarum lectiones, præcipuas variorum Emendationes, et supplementa lacunarum in iis T. Livii, qui supersunt libris. (II.) I. Freinshemii supplementorum libros X in locum decadis secundæ Livianæ deperditæ, Oxford, 1746.
- Popery destructive of the Evidence of Christianity, a sermon on Mark vii. 13, preached before the university of Oxford on 5 Nov. 1746, Oxford; reprinted in The Churchman Armed, vol. ii. (1814).
- A Dissertation upon the Account supposed to have been given of Jesus Christ by Josephus. Being an attempt to show that this celebrated passage, some slight corruptions only excepted, may be esteemed genuine, 1749.
- Biblia Hebraica sine punctis, Oxford, 1750.
- Remarks on the Rev. Dr. Stebbing's "Dissertation on the Power of States to deny Civil Protection to the Marriages of Minors", &c., London, 1755. Reply to Henry Stebbing.
