= List of fellows of the Royal Society W, X, Y, Z =

About 8,000 fellows have been elected to the Royal Society of London since its inception in 1660.

Below is a list of people who are or were Fellow or Foreign Member of the Royal Society. The date of election to the fellowship follows the name. Dates in brackets relate to an award or event associated with the person. The Society maintains a complete online list. This list is complete up to and including 2019.

List of fellows and foreign members of the Royal Society
A, B, C	D, E, F	G, H, I	J, K, L	M, N, O	P, Q, R	S, T, U, V	W, X, Y, Z

== List of fellows ==
=== W ===
Names	Election date	Notes
Conrad Hal Waddington	1947-03-20	8 November 1905 – 26 September 1975
Kenneth Wade	1989-03-16	13 October 1932 – 16 March 2014 Chemist
Walter Wade	1811-03-14	c. 1740 – 12 July 1825
Darashaw Nosherwan Wadia	1957-03-21	25 October 1883 – 15 June 1969
Harold William Taylor Wager	1904-05-05	11 March 1862 – 17 November 1929
Lawrence Rickard Wager	1946-03-21	5 February 1904 – 30 November 1965
William Wagstaffe	1718-03-13	1685 – 5 May 1725
Ralph Louis Wain	1960-03-24	29 May 1911 – 14 December 2000
Gabriel Waksman	2012-04-19	
Richard Irving Walcott	1991-03-14	c. 1933
Nicholas John Wald	2004-05-27	31 May 1944
James Waldegrave, 2nd Earl Waldegrave	1749-12-14	14 March 1715 – 28 April 1763
Herman Waldmann	1990-03-15	27 February 1945
David J. Wales	2016-04-29	1963 Chemical physicist
William Wales	1776-11-07	c. 1734 – 29 December 1798
Alan Walker	1999-05-13	23 August 1938 – 20 November 2017
Arthur Geoffrey Walker	1955-03-17	17 July 1909 – 31 March 2001
Charles Vincent Walker	1855-06-07	1812 – 24 December 1882
David Alan Walker	1979-03-15	18 August 1928 – 12 February 2012
Donald Walker	1985-03-21	Professor
Edward Walker	1869-06-03	14 September 1820 – 2 March 1893 Schoolmaster
Fowler Walker	1791-03-31	c. 1732 – 20 August 1804
George Walker	1771-05-30	c. 1734 – 21 April 1807
George P. L. Walker	1975-03-20	2 March 1926 – 17 January 2005
George Walker Walker	1913-05-01	24 February 1874 – 6 September 1921
Gilbert Thomas Walker	1904-05-05	14 June 1868 – 4 November 1958
James Walker	1900-06-14	6 April 1863 – 6 May 1935
James Walker	1828-04-17	14 September 1781 – 8 October 1862
James Walker	1774-06-09	c. 1720 – 22 February 1789
James Thomas Walker	1865-06-01	1 December 1826 – 16 February 1896 Surveyor General of India
John Walker	1794-03-27	d 9 May 1824
John Ernest Walker	1995-03-09	7 January 1941
John James Walker	1883-06-07	2 October 1825 – 15 February 1900
Miles Walker	1931-05-07	13 August 1868 – 22 January 1941
Robert Walker	1831-03-03	c. 1801 – 28 September 1865 Wadham College
Thomas Walker	1791-05-05	died c. 1800 Accountant General
Thomas Walker	1730-01-22	? September 1702 – 17 September 1764 Barrister
William Walker	1738-02-09	14 October 1742 Ship's captain
Charles Baring Wall	1830-04-01	c. 1795 – 14 October 1853
Charles Terence Clegg Wall	1969-03-20	14 December 1936
Martin Wall	1788-05-08	1747 – 21 June 1824
Patrick David Wall	1989-03-16	5 April 1925 – 8 August 2001
Richard Wall	1753-05-31	1694–1778 Diplomat
Alfred Russel Wallace	1893-06-01	8 January 1823 – 7 November 1913
David James Wallace	1986-03-20	7 October 1945 Physicist
Thomas Wallace	1953-03-19	5 September 1891 – 2 February 1965 Horticulturalist
Augustus Desiré Waller	1892-06-02	12 July 1856 – 11 March 1922
Augustus Volney Waller	1851-06-05	21 December 1816 – 18 September 1870
Edmund Waller	1663-05-20	3 March 1606 – 21 October 1687 Original Fellow
Richard Waller	1681-04-27	c. 1646 – ? January 1715 Botanist
William Waller	1679-02-20	c. 1639 – 18 July 1699 Soldier & MP
Nathaniel Wallich	1829-03-12	28 January 1786 – 28 April 1854
John Wallis	1663-05-20	23 November 1616 – 28 October 1703 Original Fellow
Sir Barnes Neville Wallis	1945-03-22	26 September 1887 – 30 October 1979
Daniel Frank Walls	1992-03-12	13 September 1942 – 12 May 1999
Charles Walmesley	1750-11-01	13 January 1722 – 25 November 1797
Ian Alexander Walmsley	2012-04-19	
Horatio Walpole, 3rd Earl of Orford	1824-03-04	14 June 1783 – 29 December 1858
Horatio Walpole, 4th Earl of Orford	1747-02-19	24 September 1717 – 2 March 1797
Spencer Horatio Walpole	1860-11-22	11 September 1806 – 22 March 1898
Mark Walport	2011-05-19	25 January 1953
Anthony Edward Walsby	1993-03-11	1941 – 14 April 2024 Biologist, Bristol Univ.
Alan Walsh	1969-03-20	19 December 1916 – 3 August 1998
Arthur Donald Walsh	1964-03-19	8 August 1916 – 23 April 1977
John Walsh	1770-11-08	1 July 1726 – 9 March 1795 Scientist
Francis Martin Rouse Walshe	1946-03-21	19 September 1885 – 21 February 1973
Robert Boyle-Walsingham	1778-03-05	1736 – October 1779
Henry Walter	1819-11-11	28 January 1785 – 25 January 1859 Clergyman
Johann Gottlieb Walter	1794-05-01	1 July 1734 – 4 January 1818 Anatomist, Frankfurt
Kenneth Walters	1991-03-14	14 September 1934 – 28 March 2022 Rheology, Univ. of Wales
William Walton	1837-05-25	d. 19 September 1863 Clergyman & meteorologist
Humfrey Wanley	1706-11-20	21 March 1672 – 6 July 1726
Olaus Warburg	1805-01-10	1805
Henry Warburton	1809-02-16	12 November 1784 – 16 September 1858
John Warburton	1834-04-10	c. 1793 – 2 June 1845 Physician
John Warburton	1720-03-10	28 February 1682 – 11 May 1759
Esay Ward	1668-02-20	c. 1629 – ? August 1674
Harry Marshall Ward	1888-06-07	21 March 1854 – 26 August 1906
Ian Macmillan Ward	1983-03-17	9 April 1928 – 5 November 2018 Physicist, Leeds Univ.
John Ward	1723-11-30	c. 1679 – 17 October 1758 Gresham Prof of Rhetoric
John Clive Ward	1965-03-18	1 August 1924 – 6 May 2000
John William Ward, 1st Earl of Dudley	1815-11-16	9 August 1781 – 6 March 1833
Nathaniel Bagshaw Ward	1852-06-03	1791 – 4 June 1868
Richard Samuel Ward	2005-05-26	6 September 1951 Mathematician, Durham Univ.
Seth Ward	1663-05-20	? April 1617 – 6 January 1689 Bishop Original Fellow
Patience Ward	1681-04-06	7 December 1629 – 10 July 1696
James Ware	1802-03-11	11 February 1756 – 13 April 1815 Ophthalmic Surgeon
Philip Frank Wareing	1969-03-20	27 April 1914 – ? 29 March 1996
Pehr Wilhelm Wargentin	1764-07-12	11 September 1717 – 13 December 1783
Edward Waring	1763-06-02	1734 – 15 August 1798
Richard Hill Waring	1769-02-16	c. 1721 – 11 October 1794 High Sheriff, Flintshire
Robert Warington	1864-06-02	7 September 1807 – ? 17 November 1867 Chemist, Soc. of Apothecaries
Robert Warington	1886-06-04	22 August 1838 – 20 March 1907 Agricultural Chemist, Rothamsted
David Lee Wark	2007-05-17	
Anne Elizabeth Warner	1985-03-21	25 August 1940 - 16 May 2012
Joseph Warner	1750-12-06	1717 – 24 July 1801
Frederick Edward Warner	1976-03-18	31 March 1910 – 3 July 2010
Mark Warner	2012-04-19	26 January 1952 – 24 December 2021
John Ashley Warre	1817-05-01	5 October 1787 – 18 November 1860
Charles Warren	1790-04-29	19 March 1764 – 12 August 1829 Barrister, MP for Dorchester
Charles Warren	1884-06-12	7 February 1840 – 21 January 1927
Graham Barry Warren	1999-05-13	
John Warren	1830-12-09	4 October 1796 – 16 August 1852 Clergyman and Mathematician
Pelham Warren	1813-04-08	7 October 1778 – 2 December 1835
Richard Warren	1764-03-08	? 4 December 1731 – 22 June 1797 Physician
Samuel Warren	1835-04-02	23 May 1807 – 29 July 1877
George Warrender	1815-06-08	5 December 1782 – 21 February 1849
Elizabeth Kerr Warrington	1986-03-20	
John Washington	1845-02-13	? 1800 – 16 September 1863
Michael Derek Waterfield	1991-03-14	Biochemist, UCL
Douglas Frew Waterhouse	1967-03-16	3 June 1916 – ? December 2000
Edward Waterhouse	1663-07-29	1619 – 30 May 1670 Clergyman
John Waterhouse	1834-02-06	3 August 1806 – 13 February 1879
John Conrad Waterlow	1982-03-18	13 June 1916 – 19 October 2010 Nutrition scientist, London Univ.
William Alexander Waters	1954-03-18	8 May 1903 – 28 January 1985 Chemist
Hugh Christian Watkins	2017-05-05	
Jeffrey Clifton Watkins	1988-03-17	Biochemist, Oxford Univ.
Thomas Watkins	1794-01-23	c. 1761 – 15 October 1829 Clergyman
Thomas Watkins	1714-11-30	fl 1714–1729 Mathematician
Winifred May Watkins	1969-03-20	6 August 1924 – 3 October 2003
Alan Andrew Watson	2000-05-11	Astrophysicist, Leeds
Andrew James Watson	2003-05-15	
David Meredith Seares Watson	1922-05-11	18 June 1886 – 23 July 1973
Frederick Beilby Watson	1818-11-12	1773 – 11 July 1852
George Neville Watson	1919-05-15	31 January 1886 – 2 February 1965
Henry Watson	1767-04-02	1793 Surgeon
Henry William Watson	1881-06-02	25 February 1827 – 11 January 1903
James Watson	1778-03-12	c. 1748 – 2 May 1796 Lawyer
James Kay Graham Watson	1987-03-19	20 April 1936 – 18 December 2020
Janet Vida Watson	1979-03-15	1 September 1923 – 29 March 1985
Jonathan Watson	1763-06-09	c. 1718 – November 1803
Morrison Watson	1884-06-12	? 1846 – 25 March 1885 Physician
Ralph Watson	1830-05-27	fl 1830–1835
Richard Watson	1769-02-02	August 1737 – 4 July 1816
Robert Watson	1751-02-07	c. 1720 – 2 March 1756
Robert Watson	2011-05-19	21 March 1948
Thomas Watson	1859-06-09	7 March 1792 – 11 December 1882 Physician
William Watson	1741-04-09	3 April 1715 – 10 May 1787 Chemist
William Watson	1767-12-10	? 28 August 1744 – c. 1825 Physician & Astronomer
William Watson	1808-04-07	c. 1759 – 1 June 1818 Sergeant-at-arms
William Watson	1901-06-06	4 August 1868 – 3 March 1919 Asst Prof of Physics, RCS, London
Robert Alexander Watson-Watt	1941-03-20	13 April 1892 – 5 December 1973
Charles Watson-Wentworth, 2nd Marquess of Rockingham	1751-11-07	13 May 1730 – 1 July 1782
Alexander Stuart Watt	1957-03-21	21 June 1892 – 2 March 1985
Fiona Mary Watt	2003-05-15	28 March 1956
James Watt	1785-11-24	19 January 1736 – 25 August 1819
James Watt	1820-12-07	5 February 1769 – 2 June 1848 Son of James Watt the engineer
William Watt	1976-03-18	14 April 1912 – 11 August 1985 Physical Chemist
Anthony Watts	2014-04-30	Geologist, Oxford University
Colin Watts	2005-05-26	Immunologist
Henry Watts	1866-06-07	20 January 1815 – 30 June 1884 Chemistry journalist
Philip Watts	1900-06-14	30 May 1846 – 15 March 1926
William Whitehead Watts	1904-05-05	7 June 1860 – 30 July 1947
Andrew Scott Waugh	1858-06-03	3 February 1810 – 21 February 1878
Arthur Goodall Wavell	1827-05-24	29 March 1785 – 10 July 1860
William Wavell	1824-02-05	d. 15 May 1829 Physician
Benjamin Way	1771-12-05	September 1740 – 22 August 1808 MP for Bridport
Lewis Way	1738-02-23	1698–1771
Dennis Lawrence Weaire	1999-05-13	17 October 1942
David John Weatherall	1977-03-17	9 March 1933 – 8 December 2018
Paul Egerton Weatherley	1973-03-15	6 May 1917 – 8 August 2001 Botanist, Aberdeen Univ.
Thomas Weaver	1826-03-09	1772 – 2 July 1855
Colin Edward Webb	1991-03-14	9 December 1937
Frederick Webb	1822-03-21	1853
Philip Barker Webb	1824-03-25	10 July 1793 – 31 August 1854
Philip Carteret Webb	1749-11-09	1700 – 22 June 1770
Robert Webb	1762-11-11	d. 9 September 1765
John Webb	1764-06-28	d. April 1797
Bryan Ronald Webber	2001-05-10	25 July 1943
William Webber	1766-06-05	d. 30 November 1796
John Webster	1844-03-07	1795 – 21 July 1876 Physician
Richard Everard Webster, Viscount Alverstone	1902-06-19	22 December 1842 – 15 December 1915
Robert Gordon Webster	1989-03-16	1932
Godfrey Webster	1786-05-18	c. 1749 – 3 June 1800
Thomas Webster	1847-03-18	16 October 1810 – 3 June 1875
Richard Weck	1975-03-20	5 March 1913 – 9 January 1986
Alexander Wedderburn, 1st Earl of Rosslyn	1787-12-06	13 February 1733 – 2 January 1805
Joseph Henry Maclagan Wedderburn	1933-05-11	26 February 1882 – 9 October 1948
Josiah Wedgwood	1783-01-16	? July 1730 – 3 January 1795
Basil Charles Leicester Weedon	1971-03-18	18 July 1923 – 10 October 2003
George Wegg	1758-02-09	25 August 1777
George Samuel Wegg	1777-11-13	c. 1750 – 4 January 1817 Barrister
Samuel Wegg	1753-05-31	17 November 1723 – 19 December 1802 Barriste, Governor of HBC
Christian Frederick Weichman	1728-06-27	24 August 1698 – 4 August 1770
Johann Friedrich Weidler	1732-11-09	? 23 April 1691 – 30 November 1755
Felix Jiri Weinberg	1983-03-17	
Lawrence Weiskrantz	1980-03-20	
Frederick Ernest Weiss	1917-05-03	2 November 1865 – 7 January 1953 Botanist
Nigel Oscar Weiss	1992-03-12	
Robin Anthony Weiss	1997-05-15	Virologist, UCL
Walter Weldon	1882-06-08	31 October 1832 – 20 September 1885
Walter Frank Raphael Weldon	1890-06-05	15 March 1860 – 13 April 1906
Walter Thompson Welford	1980-03-20	31 August 1916 – 18 September 1990
John Welin	1741-05-28	? 1705 – 31 January 1744 Finnish
Mark Edward Welland	2002-05-09	
Henry Solomon Wellcome	1932-05-26	21 August 1853 – 25 July 1936
Arthur Wellesley, 1st Duke of Wellington	1847-11-25	29 April 1769 – 14 September 1852
Alan Arthur Wells	1977-03-17	Engineer, Inventor of Wells Turbine
George Philip Wells	1955-03-17	17 July 1901 – 27 September 1985
Peter Neil Temple Wells	2003-05-15	
William Charles Wells	1793-11-07	24 May 1757 – 18 September 1817
James Raymond Wellsted	1837-04-06	1805 – 25 October 1842
Harry Lambert Welsh	1962-03-15	23 March 1910 – 23 July 1984
James Welsh	1770-03-15	c. 1723 – June 1778 Physician
John Welsh	1857-06-11	27 September 1824 – 11 May 1859 Supt. of Kew Observatory
Robert Welsted	1718-03-13	1671 – 1 February 1735 Physician
Thomas Francis Wenman	1779-01-21	18 November 1745 – 8 April 1796
Charles Wentworth-Fitzwilliam, 5th Earl Fitzwilliam	1811-01-17	4 May 1786 – 4 October 1857
William Wentworth, 2nd Earl of Strafford	1668-02-06	8 June 1626 – 16 October 1695
Charles Morley Wenyon	1927-05-12	24 March 1878 – 24 October 1948
Paul Gottlieb Werlhof	1736-02-26	24 March 1699 – 26 July 1767
Johann Georg Heinrich Graf von Werthern	1765-02-14	1735–1790
James West	1727-03-09	2 May 1703 – 2 July 1772
John West, 1st Earl De La Warr	1728-12-19	4 April 1693 – 16 March 1766
Peter Christopher West	2006-05-18	Theoretical Physics, King's College, London
Richard Gilbert West	1968-03-21	
Stephen Craig West	1995-03-09	Biochemist, Cancer Research
Thomas Summers West	1989-03-16	18 November 1927 – 9 January 2010 Chemist, Birmingham & Aberdeen Universities
William West	1846-02-19	1793 – 10 September 1851 Chemist
John Hugh Westcott	1983-03-17	
William Western	1721-11-30	? 1694 – 22 September 1729
Gerald Westheimer	1985-03-21	
Richard Westmacott	1837-05-25	1799 – 19 April 1872
Robert Grosvenor, 1st Marquess of Westminster	1841-06-10	22 March 1767 – 17 February 1845
Thomas Stanley Westoll	1952-03-20	3 July 1912 – 19 September 1995
Robert Weston	1767-05-28	1767–1797 FSA
Stephen Weston	1792-03-01	1747 – 8 January 1830 Clergyman
Edward Wetenhall	1683-07-04	7 October 1636 – 12 November 1713
Alan Marmaduke Wetherell	1971-03-18	31 December 1932 – 13 September 1998
Charles Wetherell	1824-12-16	1770 – 17 August 1846
Caspar Wetstein	1754-07-04	August 1760
Johann Jakob Wetstein	1753-04-05	5 March 1693 – 23 March 1754
Anthony de Wevelinchoven	1781-04-05	1789
John Weyland	1814-06-09	4 December 1774 – 8 May 1854
Thomas Whalley	1708-04-07	fl 1708
Richard Wharton	1810-07-12	c. 1765 – 13 October 1828 Barrister and MP
William James Lloyd Wharton	1886-06-04	2 March 1843 – 29 September 1905
Frederick Robert Whatley	1975-03-20	
James Whatman	1840-01-09	3 July 1813 – ? 12 March 1887
William Robert Whatton	1834-06-05	17 February 1790 – 5 December 1835
Charles Wheatstone	1836-01-21	February 1802 – 19 October 1875
David John Wheeler	1981-03-19	9 February 1927 – 13 December 2004
Robert Eric Mortimer Wheeler	1968-05-30	10 September 1890 – 22 July 1976 (Statute 12)
Michael John Whelan	1976-03-18	
William Joseph Whelan	1992-03-12	Biochemist, Miami
Granville Wheler	1728-06-27	August 1701 – 12 May 1770 Revd. Proved electric current.
George Wheler	1677-12-13	1650 – 15 January 1723 Clergyman and Scholar
William Whewell	1820-04-13	24 May 1794 – 6 March 1866
Paul Whichcote	1675-01-14	5 March 1643 – December 1721
Joseph Whidbey	1805-11-21	1755–1833
Richard Whiddington	1925-05-07	25 November 1885 – 7 June 1970
David Hardy Whiffen	1966-03-17	15 January 1922 – 2 December 2002
John Whishaw	1815-02-23	c. 1765 – 21 December 1840
Daniel Whistler	1663-05-20	1619 – 11 May 1684 Original Fellow
Thomas Dunham Whitaker	1818-06-11	8 June 1759 – 18 December 1821
William Whitaker	1887-06-09	4 May 1836 – 15 January 1925
Samuel Charles Whitbread	1854-06-01	16 February 1796 – 27 May 1879
Charles White	1762-02-18	4 October 1728 – 20 February 1813
Errol Ivor White	1956-03-15	30 June 1901 – 11 January 1985
Frederick William George White	1966-03-17	26 May 1905 – 17 August 1994
John White	1723-01-17	2 December 1699 – 7 September 1769
John Graham White	2005-05-26	Clinical psychologist, Liverpool
John William White	1993-03-11	
Michael James Denham White	1961-03-16	20 August 1910 – 16 December 1983
Nicholas John White	2006-05-18	Prof. of Tropical Medicine
Philip Bruce White	1941-03-20	29 December 1891 – 19 March 1949 Microbiologist
Richard White	1661-06-26	1661 Mathematician
Robert Stephen White	1994-03-10	
Simon David Manton White	1997-05-15	
Taylor White	1725-04-29	26 March 1772
Thomas White	1726-11-17	14 November 1754 Clerk of the Errors
Thomas White	1777-06-19	15 October 1724 – 28 February 1797 Ironmonger
William Archibald Armstrong White	1837-04-13	26 May 1776 – 7 December 1847 Barrister and Antiquarian
William Henry White	1808-11-10	fl 1808–1827
William Henry White	1888-06-07	2 February 1845 – 27 February 1913
Caleb Whitefoord	1784-06-24	1734 – February 1810
Alfred North Whitehead	1903-06-11	15 February 1861 – 30 December 1947
John Henry Constantine Whitehead	1944-03-16	11 November 1904 – 8 May 1960
John Whitehurst	1779-05-13	10 April 1713 – 18 February 1788
James Hunter Whitelaw	1996-03-14	28 January 1936 – 16 August 2006 Prof of Mechanical Eng., Imperial College
John Whiteside	1718-07-03	? October 1679 – ? 22 October 1729 Clergyman
Henry Whitfeld	1786-03-09	c. 1741–1813
Gerald Beresford Whitham	1965-03-18	Mathematician, Caltech
George Whitmore	1797-11-23	25 November 1805
John Macnaghten Whittaker	1949-03-17	7 March 1905 – 29 January 1984
Edmund Taylor Whittaker	1905-05-11	24 October 1873 – 24 March 1956
Ronald Whittam	1973-03-15	
Walter Frederick Whittard	1957-03-21	26 October 1902 – 2 March 1966
David Whitteridge	1953-03-19	22 June 1912 – 15 June 1994
Harry Blackmore Whittington	1971-03-18	24 March 1916 – 20 June 2010 Professor of Geology, Cambridge
Peter Whittle	1978-03-16	
Frank Whittle	1947-03-20	1 June 1907 – 9 August 1996
Joseph Whitworth	1857-06-11	21 December 1803 – 22 January 1887
Robert Whytlaw-Gray	1928-05-10	14 June 1877 – 21 January 1958
Robert Whytt	1752-04-16	6 September 1714 – 15 April 1766
Francois Wicardel, Chevalier de Fleury	1715-11-30	1715–1754
Kumar Wickramasinghe	2019-04-16	
John Churchill Wickstead	1716-04-05	May 1774
Elsie May Widdowson	1976-03-18	21 October 1906 – 14 June 2000
Samuel Edward Widdrington	1842-12-22	1787 – 11 January 1856 (Born Samuel Edward Cook)
Karel Frantisek Wiesner	1969-06-20	25 November 1919 – 28 November 1986
Vincent Brian Wigglesworth	1939-03-16	17 April 1899 – 11 February 1994
Robert Wight	1855-06-07	6 July 1796 – 26 May 1872
Dale Brian Wigley	2004-05-27	Scientist, Cancer Research
James Wigram	1835-04-02	5 November 1793 – 29 July 1866
Robert Wigram	1806-02-27	25 September 1773 – 1843
Samuel Wilberforce	1845-12-18	7 September 1805 – 19 July 1873
George Wilbraham	1821-03-08	8 March 1779 – 24 January 1852 MP for Stockbridge, Cheshire and Cheshire North
Roger Wilbraham	1782-02-28	c. 1744 – ? March 1829 MP for Bodmin
Thomas Wilbraham	1742-03-18	c. 1702 – 29 March 1782
Johann Karl Wilcke	1789-04-30	6 September 1732 – 18 April 1796
John Paul Wild	1970-03-19	
Henry Wilde	1886-06-04	? February 1833 – 29 March 1919
Andrew John Wiles	1989-03-16	
Wilhelmus Wilhelmius	1743-01-27	1720 – 27 December 1771
Israel Wilkes	1760-03-06	c. 1722 – 25 November 1805
John Wilkes	1749-04-13	17 October 1725 – 26 December 1797
Maurice Vincent Wilkes	1956-03-15	
Alex James Wilkie	2001-05-10	
Andrew Wilkie	2013-05-02	
Douglas Robert Wilkie	1971-03-18	2 October 1922 – 21 May 1998 Medical Research, UCL
John Wilkins	1663-04-22	1614 – 19 November 1672 Founder
Maurice Hugh Frederick Wilkins	1959-03-19	15 December 1916 – 5 October 2004
Charles Wilkins	1788-06-12	1749 – 13 May 1836
William Wilkins	1831-06-02	31 August 1778 – 31 August 1839
Guy Wilkinson	2018-05-09	
Geordie Williamson	2018-05-09	1981 –
James Hardy Wilkinson	1969-03-20	27 September 1919 – 5 October 1986
John Wilkinson	1764-06-28	c. 1819
Denys Haigh Wilkinson	1956-03-15	
Geoffrey Wilkinson	1965-03-18	14 July 1921 – 26 September 1996
John Gardner Wilkinson	1834-12-18	5 October 1797 – 29 October 1875
William Lionel Wilkinson	1990-03-15	Chemical Engineer (Nuclear Energy)
Mark Wilks	1826-02-23	c. 1760 – 19 September 1831
Samuel Wilks	1870-06-02	2 June 1824 – 8 November 1911
Robert Willan	1809-02-23	12 November 1757 – 12 April 1812
John Willett Willett	1774-12-08	26 September 1815
Ralph Willett	1764-06-21	1719 – 13 January 1795
David Willetts (Baron Willetts of Havant)	2018-05-09	9 March 1956 Honorary Fellow
Arthur Willey	1902-06-05	9 October 1867 – 26 December 1942
William Augustus, Duke of Cumberland	1760-12-04	15 April 1721 – 31 October 1765 Royal
William Charles Henry Friso, Prince of Orange	1734-03-07	1711 – 22 October 1751 Royal
William Frederick, 2nd Duke of Gloucester	1797-01-14	15 January 1776 – 30 November 1834 Royal
William Henry, 1st Duke of Gloucester	1780-01-10	14 November 1743 – 25 August 1805 Royal
William IV, King of Great Britain and Ireland	1831-03-10	21 August 1765 – 20 June 1837 Patron
Charles Williams-Wynn	1827-05-24	9 October 1775 – 2 September 1850
Watkin Williams-Wynn	1773-06-17	8 April 1749 – 29 July 1789
Alan Frederick Williams	1990-03-15	25 May 1945 – 9 April 1992
Alwyn Williams	1967-03-16	8 June 1921 – 4 April 2004
Carrington Bonsor Williams	1954-03-18	7 October 1889 – 12 July 1981
Charles Greville Hanson Williams	1862-06-05	22 September 1829 – 15 June 1910
Charles James Blasius Williams	1835-04-02	3 February 1805 – 24 March 1889
David Williams	1984-03-15	
Dionysius Williams	1766-05-08	? January 1733 – ? June 1775
Dudley Howard Williams	1983-03-17	
Evan James Williams	1939-03-16	8 June 1903 – 29 September 1945 Atomic Physics, Aberystwyth
Frederic Calland Williams	1950-03-16	26 June 1911 – 11 August 1977
James Gordon Williams	1994-03-10	
John Williams	1828-03-06	12 April 1778 – 11 August 1849
John Williams	1671-03-23	? September 1642 – ? November 1680 Baronet
John Lloyd Williams	1801-05-21	1801 Physician, Bengal
John Wesley Williams	1839-01-31	1788 – January 1841
Moses Williams	1719-11-05	2 March 1686 – 9 April 1742
Peter Michael Williams	1999-05-13	
Reeve Williams	1699-01-11	1682–1703
Richard Tecwyn Williams	1967-03-16	20 February 1909 – 29 December 1979
Robert Hughes Williams	1990-03-15	
Robert Joseph Paton Williams	1972-03-16	
Roger Williams	1664-02-03	? 1665
Roger L. Williams	2017-05-05	
Stephen Williams	1734-06-13	c. 1701–1741
Thomas Williams	1858-06-03	4 January 1819 – 23 April 1865 Physician
Timothy John Williams	2012-04-19	
Alexander William Williamson	1855-06-07	1 May 1824 – 6 May 1904
Benjamin Williamson	1879-06-12	9 January 1827 – 3 January 1916 Irish mathematician
David Theodore Nelson Williamson	1968-03-21	15 February 1923 – 10 May 1992 Electronic Engineer
John Williamson	1749-06-15	1713 – 25 February 1763 Chaplain in Lisbon
Joseph Williamson	1663-05-20	25 July 1633 – 3 October 1701 Original Fellow
Robert Williamson	1999-05-13	Biochemist, London & Melbourne
William Crawford Williamson	1854-06-01	24 November 1816 – 23 June 1895
Henry Norton Willis	1791-12-15	13 August 1819
John Christopher Willis	1919-05-15	20 February 1868 – 21 March 1958
John Raymond Willis	1992-03-12	
Robert Willis	1830-04-22	27 February 1800 – 28 February 1875
Thomas Willis	1663-11-18	27 January 1621 – 11 November 1675
Edward Nevill Willmer	1960-03-24	15 August 1902 – 8 April 2001
Henry Willoughby, 5th Baron Middleton	1787-01-25	19 December 1726 – 30 June 1800
Hugh Willoughby, 15th Baron Willoughby of Parham	1745-02-14	21 January 1765
Thomas Willoughby, 1st Baron Middleton	1693-11-30	c. 1670 – 17 April 1729
Charles Willughby	1683-07-25	? September 1694
Francis Willughby	1663-05-20	1635 – 3 July 1672 Original Fellow
Edward Wilmot	1730-01-15	29 October 1693 – 21 November 1786
Robert John Wilmot	1821-05-24	21 December 1784 – 31 May 1841
Ian Wilmut	2002-05-09	
Alan Geoffrey Wilson	2006-05-18	
Alan Herries Wilson	1942-03-19	2 July 1906 – 30 September 1995
Alexander Wilson	1838-03-01	c. 1781 – 28 November 1863 Civil servant
Allan Charles Wilson	1986-03-20	18 October 1934 – 21 July 1991
Arthur James Cochran Wilson	1963-03-21	28 November 1914 – 1 July 1995
Benjamin Wilson	1751-12-05	1721 – 6 June 1788
Charles Thomson Rees Wilson	1900-06-14	14 February 1869 – 15 November 1959
Charles William Wilson	1874-06-04	14 March 1836 – 25 October 1905
Colin James Ness Wilson	2015-05-01	1956 - Geologist
George Fergusson Wilson	1855-06-07	25 March 1822 – 28 March 1902 Founder of Wisley Gardens.
Giffin Wilson	1801-04-16	1766 - 1848
Glocester Wilson	1796-04-28	? 1852
Graham Selby Wilson	1978-03-16	10 September 1895 – 5 April 1987
Harold Albert Wilson	1906-05-03	1 December 1874 – 13 October 1964
Horace Hayman Wilson	1834-04-10	26 September 1786 – 8 May 1860
Ian Andrew Wilson	2000-05-11	Microbiologist, USA
Isaac Wilson	1831-02-24	c. 1756 – 2 December 1844 Physician to Navy
James Wilson	1803-05-19	1765 – 17 November 1821 Prof of Anatomy to RCS
James Harold Wilson, Baron Wilson of Rievaulx	1969-06-12	11 March 1916 – 24 May 1995 Statute
James Thomas Wilson	1909-05-06	14 April 1861 – 2 September 1945 Prof. of Anatomy, Cambridge
John Wilson	1845-02-06	11 December 1804 – 1 December 1875 Philanthropist & Scholar (Bombay)
John Wilson	1846-02-19	c. 1788 – 10 August 1870 Physician
John Wilson	1783-03-13	6 August 1741 – 18 October 1793
John Tuzo Wilson	1968-03-21	24 October 1908 – 15 April 1993
Robert Wilson	1975-03-20	16 April 1927 – 2 September 2002
Sophie Wilson	2013-05-02	
William James Erasmus Wilson	1845-02-20	25 November 1809 – 7 August 1884
William Wilson	1923-05-03	1 March 1875 – 14 October 1965 Physicist, St Andrews Univ.
William Edward Wilson	1896-06-04	19 July 1851 – 6 March 1908 Irish astronomer
James Wimshurst	1898-06-09	13 April 1832 – 3 January 1903
Joseph Windham	1781-11-08	21 August 1739 – 21 September 1810
William Windham	1744-01-26	1717 – 30 October 1761
Alan Hardwick Windle	1997-05-15	
Bertram Coghill Alan Windle	1899-06-01	8 May 1858 – 14 February 1929
Colin George Windsor	1995-06-09	28 June 1938 -
Other Hickman Windsor, 5th Earl of Plymouth	1773-04-22	? 30 May 1751 – 12 June 1799
Johann Heinrich Winkler	1747-01-08	12 March 1703 – 18 May 1770
Rowland Winn	1673-11-27	1609–1676 Merchant
Edward Winnington	1805-01-10	14 November 1749 – 9 January 1805 (died before election)
Gregory Paul Winter	1990-03-15	April 1951 -
John Winthrop	1734-04-04	25 August 1681 – 1 August 1747
John Winthrop	1663-05-20	12 February 1606 – 5 April 1676 Original Fellow
John Winthrop	1766-02-20	19 December 1714 – 3 May 1779
Sir Clifton Wintringham	1742-12-23	1710 – 10 January 1794
Frederick Charles William Wirtemberg, Prince of Wirtemberg	1797-05-11	6 November 1754 – 30 October 1816 honorary
Daniel Wise	2018-05-09	24 January 1971 –
Robert Wissett	1801-12-24	3 December 1820
George Witchell	1767-07-09	29 January 1785
William Withering	1785-11-24	March 1741 – 6 October 1799
Philip J. Withers	2016-04-29	Materials physicist
Stephen Withers	2012-04-19	
Nicolaes Witsen	1689-11-30	8 May 1641 – 10 August 1717
George Witt	1834-06-05	25 March 1804 – 20 February 1869 Surgeon, Bedford Infirmary
William Henry Wittrick	1980-03-20	29 October 1922 – 2 July 1986
Samuel Wix	1813-02-25	9 February 1771 – 4 September 1861
William Wix	1810-07-12	c. 1847
Charles Godfrey Woide	1785-04-21	4 July 1725 – 9 May 1790
Nathaniel Matthew Wolf	1777-04-10	24 January 1724 – 15 December 1784
Kenneth H. Wolfe	2017-05-05	
John Wolfe Wolfe-Barry	1895-06-13	7 December 1836 – 22 January 1918 Tower Bridge builder
Arnold Whittaker Wolfendale	1977-03-17	
Christian, Freiherr von Wolff	1710-11-08	24 January 1679 – 9 April 1754
Eric Wolff	2010-05-20	
Leonard Wolfson, Baron Wolfson	2005-05-26	11 November 1927 – 20 May 2010 honorary
Isaac Wolfson	1963-06-20	17 September 1897 – 20 June 1991 (Statute 12)
Alexander Luard Wollaston	1829-02-26	14 June 1804 – ? 10 June 1874
Charlton Wollaston	1756-03-25	23 May 1733 – 26 July 1764
Francis Wollaston	1723-06-27	6 June 1694 – 27 December 1774
Francis Wollaston	1769-04-13	23 November 1731 – 31 October 1815
Francis John Hyde Wollaston	1786-11-23	13 April 1762 – 12 October 1823
George Wollaston	1763-02-17	26 October 1738 – 14
William Hyde Wollaston	1793-05-09	6 August 1766 – 22 December 1828
Daniel Mark Wolpert	2012-04-19	
Lewis Wolpert	1980-03-20	embryologist
Alan Marshall Muir Wood	1980-03-20	
Bernard John Wood	1998-05-14	Geologist
Graham Charles Wood	1997-05-15	Prof. of Corrosion Science, UMIST
John Wood	1680-04-01	25 September 1682 Naval surveyor
John Wood	1871-06-08	12 October 1825 – 29 December 1891
John Nicholas Wood	2009-05-15	Biomedicine, UCL
Martin Francis Wood	1987-03-19	
Nicholas Wood	1864-06-02	24 April 1795 – 19 December 1865
Richard Dean Wood	1997-05-15	molecular biologist
Robert Wood	1789-11-19	1789 MP
Robert Wood	1681-04-13	? 1621 – 9 April 1685
Ronald Karslake Starr Wood	1976-03-18	Plant Biologist, Imperial College, London
Thomas Wood	1761-11-19	c. 1708 – 26 June 1799
Thomas Wood	1841-05-20	31 March 1804 – 23 October 1872
Thomas Barlow Wood	1919-05-15	21 January 1869 – 6 November 1929 Prof. of Agriculture, Cambridge Univ.
William Wood	1812-12-24	1774 – ? 26 May 1857
William Wood, 1st Baron Hatherley	1836-12-22	29 November 1801 – 10 July 1881
Bennet Woodcroft	1859-06-09	29 December 1803 – 07
Samuel Woodford	1664-11-02	15 April 1636 – 11 January 1700 Clergyman
Thomas Woodford	1708-04-07	26 March 1759
John Henry Woodhouse	2000-05-11	Prof. of Geophysics, Oxford Univ.
Robert Woodhouse	1802-12-16	28 April 1773 – ? 23 December 1827
Benjamin Woodroffe	1668-04-30	April 1638 – 14 August 1711
D. P. Woodruff	2006-05-18	
Michael Woodruff	1968-03-21	3 April 1911 – 10 March 2001
Andrew W. Woods	2017-05-05	
Donald Devereux Woods	1952-03-20	16 February 1912 – 6 November 1964
Henry Woods	1916-05-11	18 December 1868 – 4 April 1952
Stephen Esslemont Woods	1974-03-21	12 January 1912 – 18 June 1994
Arthur Smith Woodward	1901-06-06	23 May 1864 – 2 September 1944
Charles Woodward	1841-04-29	? 1789 – 16 April 1877 Agent
Henry Woodward	1873-06-12	24 November 1832 – 6 September 1921
Horace Bolingbroke Woodward	1896-06-04	20 August 1848 – 06
John Woodward	1693-11-30	1 May 1665 – 25 April 1728
Sidney William Wooldridge	1959-03-19	16 November 1900 – 25 April 1963
Trevor Dion Wooley	2007-05-17	
Michael Mark Woolfson	1984-03-15	crystallographer, computer simulation
John Thomas Woolhouse	1721-11-02	c. 1650 – 15 January 1734 Oculist
Herbert Henry Woollard	1938-03-17	1889 – 18 January 1939
Richard van der Riet Woolley	1953-03-19	24 April 1906 – 24 December 1986
John Woolmore	1830-05-27	c. 1756 – 2 December 1838
Paul Workman	2016-04-29	1952 –
Arthur Wormall	1956-03-15	17 January 1900 – 9 May 1964
Henry de Worms, 1st Baron Pirbright	1889-04-04	20 October 1840 – 9 January 1903
Henry Worsley	1705-11-30	c. 1675 – 15 March 1740 ambassasdor, MP for Newtown, IoW
Richard Worsley	1778-06-18	17 March 1751 – 8 August 1805
Edward Worth	1699-01-11	c. 1678–1733
Arthur Mason Worthington	1893-06-01	11 June 1852 – 5 December 1916
Brian Stewart Worthington	1998-05-14	9 June 1938 – 9 December 2007 consultant neuroradiologist
William Wotton	1687-12-14	13 August 1666 – 13
Peter Woulfe	1767-02-05	c. 1727–1803
Francis Wrangham	1804-11-15	11 June 1769 – 27 December 1842
Daniel Wray	1729-03-06	28 November 1701 – 29 December 1783
Gordon Richard Wray	1986-03-20	30 January 1928 – 17 August 2005
Christopher Wren	1663-05-20	20 October 1632 – 25 Feb 1723 Founder and President of Royal Society
Christopher Wren the Younger	1693-11-30	18 February 1675 – 24 August 1747 Numismatist and MP
Matthew Wren	1663-04-22	20 August 1629 – 14 June 1672 Original Fellow
Thomas Wren	1663-05-20	1633–1679 Clergyman Original Fellow
Almroth Edward Wright	1906-05-03	10 August 1861 – 30 April 1947
Charles Romley Alder Wright	1881-06-02	1844 – 25 July 1894
Edward Wright	1759-04-05	c. 1666 – 20 August 1761 Scottish Physician
Ernest Marshall Wright	2005-05-26	
John Wright	1843-06-01	21 March 1793 – 13 February 1893 Clergyman
Richard Wright	1767-03-19	c. 1739 – 14 October 1786
Thomas Wright	1879-06-12	9 November 1809 – 17 November 1884
William Wright	1778-03-12	March 1735 – 19 September 1819
John Wrottesley, 2nd Baron Wrottesley	1841-04-29	4 October 1798 – 27 October 1867
Adrian Frederick George Wyatt	2000-05-11	
John Wyatt	1778-02-12	2 November 1797 Surgeon
Terry Wyatt	2013-05-02	
William Wyatt	1769-06-08	c. 1742 – 1 February 1813 Physician
Jeffrey Wyatville	1830-05-27	3 August 1766 – 10 February 1840
Cyril Wyche	1663-05-20	c. 1632 – 29 December 1707 Original Fellow
Peter Wyche	1745-05-02	25 December 1709 – 1 November 1763
Peter Wyche	1663-05-20	1628–1699 Original Fellow
Edmund Wylde	1663-05-20	c. 1618 – c. 1695 Original Fellow
Andrew Hamilton Wyllie	1995-03-09	pathologist
Peter John Wyllie	1984-03-15	geologist
William Wynde	1663-05-20	c. 1647 – ? April 1722 Original Fellow
Edwin Wyndham-Quin, 3rd Earl of Dunraven and Mount-Earl	1834-04-10	19 May 1812 – 6 October 1871
Edmund Wyndham	1677-12-06	c. 1659 -
George Wyndham, 3rd Earl of Egremont	1797-12-07	18 December 1751 – 11 November 1837
Henry Penruddocke Wyndham	1783-01-09	4 June 1736 – 3 May 1819
V. C. Wynne-Edwards	1970-03-19	4 July 1906 – 5 January 1997
Charles Gorrie Wynne	1970-03-19	18 May 1911 – 1 October 1999
William Wynne	1794-03-06	1815 Knight
William Palmer Wynne	1896-06-04	13 February 1861 – 16 February 1950
Marmaduke Wyvill	1711-11-30	2 November 1722 MP for Richmond.
Marmaduke Wyvill	1735-02-06	1692 – 27 December 1753

=== Y ===
Name	Election date	Notes
Magdi Habib Yacoub	1999-05-13	heart surgeon
Elihu Yale	1717-11-30	5 April 1649 – 8 July 1721
Ziheng Yang	2006-05-18	
Alfred Fernandez Yarrow	1922-05-11	13 January 1842 – 24 January 1932
Frank Yates	1948-03-18	12 May 1902 – 17 June 1994
James Yates	1839-01-31	30 April 1789 – 7 May 1871
Grant David Yeats	1819-07-01	1773 – 14 November 1836
Thomas Pattinson Yeats	1781-03-08	c. 1782
John Yelloly	1814-05-05	30 April 1774 – 31 January 1842
Talbot Yelverton, Earl of Sussex	1722-02-01	2 May 1690 – 27 October 1731
Gerald Francis Yeo	1889-06-06	19 January 1845 – 1 May 1909
Thomas Yeoman	1764-01-12	1708 – 24 January 1781
Julia Yeomans	2013-05-02	
William Yolland	1859-06-09	17 March 1810 – 5 September 1885
Charles Maurice Yonge	1946-03-21	9 December 1899 – 17 March 1986
James Yonge	1702-11-30	27 February 1647 – 25 July 1721 Naval surgeon & Physician
Sir George Yonge	1784-05-13	1731 – 25 September 1812
Sir William Yonge	1748-06-23	10 August 1755
Charles Yorke	1750-12-13	30 December 1722 – 20 January 1770
Charles Philip Yorke	1801-11-12	12 March 1764 – 13 March 1834
Charles Yorke, 4th Earl of Hardwicke	1847-02-25	2 April 1799 – 17 September 1873
John Yorke	1773-02-18	27 August 1728 – 3 September 1801
Philip James Yorke	1849-06-07	13 October 1799 – 14 December 1874
Philip Yorke, 1st Earl of Hardwicke	1753-12-06	1 December 1690 – 6 March 1764
Philip Yorke, 2nd Earl of Hardwicke	1741-01-29	19 March 1720 – 16 May 1790
Philip Yorke, 3rd Earl of Hardwicke	1790-11-25	31 May 1757 – 18 November 1834
Warrington Yorke	1932-05-05	11 April 1883 – 24 April 1943 Prof. of Tropical Medicine, Liverpool
Alec David Young	1973-03-15	15 August 1913 – 27 January 2005 aero-engineer
Alfred Young	1934-05-03	16 April 1873 – 15 December 1940
Arthur Young	1774-04-28	11 September 1741 – 20 April 1820
Christopher Alwyne Jack Young	1972-03-16	7 March 1912 – 20 January 1978
Ian Robert Young	1989-03-16	
James Young	1873-06-12	13 July 1811 – 13 May 1883
John Zachary Young	1945-03-22	18 March 1907 – 4 July 1997
Pierre Henry John Young	1974-03-21	12 June 1926 – 4 August 1985
Frank George Young	1949-03-17	25 March 1908 – 20 September 1988
George Young	1781-02-15	17 June 1732 – 28 June 1810 Admiral
Robert Young	2013-05-02	
Samuel Young	1795-03-26	23 February 1766 – 14 December 1826 Civil servant
Sydney Young	1893-06-01	29 December 1857 – 8 April 1937 Professor of Chemistry, Bristol
Thomas Young	1794-06-19	13 June 1773 – 10 May 1829
William Young	1748-03-10	1725 – 8 April 1788
William Young	1786-06-15	1 December 1749 – 10 January 1815
William Henry Young	1907-05-02	20 October 1863 – 7 July 1942
Charles Wright Younghusband	1852-06-03	20 June 1821 – 28 October 1899
George Udny Yule	1921-05-12	18 February 1871 – 26 June 1951

=== Z ===
Name	Date Elected	Notes
Franz Xaver Zach	1804-04-12	4 June 1754 – 2 September 1832
Oliver Louis Zangwill	1977-03-17	29 October 1913 – 12 October 1987 psychologist
Francesco Maria Zannotti	1741-02-26	6 January 1692 – 25 December 1777
Eustachio Zanotti	1740-11-06	27 November 1709 – 15 May 1782
Erik Christopher Zeeman	1975-03-20	
Semir Zeki	1990-03-15	
Olgierd Cecil Zienkiewicz	1979-03-15	18 May 1921 – 2 January 2009
John Michael Ziman	1967-03-16	16 May 1925 – 2 January 2005
Andrew Peter Zisserman	2007-05-17	
Philip Henry Zollman	1727-06-22	c. 1748
Solly Zuckerman, Baron Zuckerman	1943-03-18	30 May 1904 – 31 March 1993 anatomist, evolutionist

== Foreign members ==
=== W ===
Name	Election date	Notes
Otto Heinrich Warburg	1934-05-03	8 October 1883 – 1 August 1970; German chemist, Nobel Prize for Medicine (1931)
James Dewey Watson	1981-04-09	
Ernst Heinrich Weber	1862-06-19	24 June 1795 – 26 January 1878
Max Wilhelm Carl Weber	1935-06-27	6 December 1852 – 7 February 1937
Wilhelm Eduard Weber	1850-11-21	24 October 1804 – ? 23 June 1890
Carl Wilhelm Weierstrass	1881-05-12	31 October 1815 – 19 February 1897
Detlef Weigel	2010-05-20	
André Weil	1966-04-21	6 May 1906 – 6 August 1998; French U.S. mathematician group theory, algebraic geometry
Steven Weinberg	1981-04-09	U.S. physicist, electroweak force, Nobel Prize (1979)
August Friedrich Leopold Weismann	1910-06-30	17 January 1834 – 5 November 1914
Charles Weissmann	1983-06-30	Hungarian-born Switzerland British molecular biologist
Friedrich August Ferdinand Christian Went	1933-05-25	18 June 1863 – 24 July 1935
Susan R. Wessler	2017-05-05	
Frank Henry Westheimer	1983-06-30	U.S. chemist
Hermann Weyl	1936-06-25	9 November 1885 – 9 December 1955
John Archibald Wheeler	1995-03-09	
Gustav Heinrich Wiedemann	1884-01-31	2 October 1826 – 23 March 1899
Heinrich Otto Wieland	1931-06-25	4 June 1877 – 5 August 1957
Torsten Nils Wiesel	1982-06-24	
Eugene Paul Wigner	1970-04-23	17 November 1902 – 1 January 1995
Ellen D. Williams	2016-04-29	5 December 1953 –
Richard Willstätter	1928-06-21	13 August 1872 – 3 August 1942
Edmund Beecher Wilson	1921-05-05	19 October 1856 – 3 March 1939
Edward Osborne Wilson	1990-06-28	
Øjvind Winge	1947-05-01	19 May 1886 – 5 April 1964 Danish geneticist
Sergius Winogradsky	1919-06-26	14 September 1856 – 24 February 1953
Johannes Wislicenus	1897-04-01	24 June 1835 – 5 December 1902
Edward Witten	1999-05-13	U.S. mathematician and physicist, Fields Medal (1990)
Carl Richard Woese	2006-05-18	
Friedrich Wöhler	1854-06-15	31 July 1800 – 23 September 1882
Peter Guy Wolynes	2007-05-17	
Robert Williams Wood	1919-06-26	2 May 1868 – 11 August 1955
Robert Burns Woodward	1956-04-26	10 April 1917 – 8 July 1979
Sewall Wright	1963-04-25	21 December 1889 – 3 March 1988
Carl Isaac Wunsch	2002-05-09	
Karl Adolph Wurtz	1864-06-09	26 November 1817 – 10 May 1884
Kurt Wuthrich	2010-05-20	
Ralph Walter Graystone Wyckoff	1951-04-19	9 August 1897 – 2 November 1994

=== Y ===
Name	Election date	Notes
Eli Yablonovitch	2013-05-02	
Mitsuhiro Yanagida	2000-05-11	
Chen Ning Yang	1992-06-18	
Charles Yanofsky	1985-06-27	U.S. scientist, medicine
Hideki Yukawa	1963-04-25	23 January 1907 – 8 September 1981

=== Z ===
Name	Year	Notes
Richard Neil Zare	1999-05-13	U.S. physicist
Pieter Zeeman	1921-05-05	25 May 1865 – 9 October 1943
Yakov Borisovich Zel'dovich	1979-04-26	8 March 1914 – 2 December 1987
Nikolay Zheludev	2018-05-09	23 April 1955 –
Frits Zernike	1956-04-26	16 July 1888 – 10 March 1966
Ahmed Hassan Zewail	2001-05-10	
Guangzhao Zhou	2012-04-19	
Karl Ziegler	1971-04-22	26 November 1898 – 11 August 1973
Rolf Martin Zinkernagel	1998-05-14	
Ferdinand Zirkel	1897-11-25	20 May 1838 – 11 June 1912
