= John Raven =

English classical scholar (1914-1980)

- Raven in 1957
- Born: John Earle Raven; 13 December 1914; Cambridge, Cambridgeshire, England
- Died: 5 March 1980 (aged 65); Shepreth, Cambridgeshire, England
- Occupations: Classical scholar; Botanist
- Spouse: Constance Faith Alethea Hugh Smith
- Children: 5, including Sarah and Andrew

Academic background
- Education: St Ronan's School; Marlborough College; Trinity College, Cambridge

Academic work
- Discipline: Classics
- Sub-discipline: Early Greek philosophy
- Institutions: University of Cambridge
- Notable students: Myles Burnyeat
- Notable works: The Pre-Socratic Philosophers (1957)

John Earle Raven (13 December 1914 – 5 March 1980) was an English classical scholar, notable for his work on pre-Socratic philosophy, and amateur botanist. His wife, Faith, inherited the 35,000 acre Ardtornish Estate in Argyllshire, Scotland; their family continues to run it today as a commercial enterprise.

== Early life and education ==
John Raven was born on 13 December 1914 in Cambridge, the son of Charles Earle Raven, sometime Regius Professor of Divinity at Cambridge and Master of Christ's College, Cambridge and of Margaret Wollaston. His mother's family endowed Raven with a distinguished intellectual pedigree, including between 1723 and 1829 seven Fellows of the Royal Society (among them Charlton Wollaston, Francis Wollaston (1694-1774), Francis Wollaston (1762-1823), George Wollaston and William Hyde Wollaston); Raven was also a 7th generation descendant of William Wollaston, the philosophical writer. On his father's side, he was related to Samuel Hole, Dean of Rochester.

Raven was educated at St Ronan's School, then situated at Worthing, before proceeding in September 1928 with a scholarship to Marlborough College, where he distinguished himself academically, winning prizes in English verse, Greek iambics, Greek and Latin prose and Latin verse, culminating in a scholarship to Trinity College, Cambridge. He did not confine himself to the intellectual, playing in the First XV at rugby and setting new school records in 1934 for the high jump and 440 yards.

Following the award of a first class degree in classics at Trinity Raven became in 1946 a research fellow there. In October 1948 he was elected a fellow of King's College, Cambridge.

During the Second World War he was a conscientious objector, basing his case on arguments by Plato (and no doubt influenced by his father's pacifist views). He undertook unsalaried social work for Guy Clutton-Brock at Oxford House in Bethnal Green. This included running an experiment in education for Bethnal Green children evacuated to North Wales, which impressed Archbishop William Temple, who recommended the experiment to Rab Butler and James Chuter Ede at the Board of Education.

== Classical scholar ==
As a classical scholar, Raven's interests were in ancient philosophy. In 1957 he published with Geoffrey Kirk The Pre-Socratic philosophers, a standard work for undergraduates still in use today. Raven contributed the chapters relating to the Italian tradition (Pythagoras of Samos, Alcmaeon of Croton, Pre-Parmenidean Pythagoreanism, Parmenides of Elea, Zeno of Elea, Melissus of Samos, Philolaus of Croton and Eurytus of Croton) and on Anaxagoras and Archelaus.

As Senior Tutor at King's in the 1960s he turned the college to the left, telling public schools that their boys could no longer expect to "swan in", as previously.

Raven was the undergraduate tutor of Myles Burnyeat, who subsequently became the fifth Laurence Professor of Ancient Philosophy at Cambridge University.

== Botanist: The Heslop-Harrison fraud ==
While Raven's principal professional occupation was his career as a classical scholar, he applied a similar intellectual rigour to his amateur interest in botany.

From the mid-1930s John Heslop-Harrison, Professor of Botany at Kings College, Newcastle-upon-Tyne, had reported significant new plant discoveries on expeditions to the Inner and Outer Hebrides. The sheer scale of the discoveries aroused scepticism, and in 1948 Raven secured a grant from Trinity College to fund a trip to Harris and Rùm in July and August of that year to investigate the claims of Heslop-Harrison.

Raven's conclusions about two of the notable species were published, briefly, in Nature. He suggested that both Carex bicolor and Polycarpon tetraphyllum were introductions to Rùm, but did not comment on the possible means of introduction. His full report of the expedition and fraud was deposited in the library of King's College, Cambridge on 5 May 1960, to attack Prof. Jack Heslop-Harrison's electron microscope research into plant genetics (DNA) and only published in full in 1999 after the deaths of both Heslop-Harrison, his son Jack Heslop-Harrison and Raven himself. In the report Raven alleged that at some time in the 1940s Heslop Harrison transported alien plants to the Isle of Rum and planted them in the soil; he then "discovered" the plants, claimed they were indigenous to the area and that he was the first to find them. Raven's report to the council of Trinity College states: "In the interests not only of truth but also of the reputation of British science it is essential somehow to discover what plants and what insects he (Heslop Harrison) has either completely fabricated or else deliberately introduced into the Hebrides."

Raven's classical and botanical interests were brought together in four J. H. Gray Lectures given at Cambridge in 1976, published after his death as Plants and Plant Lore in Ancient Greece.

== Family ==
Raven married Constance Faith Alethea Hugh Smith; they had five children: the writer Sarah Raven, Anna Raven, the conservationist Andrew Raven, Hugh Raven, and Jane Raven. On marriage in 1954 John and Faith Raven purchased Docwra's Manor in Shepreth, near Cambridge, where they cultivated a garden which is now open to the public. Raven's family, through his wife Faith's inheritance, own the 35,000 acres (14,000 ha) Ardtornish Estate in Scotland.

John Raven died on 5 March 1980 in Shepreth, near Cambridge, aged 65. Following his death a group of friends contributed to a collection of essays to commemorate his life, published in 1981 as John Raven by his Friends.

== Selected publications ==
- Pythagoreans and Eleatics: An account of the interaction between the two opposed schools during the fifth and early fourth centuries B.C, Cambridge University Press, 1948
- Mountain Flowers (with Max Walters), Collins 1956 ISBN 0-00-213142-0
- The Presocratic Philosophers: A Critical History with a Selection of Texts (with G. S. Kirk), Cambridge University Press, 1957
- Plato's Thought in the Making: a Study of the Development of His Metaphysics, Cambridge University Press 1965
- A Botanist's Garden, Collins 1971 ISBN 0-00-211098-9
- Pythagoreans and Eleatics, Ares Pub 1981 ISBN 0-89005-367-7
- Raven, J.E. (2000). Stearn, W.T. (ed.). Plants and plant lore in ancient Greece. Oxford: Leopard's Press. ISBN 9780904920406.

== Bibliography ==
- John Raven by his Friends, Edited by John Lipscomb and R. W. David, Published privately by Faith Raven, 1981, ISBN 0-9507345-0-0 (cited above as Raven)
