= Francis Wollaston =

Francis Wollaston may refer to:

- Francis Wollaston (scientist) (1694–1774), English scientist and father of the below astronomer
- Francis Wollaston (astronomer) (1731–1815), Anglican priest, author and father of the below philosopher
- Francis Wollaston (philosopher) (1762–1823), Anglican Archdeacon of Essex and Jacksonian Professor of natural philosopher
