= Richard Grucza =

American epidemiologist

Richard Allen Grucza
- Born: Corry, Pennsylvania
- Education: B.A. Rochester Institute of Technology, 1989; M.S. Pennsylvania State University, 1991; Ph.D. Washington University in St. Louis, 2000.
- Awards: Walter G. Klopfer Award from the Society for Personality Assessment for distinguished contribution to the literature in personality assessment
- Scientific career
- Fields: Psychiatry, epidemiology, addiction medicine
- Institutions: Saint Louis University School of Medicine, Washington University School of Medicine
- Thesis: Thermodynamics of molecular recognition by the tandem SH2 domain of Syk kinase (2000)
- Doctoral advisor: Gabriel Waksman

Richard Grucza is an American epidemiologist and professor in the Department of Family and Community Medicine at Saint Louis University School of Medicine.

== Education ==
Grucza received his B.S. from Rochester Institute of Technology in 1989, his M.S. from Pennsylvania State University in 1991, and his Ph.D. in Molecular biophysics from Washington University in St. Louis in 2000. As a postdoctoral fellow, he received a Master of Psychiatric Epidemiology from Washington University in St. Louis 2003.

== Research ==
Grucza's research mainly focuses on genetic and environmental causes of addiction, as well as the health effects of alcohol consumption.

Grucza has conducted research on the long-term effects of the minimum legal drinking age showing that youth who were legally restricted from drinking until age 21 had lower risk for alcoholism and other problems later in adulthood compared to those who were legally permitted to purchase alcohol at earlier ages. He has also conducted research on long-term effects of tobacco control policies targeting youth purchases. These studies were noted in the Institute of Medicine's 2015 report on the potential public health benefits of raising the tobacco purchase age to 21.

Several of his studies have examined the "closing gender gap" for alcohol problems in the U.S., documenting that rates of alcoholism and binge drinking for women have become closer to those for men over the long term.

In a 2014 study, he and his colleagues found that the adoption of tobacco control policies by certain U.S. states was associated with decreases in suicide rates in these states.

In 2016, he led a study analyzing data from the National Survey on Drug Use and Health that found that the increase in marijuana use by American adults was less than that initially reported. In a related study, he found that rates of marijuana use disorder among U.S. adolescents had declined over the years 2002 to 2013 and that this may be related to declining rates of delinquency.

== Honors and awards ==
Grucza has received the Walter G. Klopfer Award from the Society for Personality Assessment for distinguished contribution to the literature in personality assessment, and was named an Outstanding Public Health Transdisciplinary Scholar by Washington University's Institute for Public Health in 2012.
