= Wilhelmus (disambiguation) =

Wilhelmus (full title: Wilhelmus van Nassouwe) is the national anthem of the Kingdom of the Netherlands.

Wilhelmus may also refer to:

== People with the given name Wilhelmus ==
- Wilhelmus à Brakel (1635–1711), Dutch Protestant Reformation theologian and minister
- Wilhelmus Beekman (1623–1707), Dutch-US politician
- Wilhelmus Bekkers (1890–1957), Dutch tug-of-war Olympic medalist and swimming instructor
- Wilhelmus Beurs (1656–1700), Dutch Golden Age painter
- Wilhelmus Braams (1886–1955), Dutch long-distance runner
- Wilhelmus Bryan (born ?), US documentary film producer
- Wilhelmus Demarteau (1917–2012), Dutch Roman Catholic prelate
- Wilhelmus Doll (1900–1980), Dutch wrestler and Olympic competitor
- Wilhelmus Simon Petrus Fortuijn (1948–2002), known as Pim Fortuyn, Dutch politician, civil servant, sociologist, author and professor
- Wilhelmus Frederik van Leeuwen (1860–1930), Dutch politician, mayor of Amsterdam (1901–10), and lawyer
- Wilhelmus Luijpen (1922–1980), Dutch philosopher and Catholic priest
- Wilhelmus Luxemburg (1929–2018), Netherlands-born US mathematician
- Wilhelmus Nuyens (1823–1894), Dutch historian
- Wilhelmus Wilhelmius (1720–1771), Dutch minister, mathematician, and philosopher
- Wilhelmus Zakaria Johannes (1895–1952), Indonesian radiologist

== People with the surname Wilhelmus ==
- Joop Wilhelmus (1943–1994), Dutch pornographer and entrepreneur

== Other uses ==
- De Wilhelmus, the grand ducal anthem of Luxembourg
- Fort Wilhelmus, a fort on Burlington Island, New Jersey, USA
