= Luitgard Veraart =

German financial mathematician

Luitgard Anna Maria Veraart is a German applied mathematician specialising in mathematical finance, and particularly in assessing, modeling, and managing the risks associated with financial networks. She is a professor of mathematics at the London School of Economics.

== Education and career ==
Veraart was a student at the University of Ulm, where she earned double diplomas in mathematics and in mathematics and economics in 2004. Meanwhile, she also earned a master's degree in statistical science, from the University of Cambridge, in 2003. Continuing at Cambridge for doctoral study, she completed a Ph.D. in 2007.

After postdoctoral research at Princeton University, she became an assistant professor in financial mathematics at the Karlsruhe Institute of Technology in 2008. She moved to the London School of Economics as a lecturer in 2010, was promoted to associate professor in 2013, and became full professor in 2021.

== Recognition ==
Veraart was one of two winners of the 2019 Adams Prize of the University of Cambridge, jointly with Heather Harrington, for their research on the mathematics of networks. The prize citation recognised Veraart's development of "new tools and concepts relevant for the representation and analysis of financial stability and systemic risk in banking networks". In 2022, she was elected Vice Chair of the Society for Industrial and Applied Mathematics Activity Group on Financial Mathematics and Engineering (SIAM SIAG/FME).
