= Van Neste =

Van Neste or Vanneste is a surname. Notable people with the surname include:

- Abraham Van Neste (1713-1779), American politician and judge
- Carlo Van Neste (1914–1992), Belgian violinist
- Christian Vanneste (born 1947), French politician
- Jacques Vanneste, UK-based mathematician
- Willy Van Neste (born 1944), Belgian cyclist
