= Samuel McLaren =

Australian mathematician and mathematical physicist

Samuel Bruce McLaren
- Born: 16 August 1876; Yedo, Japan
- Died: 13 August 1916 (aged 39); Abbeville, France
- Awards: Adams Prize (1913)
- Scientific career
- Fields: mathematician

Professor Samuel Bruce McLaren (16 August 1876 – 13 August 1916) was an Australian mathematician and mathematical physicist. Joint winner of the Adams Prize in 1913 and professor of mathematics, University College, Reading from 1913 until his death during the Battle of the Somme.

== Early life ==
McLaren was born in Yedo, near Tokyo, Japan, elder son of Rev. Samuel Gilfillan McLaren M.A. a Scottish missionary and later professor of sacred history and biblical literature at the Presbyterian Union Theological Seminary, and Marjory Millar McLaren née Bruce. The eldest child his siblings included Mary, Charles McLaren (psychiatrist) (later a missionary to Korea), and Marjory. In 1886, the family moved to Australia, where in 1889 his father became principal of Presbyterian Ladies' College, Melbourne. One of his teachers at the university stated in 1903 that McLaren was by far the ablest student he had met during his twelve years' tenure of office, and one whose ability should be sufficient to place him in a very conspicuous position as an original thinker.

== Late life ==
During the Battle of the Somme, on 26 July 1916, near Abbeville, he was shot in the head while endeavouring to clear a pit of bombs threatened by a nearby fire. He returned a second time to continue this work, but was hit again. He was carried on a stretcher to the dressing station, on the way the bearers put the stretcher down for a minutes rest, and Lt. McLaren stood up, declaring he was too heavy and would walk. He collapsed and after a few days in hospital he died of his wounds on 13 August 1916. He was unmarried and was buried at Abbeville.

Described as 'absolutely fearless and intrepid to an extent which made him both an anxiety to his brother officers and an inspiration to his men', one of the tragedies of his death was that it occurred before he published his papers and consequently much of his work was lost. His death and that of Henry Moseley were considered as perhaps the two most irreparable losses to British science caused by the First World War. Papers by McLaren were published posthumously as Scientific Papers (Cambridge, 1925) with a preface by Sir Joseph Larmor, a 'Personal Appreciation' by Prof. Hugh Walker and a reprint of an obituary by Prof. J. W. Nicholson. In it McLaren's best friend Prof. Walker wrote;

He bore the load of thoughts that passed the spheres
Exile he bore, for duty must be done
Few were his friends, and rarer still his peers
Alone he stood, for genius lives alone.

The world crashed round him; and his soul, called back
From those "strange seas" whereon it voyaged still,
Faced humble tasks to shape and Empire's track
One hair's breadth nearer the Eternal Will.

He died. But sure that spirit pure and high
By death has made his own the immortal prize
For always, in the Everlasting's eye,
The grandest virtue is self-sacrifice."

His brother Charles was a prominent psychiatrist and missionary to east Asia.
