= Robert Peirson =

English astronomer and theoretical physicist

- Born: 2 June 1821; Barnsbury, Islington, London
- Died: 21 June 1891
- Education: St John's College, Cambridge
- Awards: Adams Prize (1850)
- Scientific career
- Fields: astronomy and optics

Robert Peirson (2 June 1821 – 15 June 1891) was an English astronomer and theoretical physicist.

Born into a wealthy family at their residence at No. 5, Barnsbury Park, Islington, Middlesex, Robert Peirson lived his life there except during his residence at Cambridge.

He was admitted a Foundation Scholar in 1842, and took his degree as Third Wrangler in 1845, the year of Dr Parkinson and Sir William Thomson (now Lord Kelvin). He was admitted a Fellow of the College in 1849 in succession to Mr Blick, who had accepted the living of Brandesburton; and kept his Fellowship till 1855. He does not appear to have held any College office. In 1850 he was awarded the first Adams Prize, founded in 1848, for an essay on The Theory of the Long Inequality of Uranus and Neptune, which was printed in vol. ix of the Transactions of the Cambridge Philosophical Society.

After leaving Cambridge he lived a reclusive life and occupied himself with the study of astronomy and optics. In 1858 he purchased several acres of land in Wimbledon Park, Surrey, and arranged the construction there during 1859 to 1861 of a stately residence, which he named Devonshire Lodge. However, he suffered a severe financial reverse shortly before he could move there. Consequently, he had to sell Devonshire Lodge and remain at his Barnsbury residence.

He never married. His posthumous papers were examined by Alfred William Flux, Fellow of St John's College, Cambridge, with a view to the publication of some portion of them. In 1893, St. John's College Library acquired the manuscript papers and a few notebooks. The material is contained in 50 boxes, and the majority relates to astronomy and optics, dating from 1854 to 1890.
