= Susan Howson (mathematician) =

British mathematician

- Born: 1973 (age 52–53)
- Education: University of Cambridge
- Awards: Adams Prize (2002)
- Scientific career
- Thesis: Iwasawa Theory of Elliptic Curves for ρ-Adic Lie Extensions (1998)
- Doctoral advisor: John H. Coates

Susan Howson (born 1973) is a British mathematician whose research is in the fields of algebraic number theory and arithmetic geometry.

== Education and career ==
Howson received her PhD in mathematics from the University of Cambridge in 1998 with thesis title Iwasawa Theory of Elliptic Curves for ρ-Adic Lie Extensions under the supervision of John H. Coates.

Howson has taught at MIT, University of Cambridge, University of Oxford, and University of Nottingham.

She then left academia and studied medicine in Southampton. After graduating she became a consultant in Child and Adolescent mental health, working in the NHS in Devon.

== Recognition ==
In 2002, Howson won the Adams Prize for her work on number theory and elliptic curves. She was the first woman to win the prize in its 120-year history. In an interview, she indicated that the competitive and single-minded nature of higher mathematics is possibly part of what discourages women from pursuing it.

She also held a Royal Society Dorothy Hodgkin Research Fellowship.
