= Andrew Raven =

British conservationist

Andrew Owen Earle Raven OBE (22 January 1959 – 4 October 2005) was a British conservationist and an influential contributor to modern land policy in Scotland.

The eldest son of John Raven, a Cambridge University classics don, and grandson of Charles E. Raven, Regius Professor of Divinity at Cambridge, he developed professional expertise in land management. He was a trustee of the John Muir Trust from 1989 to 1995, a time when the charity started to acquire land in the Scottish Highlands. In 1995 he became their Director of Land Management.

In 1992 he became a member of the Council of the Rural Forum, a highly influential group which for the first time brought together rural communities and Scottish policy-makers. Three years later he joined the Scottish Consumer Council, seeing himself there as the voice of rural Scotland in consumer affairs. In 2000, he was appointed a Commissioner of the Forestry Commission, becoming the chairman of its National Committee for Scotland in 2003.

Raven was awarded an OBE in 2005.

He died of non-Hodgkin lymphoma at the age of 46 on 4 October 2005.
