= Charles McLaren (psychiatrist) =

Australian doctor and missionary

- Born: 23 August 1882; Tokyo
- Died: 9 October 1957 (aged 75); Kew, Victoria
- Resting place: Box Hill Cemetery
- Occupations: Psychiatrist and missionary

Charles Inglis McLaren M.D. (23 August 1882 – 9 October 1957) was an Australian psychiatrist and missionary.

== Early life and education ==
McLaren was born in Tokyo to Rev. Samuel Gilfillan McLaren M.A., a Scottish missionary, and his wife Marjory. He attended Scotch College, Melbourne, and then Ormond College at the University of Melbourne, from which he received a Bachelor of Medicine in 1906, a Bachelor of Science in 1907 and a Doctorate of Medicine in 1910. He was resident medical officer at the Royal Melbourne Hospital from 1907 to 1908 and in 1909 moved to the Children's Hospital. In 1910, as Australasian chairman of the Student Volunteer Movement for Foreign Missions, he toured Australian and New Zealand universities.

== Career ==
McLaren married Jessie Reeve, daughter of a missionary and travelling secretary of the Christian Union, on 22 August 1911 at Alma Road Presbyterian Church in St Kilda. They travelled to Korea as missionaries, and McLaren was assistant superintendent and then superintendent of Paton Memorial Hospital in Chinju. In 1917 he enlisted in the Royal Army Medical Corps and was medical officer to the Chinese Labour Battalion in France. He was professor of neurology and psychological medicine at Union Christian Medical College, Severance Hospital, in Seoul from 1922 to 1939 before returning to Chinju Hospital in 1940 (he also undertook further study at Vienna in 1929).

McLaren revisited Melbourne periodically, lecturing on the relationship between body and mind in 1927, publishing a paper in the Australasian Journal of Psychology and Philosophy in 1928, and lecturing for the Melbourne University Student Christian Movement in 1934. He was a prolific journal contributor on medical issues and also discussed the Shinto shrine issue in religious journals. He argued against emperor-worship in Japan in the 1930s and was imprisoned for eleven weeks at the outbreak of World War II before being interned and returned to Melbourne in November 1942. He published Preface to Peace with Japan, Eleven Weeks in a Japanese Prison Cell and They Kept the Faith in the 1943–44 period and later published Christianity, Communism and the World Situation in 1952.

McLaren contested the 1949 federal election as an independent candidate for the seat of Melbourne, running against Immigration Minister Arthur Calwell on a platform of opposition to the White Australia policy; he received 3.6% of the vote. He organised the John Fisher Williams Memorial Foundation in 1951, and later published The Christian Faith and the White Australia Policy. He died while revising a manuscript on Jesus' life at Kew in 1957 and was buried at Box Hill.

McLaren's work in Korea was the subject of a 1958 book, called A doctor in Korea, written by Presbyterian minister, Esmond New, and published by the Australian Presbyterian Board of Missions.

Charles' elder brother Samuel Bruce McLaren was an Adams Prize winning Professor of Mathematics who died during the Battle of the Somme.
