= Konstantin Ardakov =

Mathematics professor and tutor

Konstantin Ardakov (born 1979) is professor of pure mathematics at the Mathematical Institute, University of Oxford and fellow and tutor in mathematics at Brasenose College, Oxford.

After education at the University of Oxford and the University of Cambridge, he held positions at Cambridge, the University of Sheffield, the University of Nottingham, and Queen Mary University of London, before returning to Oxford.

He was awarded the 2019–20 Adams Prize for making "substantial contributions to noncommutative Iwasawa theory, and to the p-adic representation theory of p-adic Lie groups".
