= Cryophorus =

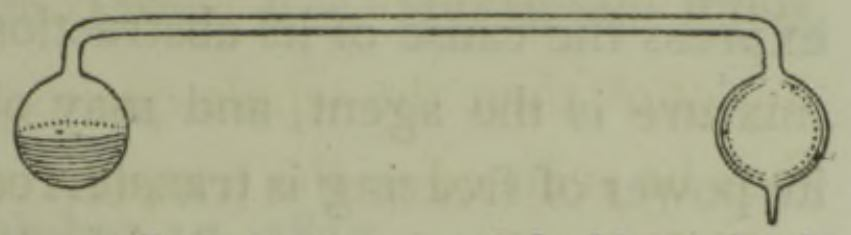
Wollaston's diagram of a cryophorus. When the empty ball on the right is immersed in a freezing mixture of snow and salt, the water in the ball on the left freezes in a few minutes.

A cryophorus is a glass container containing liquid water and water vapor. It is used in physics courses to demonstrate rapid freezing by evaporation. A typical cryophorus has a bulb at one end connected to a tube of the same material at the other end. When the liquid water is manipulated into the bulbed end, and the other end is submerged into a freezing mixture (such as liquid nitrogen), the gas pressure drops as it is cooled. The liquid water begins to evaporate, producing more water vapor. Evaporation causes the water to cool rapidly to its freezing point and it solidifies suddenly. (Note: Wollaston's cryophorus was a repurposed "pulse glass". The "pulse glass" or "pulse hammer" (German: Pulshammer) was a toy / novelty that had existed in Germany since the 1760s and perhaps earlier. In 1767 Benjamin Franklin visited Germany, saw a pulse hammer, and in 1768, improved it. See: Benjamin Franklin's letter to John Winthrop of 2 July 1768; Franklin, Benjamin (1769). Experiments And Observations On Electricity, Made At Philadelphia in America …. London, England: David Henry. pp. 489–492.; Robison, John; Watt, James; Brewster, David (1822). System of Mechanical Philosophy. Vol. 2. Edinburgh, Scotland: J. Murray. p. 14, footnote.; Franklin's pulse glass consisted of two glass bulbs connected by a U-shaped tube; one of the bulbs was partially filled with water in equilibrium with its vapor. Holding the partially filled bulb in one's hand would cause the water to flow into the empty bulb. For videos of Franklin's pulse glass in operation, see: Pulse Glass; Franklin's pulse glass; Wollaston was familiar with the pulse glass's construction: from (Wollaston, 1813), p. 73: "The mode of effecting this [i.e., expelling air from the cryophorus] is well known to those who are accustomed to blow glass." In the case of Franklin's pulse glass, water in the filled bulb was caused to evaporate by heating the water in the filled bulb. In the case of Wollaston's cryophorus, water in the filled bulb was caused to evaporate by cooling and condensing the water vapor in the empty bulb. See also: Reid, David Boswell (1851). Rudiments of Chemistry: With Illustrations of the Chemistry of Daily Life (4th ed.). London, England: Hippolyte Bailliere. pp. 163–164.; Hopkins, George Milton (1890). Experimental Science: Elementary, Practical and Experimental Physics. New York, New York, USA: Munn & Co. pp. 184-188.)

Wollaston's cryophorus was a precursor to the modern heat pipe.

== History ==
The cryophorus was first described by William Hyde Wollaston in an 1813 paper titled, "On a method of freezing at a distance."
