= James Walker (physician) =

James Walker, FRS (c. 1720 – 22 February 1789) was a British physician.

He matriculated at Brasenose College, in 1734. He lived in Springhead, near Hull. He was elected Fellow of the Royal Society on 9 June 1774.

He is the grandfather of Sir James Walker, 1st Baronet (1803–1883).
