= Abel–Goncharov interpolation =

In mathematics, Abel–Goncharov interpolation determines a polynomial such that various higher derivatives are the same as those of a given function at given points. It was introduced by J. M. Whittaker (1935) and rediscovered by V. L. Goncharov (1954).
