= Adams Prize =

Mathematics prize

The Adams Prize is a prize awarded each year by the Faculty of Mathematics at St John's College to a UK-based mathematician for distinguished research in mathematical sciences.

The prize is named after the mathematician John Couch Adams and was endowed by members of St John's College and approved by the senate of the university in 1848, to commemorate Adams' role in the discovery of the planet Neptune. Originally open only to Cambridge graduates, the current stipulation is that the mathematician must reside in the UK and be under forty years of age.

The Adams Prize is awarded in three parts: the first is paid directly to the candidate; another third is paid to the candidate's institution to fund research expenses; and the final third is paid on publication of a survey paper in the winner's field in a major mathematics journal.

The prize has been awarded to many well-known mathematicians, including James Clerk Maxwell and Sir William Hodge. The first female recipient, in 2002, was Susan Howson, then a lecturer at the University of Nottingham, for her work on number theory and elliptic curves.

== Subject area ==
- 2015–16: Applied analysis
- 2016–17: Statistical analysis of big data
- 2017–18: The mathematics of astronomy and cosmology
- 2018–19: The mathematics of networks

== Partial list of prize winners ==
The complete list of prize winners can be found on the Adams Prize webpage, on the University of Cambridge website. The following partial list is compiled from internet sources:

- 1850 Robert Peirson
- 1857 James Clerk Maxwell, "on the stability of the motion of Saturn's rings"
- 1865 Edward Walker
- 1871 Isaac Todhunter
- 1877 Edward Routh
- 1883 J. J. Thomson
- 1893 John Henry Poynting
- 1899 Joseph Larmor and Gilbert Walker
- 1901 Hector Munro MacDonald
- 1907 Ernest William Brown
- 1909 George Adolphus Schott
- 1911 A. E. H. Love, "on some problems of geodynamics"
- 1913 Samuel McLaren and John William Nicholson
- 1915 Geoffrey Ingram Taylor, "on the turbulent motion in fluids"
- 1917 James Hopwood Jeans, "on the course of configurations possible for a rotating and gravitating fluid mass"
- 1919 John William Nicholson
- 1921 William Mitchinson Hicks
- 1922 Joseph Proudman
- 1924 Ralph H. Fowler
- 1926 Harold Jeffreys
- 1928 Sydney Chapman
- 1930 Abram Samoilovitch Besicovitch
- 1932 Alan Herries Wilson
- 1934 Sydney Goldstein
- 1936 W. V. D. Hodge
- 1940 Harold Davenport
- 1942 Homi J. Bhabha
- 1947 Desmond B. Sawyer
- 1948 John Charles Burkill, Subrahmanyan Chandrasekhar, Walter Hayman, and John Macnaghten Whittaker
- 1950 George Batchelor, William Reginald Dean, and Leslie Howarth
- 1952 Bernhard Neumann
- 1955 Harold Gordon Eggleston
- 1958 Paul Taunton Matthews, Abdus Salam, and John G. Taylor
- 1960 V. S. Huzurbazar and Walter L. Smith
- 1962 John Robert Ringrose
- 1964 James G. Oldroyd and Owen Martin Phillips
- 1966 Stephen Hawking and Roger Penrose
- 1967 Jayant Narlikar
- 1970 Robert Burridge, Leslie John Walpole, and John Raymond Willis
- 1972 Alan Baker, Christopher Hooley, and Hugh Lowell Montgomery
- 1974 John Fitch and David Barton
- 1976 Tim Pedley
- 1978 Alistair Mees
- 1980 Michael E. McIntyre and Brian Leslie Norman Kennett
- 1982 Dan Segal, Martin J. Taylor, Gordon James, Steve Donkin, and Aidan Schofield
- 1984 Bernard J. Carr
- 1986 Brian D. Ripley
- 1992 Paul Glendinning
- 2001 Sandu Popescu
- 2002 Susan Howson, "for her research on number theory and elliptic curves"
- 2003 David Hobson
- 2004 Dominic Joyce
- 2005 Mihalis Dafermos and David Stuart
- 2006 Jonathan Sherratt
- 2007 Paul Fearnhead
- 2008 Tom Bridgeland and David Tong
- 2009 Raphaël Rouquier "for contributions to representation theory"
- 2010 Jacques Vanneste
- 2011 Harald Helfgott and Tom Sanders
- 2012 Sheehan Olver and Françoise Tisseur "for contributions to computational mathematics"
- 2013 Ivan Smith
- 2014 not awarded
- 2015 Arend Bayer and Thomas Coates
- 2016 Clément Mouhot
- 2017 Graham Cormode and Richard Samworth
- 2018 Claudia de Rham and Gustav Holzegel, both of Imperial College London.
- 2019 Heather Harrington (University of Oxford) and Luitgard Veraart (LSE)
- 2020 Konstantin Ardakov (University of Oxford) and Michael Wemyss (University of Glasgow)
- 2021 Mahir Hadžić and Jeffrey Galkowski, both of University College London.
- 2022 Jack Thorne
- 2023 Anne Cori (Imperial College London) and Adam Kucharski (LSHTM)
- 2024 Soheyla Feyzbakhsh (Imperial College London) and Nick Sheridan (University of Edinburgh)
- 2025 Theo Assiotis (University of Edinburgh) and Giuseppe Cannizzaro (University of Warwick)
- 2026 Richard Montgomery (Warwick) and Julian Sahasrabudhe (Cambridge)

== See also ==
- List of mathematics awards
