= Robert Welsted =

Robert Welsted (1671–1735) was an English physician and classical scholar.

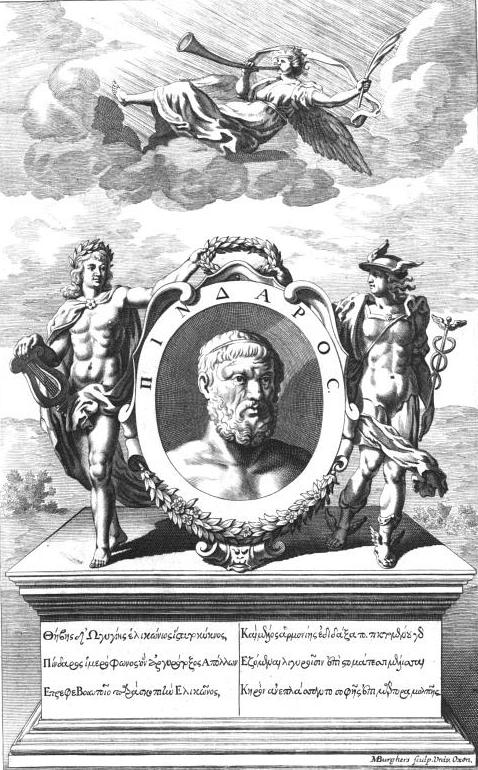
Frontispiece by Michael Burgers of the West and Welsted 1697 edition of Pindar. It included commentaries from Nicolas Lesueur and Erasmus Schmid, followed Schmid's Latin text, and included the paraphrase of Jean Benoît.

== Life ==
He was the son of Leonard Welsted of Bristol. He matriculated from St Edmund Hall, Oxford, on 4 December 1687, and was elected in 1689 to a demyship at Magdalen College, which he held till 1698, graduating B.A. on 25 June 1691, and M.A. on 12 May 1694. He was admitted an extra-licentiate of the London College of Physicians on 11 December 1695. He was then practising medicine at Bristol, where he remained for some years; when he later moved to London, he was admitted a licentiate on 3 September 1710.

Welsted was admitted a Fellow of the Royal Society on 20 March 1718. In his later years his London practice dropped away, and he relied on charity from his friend Hugh Boulter. He died at Tavistock Street, London, on 1 February 1735.

== Works ==
Welsted was the author of:

- De Ætate vergente Liber, London, 1724.
- De adulta Ætate Liber, London, 1725.
- De Medicina Mentis Liber, London, 1726.
- Tentamen de variis Hominum Naturis, London, 1730.
- Tentamen alterum de propriis Naturarum Habitibus, London, 1732.
