= William Hyde Wollaston =

English chemist and physicist (1766–1828)

William Hyde Wollaston FRS
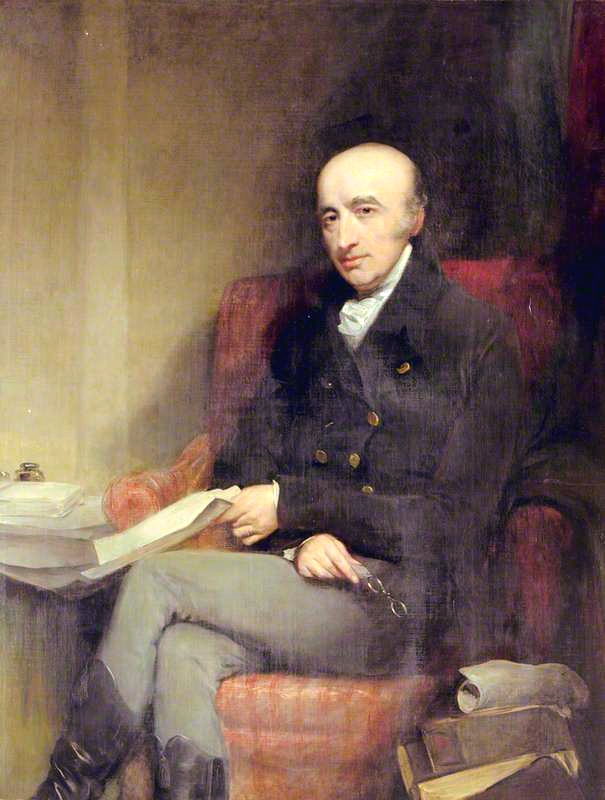
- Portrait by John Jackson
- Born: 6 August 1766; East Dereham, Norfolk, England
- Died: 22 December 1828 (aged 62); Chislehurst, Kent, England
- Education: Gonville and Caius College, Cambridge
- Known for: Coining bicarbonate Camera lucida Conservation of energy Cryophorus; Cystine; Discovery of Fraunhofer lines Discovery of osmium Discovery of palladium Discovery of rhodium Electrochemistry; Wollaston prism Wollaston wire Wollaston landscape lens
- Awards: Copley Medal (1802); Croonian Medal (1809); Royal Medal (1828); Bakerian Medal (1802, 1805, 1818, 1828); Fellow of the Royal Society (1793)
- Scientific career
- Fields: Chemistry; Physics

22nd President of the Royal Society
- In office 1820–1820
- Preceded by: Joseph Banks
- Succeeded by: Humphry Davy

William Hyde Wollaston (/ˈwʊləstən/; 6 August 1766 – 22 December 1828) was an English chemist and physicist who is famous for discovering the chemical elements palladium and rhodium. He also developed a way to process platinum ore into malleable ingots, patented the camera lucida, and made contributions in electricity and spectroscopy.

== Life ==
He was born in East Dereham in Norfolk, the son of Francis Wollaston (1737–1815), a noted amateur astronomer, and his wife Althea Hyde. He was one of 17 children, but the family was financially well-off and he enjoyed an intellectually stimulating environment. He was educated privately (and remotely) at Charterhouse School from 1774 to 1778 then studied Sciences at Gonville and Caius College, Cambridge. In 1793 he obtained his doctorate (MD) in medicine from Cambridge University, and was a Fellow of his college from 1787 to 1828.

He worked as a physician in Huntingdon from 1789 then moved to Bury St Edmunds before moving to London in 1797. During his studies, Wollaston had become interested in chemistry, crystallography, metallurgy and physics. In 1800, after he had received a large sum of money from one of his older brothers, he left medicine. He concentrated on pursuing his interests in chemistry and other subjects outside his trained vocation.

He was elected a Fellow of the Royal Society in 1793, where he became an influential member. He served as its president in 1820. In 1822 he was elected a Foreign Honorary Member of the American Academy of Arts and Sciences.

Wollaston died in London 28 December 1828 and was buried in St Nicholas's Churchyard in Chislehurst, England.

== Work ==
After having established a partnership with Smithson Tennant in 1800 in order to produce and sell chemical products, Wollaston became wealthy by developing the first physico-chemical method for processing platinum ore in practical quantities. He held the details of the process secret until near his death and made huge profits for about 20 years by being the only supplier in England of the product which had many of the same qualities as gold, but was much cheaper.

Chemical analysis related to the process of purifying platinum led Wollaston to discover the elements palladium (symbol Pd) in 1802 and rhodium (symbol Rh) in 1804.

When Anders Gustav Ekeberg discovered tantalum in 1802 Wollaston declared the new element identical with niobium (then known as columbium). Niobium and tantalum bear an unusually close chemical similarity, even among vertically adjacent elements. Heinrich Rose would later prove that columbium and tantalum were indeed different elements and he would rename columbium "niobium" in 1846.

The mineral wollastonite was later named after Wollaston for his contributions to crystallography and mineral analysis.

Wollaston also performed important work in electricity. In 1801, he performed an experiment showing that the electricity from friction was identical to that produced by voltaic piles. During the last years of his life he performed electrical experiments, which resulted in his accidental discovery of electromagnetic induction 10 years prior to Michael Faraday, preceding the eventual design of the electric motor: Faraday constructed the first working electric motor and published his results without acknowledging Wollaston's previous work. Wollaston's demonstration of a motor to the Royal Society had failed, however, but nonetheless his prior work was acknowledged by Humphry Davy in the same paper which lauded Faraday's "ingenious" experiments. Wollaston also invented a battery that allowed the zinc plates in the battery to be raised out of the acid, so that the zinc would not be dissolved as quickly as it would if it were in the battery all the time.

His optical work was important as well, where he is remembered for his observations of Fraunhofer lines in the solar spectrum in 1802, 12 years before von Fraunhofer's observation. This was a key event in the history of spectroscopy. He invented the camera lucida (1807) which contained the Wollaston prism (the four-sided optics of which were first described basically by Kepler) and the reflecting goniometer (1809). He also developed the first lens specifically for camera use, called the meniscus lens, in 1812. The lens was designed to improve the image projected by the camera obscura. By changing the shape of the lens, Wollaston was able to project a flatter image, eliminating much of the distortion that was a problem with many of that day's biconvex lenses.

Wollaston also devised a cryophorus, "a glass container containing liquid water and water vapor. It is used in physics courses to demonstrate rapid freezing by evaporation." He used his Bakerian lecture in 1805, On the Force of Percussion, to defend Gottfried Leibniz's principle of vis viva, an early formulation of the conservation of energy.

Wollaston's attempt to demonstrate the presence of glucose in the blood serum of diabetics was unsuccessful due to the limited means of detection available to him. His 1811 paper "On the non-existence of sugar in the blood of persons labouring under diabetes mellitus" concluded that sugar must travel via lymphatic channels from the stomach directly to the kidneys, without entering the bloodstream. Wollaston supported this theory by referring to the thesis of a young medical student at Edinburgh, named Charles Darwin, titled, "Experiments establishing a criterion between mucaginous and purulent matter. And an account of the retrograde motions of the absorbent vessels of animal bodies in some diseases." The medical student was the uncle of the more famous Charles Robert Darwin.

Wollaston prophetically foretold that if once an accurate knowledge were gained of the relative weights of elementary atoms, philosophers would not rest satisfied with the determination of mere numbers, but would have to gain a geometrical conception of how the elementary particles were placed in space. Jacobus Henricus van 't Hoff's La Chimie dans l'Espace was the first practical realisation of this prophecy.

In 1814 he was the first to estimate the atomic weight of carbon to be 12, calculating it from the relative densities of oxygen and carbon dioxide by Jean-Baptiste Biot and François Arago. However, value of 6 (with an according modification of all chemical formulas to have double the number of C atoms) was more popular well into the 19th century.

Also in 1814, Wollaston was part of a royal commission that recommended adoption of the imperial gallon, and in the same year he coined the name bicarbonate. He served on the government's Board of Longitude between 1818 and 1828 and was part of royal commission that opposed adoption of the metric system (1819).

Wollaston was too ill to deliver his final Bakerian lecture in 1828 and dictated it to Henry Warburton who read it on 20 November.

== Honours and awards ==
Honours and awards

- Fellow of the Royal Society, 1793.
  - Secretary, 1804–1816.
  - President, briefly in 1820.
  - Vice-president, 1820–1828
  - Copley Medal, 1802
  - Royal Medal, 1828.
  - Croonian lecture, 1809
  - Bakerian Lecture, 1802, 1805, 1812, 1828
- Member of the Royal Swedish Academy of Sciences, 1813.

== Legacy ==
The following have been named in his honour:

- Wollaston Medal
  - List of Wollaston Medal recipients
- Wollaston, a lunar impact crater
- Wollaston Lake, Saskatchewan, Canada a 2,681 square kilometre (1,035 sq mi) freshwater lake
- Wollaston Islands, Chile are named for him
- Wollaston Foreland, NE Greenland.
- Wollaston Peninsula, Canada.
- Wollastonite, a chain silicate mineral
- Wollaston wire, extremely fine platinum wire

It has been mentioned that Wollaston has not received the renown which should complement his historical standing in world of science: his contemporaries Thomas Young, Humphry Davy and John Dalton have become far better-known.

Different reasons for this have been suggested, including that Wollaston himself was not systematic or conventional in presenting his discoveries, even publishing anonymously (initially) in the case of Palladium. Also, and perhaps more importantly for his modern legacy, privately held papers of his were inaccessible, and that his notebooks went missing shortly after his death and remained so for over a century; these were finally collated in the late 1960s at Cambridge University and the first comprehensive biography was completed by Melvyn Usselman in 2015, after over 30 years' research.

== Collections ==
University College London holds a collection of papers (primarily 20th century) about Wollaston assembled by Lionel Felix Gilbert, who proposed a biography of Wollaston which was never fully written. The Geological Society of London holds a notebook belonging to Wollaston, and the Royal Society holds correspondence written to Wollaston during his time as President.

== Publications ==
- On the force of percussion, 1805
- Wollaston, William Hyde (1808). "On Super-Acid and Sub-Acid Salts". Phil. Trans. 98: 96–102. doi:10.1098/rstl.1808.0006. S2CID 94866722.

== See also ==
- Coddington magnifier
- Fraunhofer lines
- Pyrognomic
- History of electrochemistry
- List of presidents of the Royal Society
- Chemical crystallography before X-rays
- Geometrical crystallography before X-rays

Professional and academic associations
Preceded by Joseph Banks	22nd President of the Royal Society; 1820	Succeeded by Humphry Davy
