= Jacques Vanneste =

British mathematician

Jacques Vanneste is a professor of mathematics at the University of Edinburgh, whose main research area is fluid dynamics.

His particular research interest is in analytic methods for handling systems with dynamics on two distinct time or length scales. This is relevant, for example, for the interaction between weather and ocean circulation, where fast inertial waves can be generated by slow underlying flows; see for example his work on the tropopause, and his most-cited paper. He is also interested in the dynamics of stirring.

== Awards ==
He is the recipient of the 2010 Adams Prize. In 2014, Vanneste was elected a Fellow of the Royal Society of Edinburgh.
