= Heather Harrington =

American mathematician

- Education: University of Massachusetts Amherst, Imperial College London
- Awards: Whitehead Prize, Adams Prize, Philip Leverhulme Prize
- Scientific career
- Workplaces: University of Oxford, Max Planck Institute of Molecular Cell Biology and Genetics
- Thesis: Mathematical models of cellular decisions (2010)
- Doctoral advisor: Jaroslav Stark, Dorothy Buck
- Website: people.maths.ox.ac.uk/harrington/

Heather A. Harrington (born 1984) is an applied mathematician interested in applied algebra and geometry, dynamical systems, chemical reaction network theory, topological data analysis, and systems biology. Since 2020, she is professor of mathematics and Royal Society University Research Fellow at the Mathematical Institute, University of Oxford, where she heads the Algebraic Systems Biology group. In 2023, she became a director at the Max Planck Institute of Molecular Cell Biology and Genetics, where she is also leading the interinstitutional Center for Systems Biology Dresden (CSBD) together with partners from the Technical University Dresden and the Max Planck Institute for the Physics of Complex Systems.

== Education and career ==
Harrington went to Concord-Carlisle High School in Massachusetts. As an applied mathematics student at the University of Massachusetts Amherst she won a Barry M. Goldwater Scholarship, and graduated summa cum laude from in 2006. She completed her Ph.D. in 2010 at Imperial College London. Her dissertation, Mathematical models of cellular decisions, was jointly supervised by Jaroslav Stark and Dorothy Buck.

After postdoctoral research in theoretical systems biology at Imperial from 2010 to 2013, she joined the Mathematical Institute at Oxford as Hooke Research Fellow and EPSRC Postdoctoral Research Fellow, and as Junior Research Fellow at St Cross College, Oxford. In 2017, she became an associate professor and Royal Society University Research Fellow at Oxford. In 2020, she became professor of mathematics.

She is a board member of the EDGE Foundation (Enhancing Diversity in Graduate Education).

== Recognition ==
In 2018 Harrington was one of the winners of the Whitehead Prize of the London Mathematical Society. She was a co-winner of the 2019 Adams Prize of the University of Cambridge, which had the topic 'The Mathematics of Networks'. She was awarded the Philip Leverhulme Prize in 2020 for advances in analysis of noisy data.

Harrington was named as a SIAM Fellow, in the 2026 class of fellows, "for outstanding contributions to the development of new topological and algebraic methods and their applications to mathematical biology".
