= Richard White (mathematician) =

English mathematician (1590-1682)

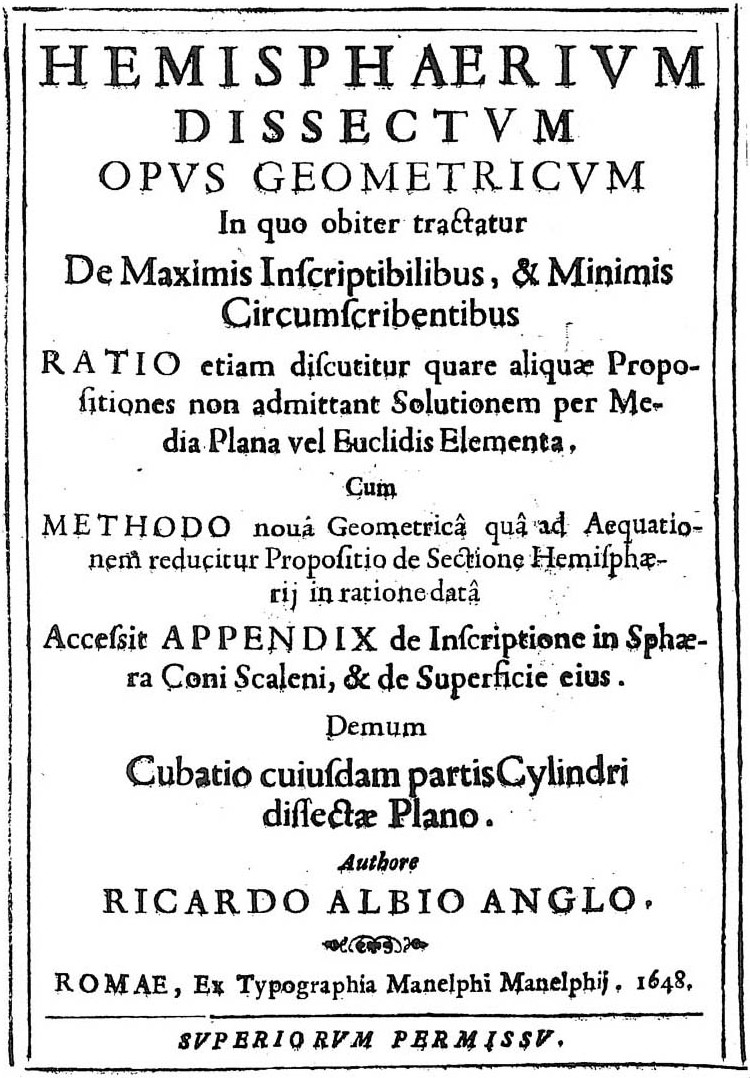
Title page of the 1648 Hemisphaerium Dissectum

Richard White (Latin: Ricardus Albius; 1590 – 1682) was an English mathematician and physicist.

A Catholic from Essex, he studied under Benedetto Castelli in Pisa and lived mostly in Italy. His brother, Thomas White was a Roman Catholic theologian and scholar. He married Catherine Weston, daughter of the Earl of Portland.

In the preface of his book Hemisphaerium Dissectum, printed in Rome with the Inquisition's permission, he wrote with great admiration of Galileo Galilei. He also had with Galileo a friendly correspondence by letter.

White was proposed for election to the Philosophical Society in June 1661, and was elected on 26 June 1661. However, he was not re-elected after the second charter in 1663 and is not listed as an original fellow of the Royal Society.

== Works ==
- Hemisphaerium Dissectum, Opus Geometricum (in Latin). Rome: Manelfo Manelfi. 1648.
