= John Macnaghten Whittaker =

British mathematician (1905–1984)

John Macnaghten Whittaker FRS FRSE LLD (7 March 1905 – 29 January 1984) was a British mathematician and Vice-Chancellor of the University of Sheffield from 1953 to 1965.

== Life ==
Whittaker was born 7 March 1905 in Cambridge, the son of mathematician Edmund Taylor Whittaker and his wife, Mary Ferguson Macnaghten Boyd (grand-daughter of Thomas Jamieson Boyd).

He was educated at St Salvator's School in St Andrews then Fettes College in Edinburgh. He then studied Maths and Physics at Edinburgh University from the age of 15, graduating MA in 1924. He followed this by three years at Trinity College, Cambridge, gaining a second MA in 1927.

In 1927 started his academic career as an assistant lecturer in Mathematics at Edinburgh University. In 1928 he was elected a Fellow of the Royal Society of Edinburgh. His proposers were Ralph Allan Sampson, Charles Glover Barkla, Sir Charles Galton Darwin and George James Lidstone.

He was awarded a doctorate (DSc) in 1929, followed by a fellowship at Pembroke College, Cambridge, before becoming a professor of pure mathematics at Liverpool University in 1933.

During the Second World War he served with the Royal Artillery including time in the 8th Army on Field-Marshal Montgomery's staff in Egypt and Tunisia 1942/43. In 1944/45 he was Scientific Advisor to the Army Council and rose to the rank of Lt Colonel.

After the war he returned to Liverpool, becoming Dean of Science, then in 1953 moved to Sheffield to take up the post of Vice-Chancellor of the university. During his office the University expanded from 2500 to 7000 students, requiring the appointment of many new staff and the construction of many buildings. However, he also had to oversee the first closure of an English university department, the Department of Mining. His office covered the centenary celebration of the University in 1955, including a visit by queen Elizabeth II. He retired from this position in 1965, and was honoured by being given the Freedom of the City of Sheffield.

In retirement he expanded his other interests in art and archeology, collecting watercolours and Persian antiques. He died 29 January 1984.

== Family ==
In 1933 he married Iona Mhari Natalie Elliott: they had two sons.

== Work and honours ==
There were early papers (1926–28) on quantum theory, but his main work was on complex analysis. J. M. Whittaker also made some significant development in the cardinal function theory of his father, E. T. Whittaker. In 1948 he won the Adams Prize, jointly with John Charles Burkill, Subrahmanyan Chandrasekhar, and Walter Hayman. In 1949 J. M. Whittaker was elected a Fellow of the Royal Society, an honour already held by his father – they were the only parent and child to have this simultaneously.

== Publications ==
- Interpolatory function theory. Cambridge University Press. 1935; vii+107 pp. 2nd edn. New York: Stechert-Hafner. 1964.
- Series of Polynomials. Cairo: Fouad I University, Faculty of Science. 1943.
- Sur les Séries de Base de Polynomes Quelconques. Paris: Gauthier-Villars. 1949.

== See also ==
- Abel–Goncharov interpolation

Academic offices
Preceded by Irvine Masson	Vice-Chancellor of the University of Sheffield; 1953–1965	Succeeded by Arthur Roy Clapham
