= Alan Herries Wilson =

British physicist and industrialist (1906–1995)

- Wilson in 1969 by Godfrey Argent
- Born: July 2, 1906; Wallasey, England
- Died: September 30, 1995 (aged 89)
- Known for: Electronic band structure
- Children: 2
- Awards: Adams Prize (1932)
- Scientific career
- Fields: Solid state physics
- Workplaces: Cambridge University

Sir Alan Herries Wilson FRS (2 July 1906 – 30 September 1995), was a British mathematical physicist and industrialist. He developed the electronic band structure theory of solids to distinguish between conductors, insulator and semiconductors. After World War II, he left academic research to pursue a career in industry.

== Life ==
=== Early life ===
Alan Herries Wilson was born in 1906 in Wallasey, Cheshire, England, from a Scottish family.

He was educated at Wallasey Grammar School and at Emmanuel College, Cambridge, obtaining a BA degree in mathematics in 1926. His graduate work was under the supervision of R. H. Fowler working on problems in quantum mechanics.

=== Band theory ===
He studied with Werner Heisenberg on the application of quantum mechanics to electrical conduction in metals and semiconductors. During the period 1931–1932 Wilson formulated the electronic band theory explaining how energy bands of electrons can make a material a conductor, a semiconductor, or an insulator. In 1932 he was awarded the Adams Prize; the essay he wrote for this prize became the basis for his book The Theory of Metals published in 1936. His book Semi-conductors and Metals was published in 1939. Wilson supervised four graduate students in the study of solid-state physics during the 1930s, but Wilson perceived that interest in the field was small at Cambridge and so switched to the study of nuclear physics and cosmic rays.

Wilson was elected a Fellow of the Royal Society in 1942 for his work in advancing the theory of conduction in metals and semiconductors. During the World War II he worked on radio communications problems for the Special Operation Executive (SOE), and was later attached to the British Tube Alloys project to develop the atomic bomb.

=== Private sector ===
After the war he left academic research and became an industrialist, joining British textile company Courtaulds to supervise their research and development of artificial fibres. He continued his interest in mathematical physics and prepared the second edition of The Theory of Metals in 1953. He published Thermodynamics and Statistical Mechanics in 1957. Wilson served as the second President of the combined Institute of Physics and the Physical Society from 1962 to 1964. In 1962 he left Courtaulds due in part to a takeover bid by ICI and joined Glaxo, a pharmacy company, becoming chairman in 1963 until his retirement in 1973. During Wilson's time at Glaxo the company was successful in greatly expanding its business. Wilson was knighted in 1961.

== Private life ==
He was married in 1934 to Margaret Monks (Constance) (1908 – 8 June 1961), with two sons.

Coat of arms of Alan Herries Wilson

Motto
Esse Quam Videri

== Honors ==
There is now an Alan Wilson Research Fellowship at Emmanuel College.
