= Edward Walker (mathematician) =

- Born: c. 1820; Gestingthorpe, Essex, UK
- Died: 2 March 1893; Shepherd's Bush, London
- Education: Trinity College, Cambridge
- Awards: Adams Prize (1865)

Edward Walker FRS (c. 1820 – 2 March 1893) was an English applied mathematician and theoretical physicist.

He graduated from Trinity College, Cambridge with B.A. (8th Wrangler) in 1844 and M.A. in 1847. At Trinity College he was a Fellow in 1845 and an assistant Tutor in 1846–1847. He won the Adams Prize in 1865 and was elected F.R.S. on 3 June 1869. He was called to the bar at Inner Temple on 17 November 1868.

On 30 September 1847 he married Anne Whinfield at St. James's Church, Norlands, Bayswater. The marriage produced several children.
