= Gabriel Waksman =

British biologist

Gabriel Waksman is a British biologist who is Courtauld professor of biochemistry and molecular biology at University College London (UCL), and professor of structural and molecular biology at Birkbeck College, University of London. He is the director of the Institute of Structural and Molecular Biology (ISMB) at UCL and Birkbeck, head of the Department of Structural and Molecular Biology at UCL, and head of the Department of Biological Sciences at Birkbeck.

== Research ==
Waksman's laboratory studies the structures and mechanisms of large nanomachines involved in bacterial secretion with particular emphasis on pilus biogenesis by the Chaperone-Usher pathway and on Type IV Secretion (T4S) Systems. The Waksman laboratory primarily uses X-ray Crystallography and Electron Microscopy to determine 3D structures as well as biochemical and biophysical techniques to uncover the mechanisms used by these nanomachines.

== T4S systems ==
These systems are present in both Gram-negative and Gram-positive bacteria. They form multi-megadalton machines embedded in membranes and are responsible for the secretion of both proteins and nucleic acid substrates. They play major roles in pathogenicity of, for example, Helicobacter pylori, the causative agent of ulcers. They also mediate transfer of plasmid DNAs during conjugation, a process that leads to the spread of antibiotics resistance genes. T4S systems are composed of 12 proteins named VirB1-11 and VirD4 that assemble into a formidable nanomachine of more than 3 megadalton in size and spanning the 2 membranes of Gram-negative bacteria.

== Pilus biogenesis ==
Bacterial pili are hair-like surface-exposed organelles. They are responsible for recognition of and attachment to the host and thus, are also crucial virulence factors. Pili are polymer of protein subunits, the assembly of which requires accessory proteins. The Waksman lab engages in research on pili assembled by the Chaperone-Usher (CU) pathway. (CU) pili have clear relevance in the pathogenicity of uropathogenic Escherichia coli, where CU pili mediate bacterial tropism to the bladder to cause cystitis or to the kidney to cause pyolenephritis. CU pili require two accessory proteins for biogenesis: a chaperone that stabilises pilus subunits and ferries them to an assembly platform, the usher, the second accessory protein required in this system. The usher is an extraordinary molecular nanomachine embedded in the outer membrane. It drives subunit recruitment, polymerisation and secretion.

== Education and career ==
Waksman obtained his PhD in Fundamental Biochemistry at the University of Paris in 1982 and after military service in Ivory Coast, worked for Rhone Poulenc Agrochimie as staff scientist. In 1987, he left the company to work as a postdoctoral assistant at Bristol University and the University of Sheffield, and in 1991, moved to the USA to work as a postdoctoral associate in the laboratory of Professor John Kuriyan.

In 1993, Waksman set up his independent laboratory at the Washington University in St. Louis in the Department of Biochemistry and Molecular Biophysics where, in 2000, he was appointed the first Roy and Diana Vagelos endowed Professor of Biochemistry and Molecular Biophysics at Washington University School of Medicine. In 2002, he moved to London to set up the Institute of Structural and Molecular Biology.

== Recognition ==
- Elected member of European Molecular Biology Organization (EMBO) in 2007
- Elected fellow of the Academy of Medical Sciences in 2008
- Elected fellow of the Royal Society in 2012
- Elected a member of the German Academy of Sciences Leopoldina in 2013
