= Charlton Wollaston =

English physician

Charlton Wollaston (1733–1764) was an English medical doctor, physician to Guy's Hospital from 1762. He was also physician to the Queen's Household.

He was a son of Francis Wollaston (1694–1774), and entered Sidney Sussex College, Cambridge in 1748. He graduated M.B. in 1753, and M.D. in 1758. He was elected a Fellow of the Royal Society in 1756, and was Harveian Orator in 1763.

== Family ==
Wollaston married in 1758 Phyllis Byam. Charlton Byam Wollaston (1765–1840), Assistant Judge Advocate, was their son.
