= Wilhelmus Wilhelmius =

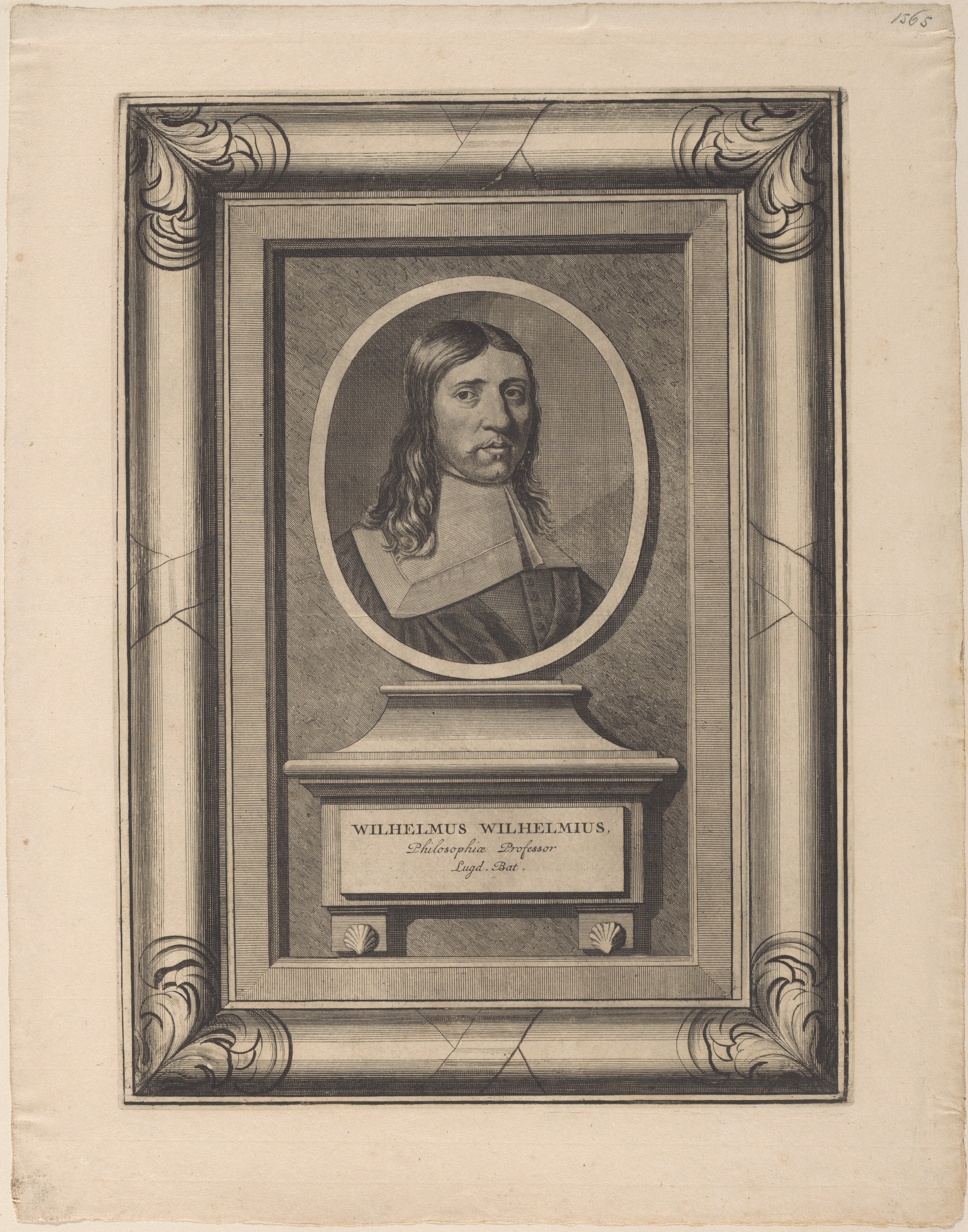
Wilhelmus Wilhelmius

Wilhelmus Wilhelmius (1720–1771) was a Dutch minister, mathematician and philosopher.

== Life ==
He was baptised on 19 March 1720 in Rotterdam, son of Johannes Wilhelmius, a minister, and grandson of the philosopher Wilhelmus Wilhelmius the Elder. He matriculated at the University of Leiden in 1735, and graduated at the University of Utrecht in 1739. His dissertation, under Joseph Serrurier, was on the mind-body problem.

In 1742 he travelled to England and became a Fellow of the Royal Society, with an introduction from Petrus van Musschenbroek. On his return in 1743 he became a minister in Lekkerkerk. After some other positions he settled in Middelburg in 1749.

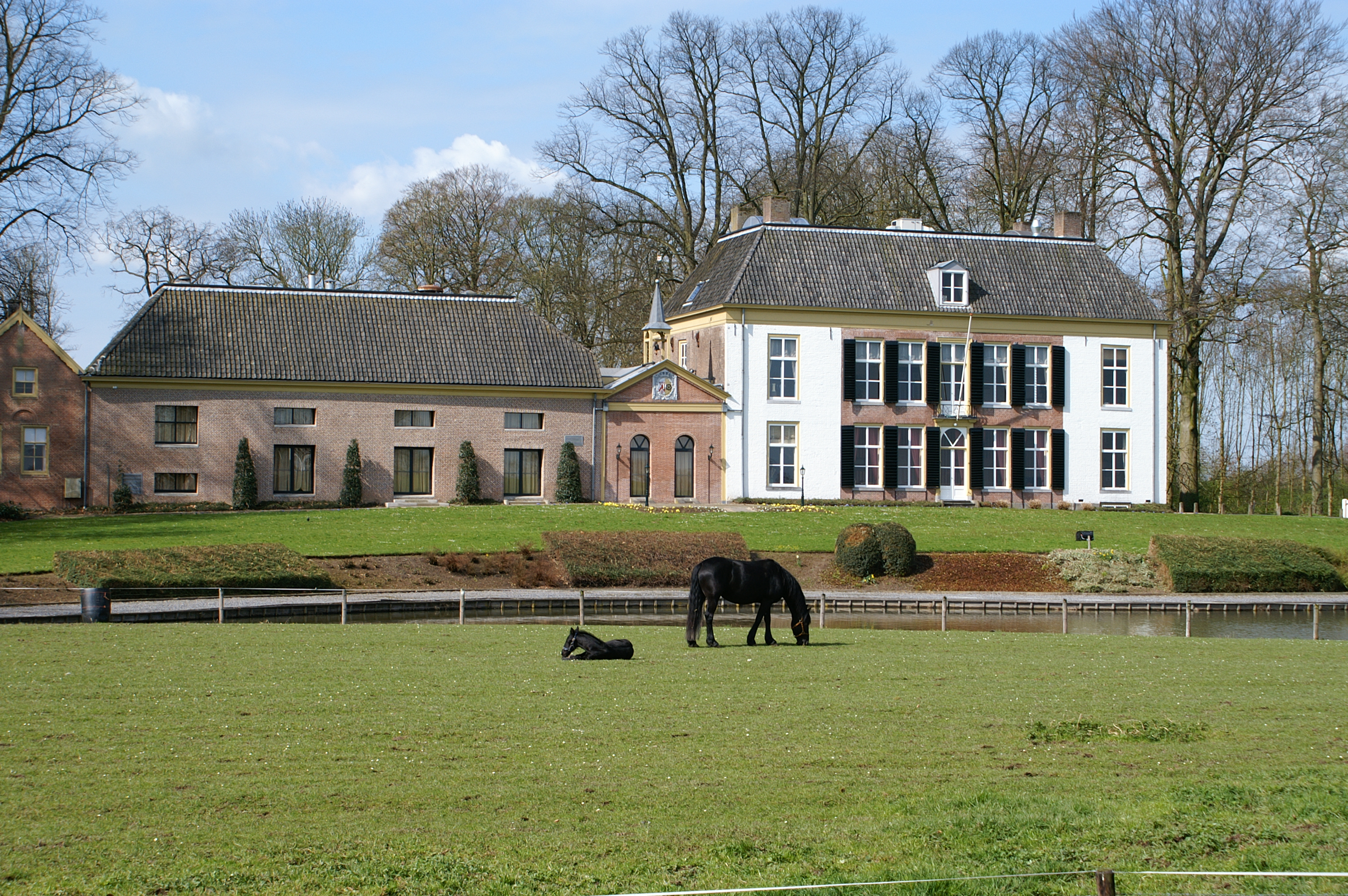
Huis Brakel, built by Wilhelmus Wilhelmius and his wife Aletta.

He married Aletta Maria van den Brande in 1751, and she brought him a large fortune. They bought an estate at Brakel.
