= George Wollaston =

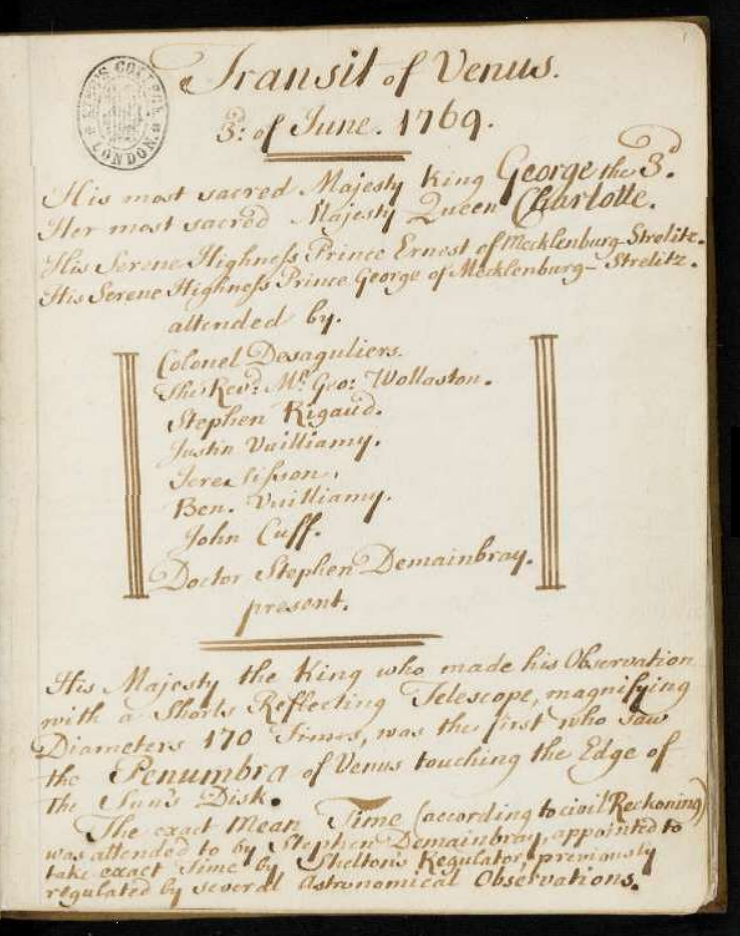
Extract from Observations on the Transit of Venus, a manuscript notebook from the collections of George III, showing Wollaston's presence at the 1769 Transit of Venus observations at the King's Observatory in Richmond-upon-Thames.

George Wollaston (1738–1826) was an English Anglican priest. He was elected a Fellow of the Royal Society in 1763.

He was the son of Francis Wollaston (1694-1774). He was educated at Charterhouse School and Sidney Sussex College, Cambridge, where he graduated second wrangler in 1758. He married in 1765 Elizabeth Palmer of Thurnscoe Hall and they had a single daughter Elizabeth Palmer Wollaston who died in infancy (17 April 1766).
