= Francis Wollaston (scientist) =

Francis Wollaston (6 June 1694, in London – 27 December 1774) was an English scientist. He was elected a Fellow of the Royal Society in 1723. Wollaston was the third son of William Wollaston. He was educated at Sidney Sussex College, Cambridge.

== Family ==
He married Mary Fauquier, daughter of John Francis Fauquier and sister of Lt. Gov. Francis Fauquier of Virginia Colony, in 1728 and they had the following children:

- Mary Wollaston (1730–1813) married William Heberden
- Francis Wollaston (1731–1815), priest and astronomer
- Charlton Wollaston (1733–1764), physician
- William Henry Wollaston, (1737–1759)
- George Wollaston (1738–1826) (FRS)
