= Francis Wollaston (astronomer) =

British astronomer and priest

- Born: 23 November 1731; London, UK
- Died: 31 October 1815 (aged 83)
- Scientific career
- Fields: Astronomy

Francis Wollaston (23 November 1731 in London – 31 October 1815) was a British astronomer and Church of England priest. He was elected a Fellow of the Royal Society in 1769.

== Life ==
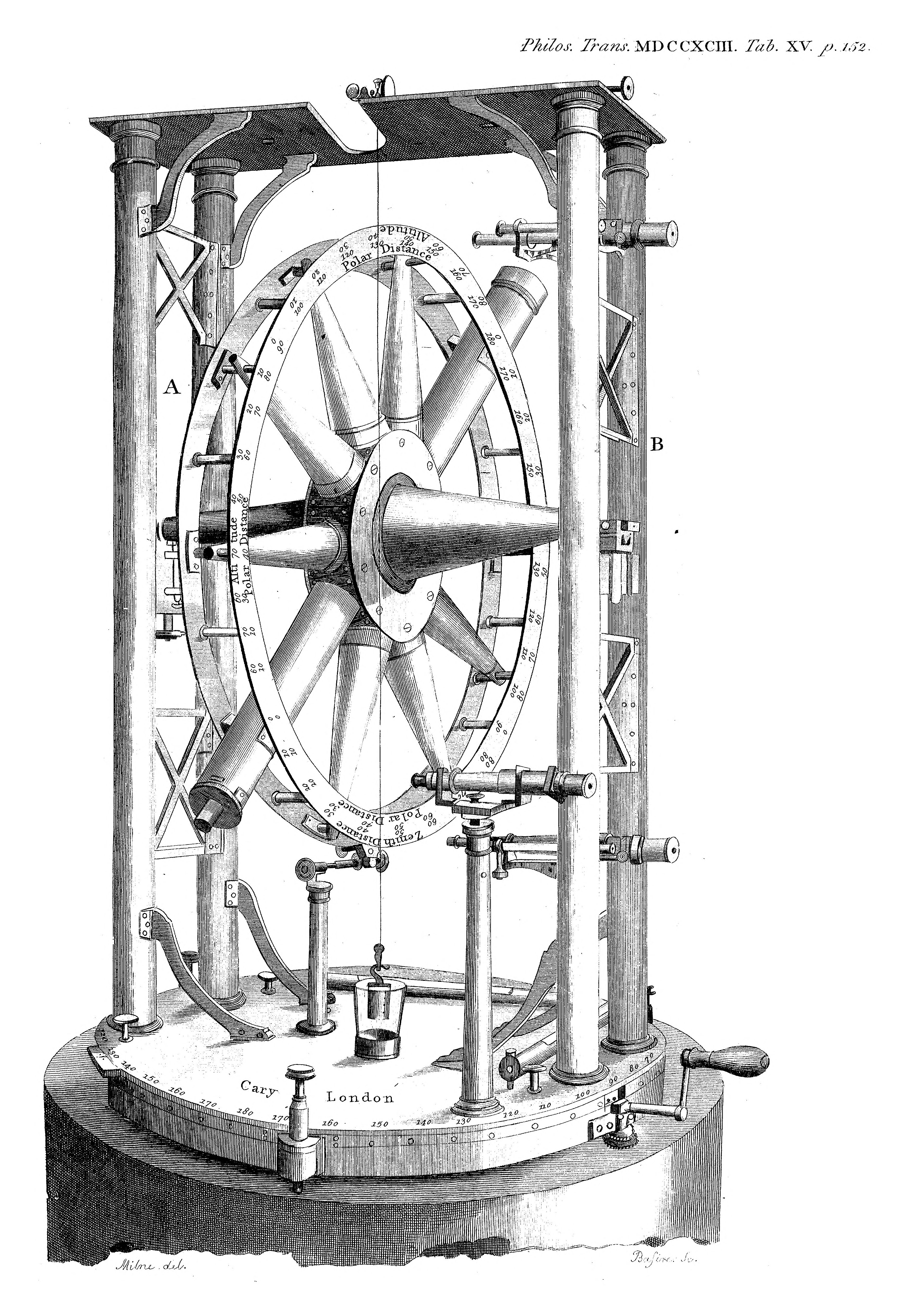
Wollaston's Transit Instrument for determining the position of celestial objects as they pass the meridian

Wollaston was the son of Francis Wollaston (1694–1774) and his wife Mary Fauquier. He was educated privately and at Sidney Sussex College, Cambridge, where he graduated LL.B. in 1754. Though admitted to Lincoln's Inn in 1750, Wollaston was never called to the bar, but became a clergyman. Ordained deacon in 1754 and priest in 1755, he became Rector of Dengie in 1758. From 1761 to 1769 he was Rector and Vicar of East Dereham, and from 1769 to 1815 Rector of Chislehurst.

Wollaston wrote a rare privately printed autobiography The Secret History of a Private Man. In it, he explains that his pursuit of astronomy was intended to separate him at a "distance from the misrepresentations of narrow minded biggots." He had a private observatory with a triplet telescope by Peter Dollond. He was buried at Chislehurst.

He achieved some distinction as an astronomer, becoming a member of the Royal Society in 1769 and later serving on its council. He also produced a catalogue of stars and nebulae in 1789, which was used by many including his friend William Herschel. The catalogue seems to include an observation of an outburst of the nova T Coronae Borealis in 1787, 79 years before its first recognised outburst.

== Beliefs ==
Wollaston was suspected of unorthodox beliefs, perhaps Unitarianism, a denial of the Trinity. His actual belief, which he kept secret, was much more distinctive. It was that "the Archangel Michael had created mankind and was subsequently incarnated as Jesus".

== Family ==
He married Althea Hyde, daughter of John Hyde, in 1758 and they had many children:

- Mary Hyde Wollaston (1760–1843), married, in 1803, William Panchen, vicar of St Mary and St Benedict, Huntingdon
- Althea Hyde Wollaston (1760–1785), married Thomas Heberden (1754–1843), a priest and canon of Exeter Cathedral
- Francis John Hyde Wollaston (1762–1823), philosopher
- Charlotte Hyde Wollaston (1763–1835)
- Katherine Hyde Wollaston (1764–1844), conchologist
- George Hyde Wollaston (1765–1841)
- William Hyde Wollaston (1766–1828), physiologist, chemist, and physicist
- Henrietta Hyde Wollaston (1767–1840)
- Anna Hyde Wollaston (1769–1828), unmarried
- Frederick Hyde Wollaston (1770–1839?; went to America in 1796)
- Louisa Hyde Wollaston (1771–1772)
- Charles Hyde Wollaston (1772–1850)
- Henry Hyde Wollaston (1774), died in infancy
- Amelia Hyde Wollaston (1775–1860)
- Henry Septimus Hyde Wollaston (1776–1867), married Maria Anna Blanckenhagen, the daughter of a well-known merchant family originating from the Baltic.
- Sophia Hyde Wollaston (1777–1810), unmarried
- Louisa Decima Hyde Wollaston (1778–1854), married James Leonard Jackson, a priest from Dorsetshire
- unknown child
- unknown child
