= Richard Richardson (botanist) =

English physician, botanist and antiquarian

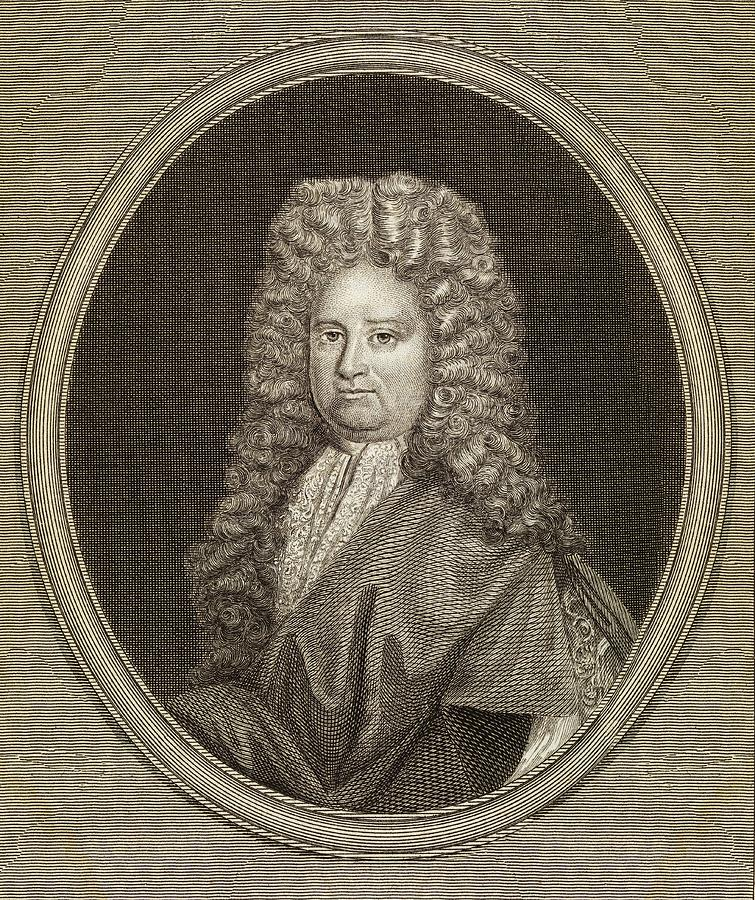
Richard Richardson

Richard Richardson (1663–1741) was an English physician, botanist and antiquarian. He became a Fellow of the Royal Society in 1712.

== Life ==
Born at North Bierley on 6 September 1663, and baptised at Bradford on 24 September, he was the eldest son of William Richardson of North Bierley (1629–1667), who married at Elland in Halifax on 2 August 1659 Susannah (d. 1708), daughter of Gilbert Savile of Greetland. His father died intestate.

Richardson was educated at Bradford Grammar School, and on 20 June 1681 matriculated at University College, Oxford. He left without a degree. On 10 November 1681 he was entered as a student at Gray's Inn. He matriculated at Leyden University on 26 September 1687, and lodged for three years with Paul Hermann, the professor of botany; Herman Boerhaave was among his fellow-students. When he returned to England and settled on his property, he practised as M.D.: most of his professional services were free.

With ample means, Richardson travelled in England, Wales, and Scotland in search of botanical specimens, particularly cryptogams. He dealt with collectors such as Samuel Brewer and Thomas Knowlton. His renowned garden on his estate at North Bierley was well stocked. He planted a seedling cedar of Lebanon, sent to him by Sir Hans Sloane, at Bierley Hall. His garden had noted water features, and an early hothouse where he grew exotic fruits.

On close terms with Ralph Thoresby, Richardson corresponded with Sloane, Dillenius, Jan Frederik Gronovius, James Petiver, and other prominent botanists and antiquarians. He was elected a Fellow of the Royal Society in 1712.

Richardson died at Bierley on 21 April 1741, and was, as he had directed, buried in Cleckheaton chapel in Birstall, which he had rebuilt. A monument with a Latin inscription was erected to his memory.

== Works ==
Richardson's Latin thesis De Febre Tertiana for a doctor's degree at Leyden on 13 March 1690 was printed, with a dedication to Richard Thornton. He contributed to the Royal Society's Philosophical Transactions papers on antiquities in Lancashire and Yorkshire. His letter to Thomas Hearne, on some Yorkshire antiquities, was printed in Hearne's edition of John Leland's Itinerary (ed. 1712, ix. 142–9); he allowed Hearne to print several manuscripts in his possession.

== Legacy ==
Frances Mary Richardson Currer, a descendant (see below) to whom passed the Richardson and Currer estates, inherited Richardson's library of botanical and historical works. She owned the two manuscript indexes which he drew up, one in 1696 and the other in 1737, of the plants in his garden. She also had much of his correspondence.

Many other letters went to the Sloane Collection in the British Library, and the Royal Society. Letters to and from him were printed by John Nichols and John Edward Smith. Dawson Turner edited for Francis Currer, in 1835, a privately printed volume of Extracts from the Literary and Scientific Correspondence of Richard Richardson, M.D.

Dillenius singled out Richardson and William Sherard for botanical investigations that enlarged the list of English plants, and determined the habitats of specimens. He also mentioned Richardson's services in collecting mosses. Linnæus called a plant after him.

== Family ==
Richardson married, at Luddenden chapel in Halifax on 9 February 1700, Sarah, only daughter and heiress of John Crossley of Kershaw House, Halifax. She died in childbed on 21 October 1702, and was buried in Bradford church on 25 October. An infant son did not long survive.

His second wife, whom he married at Kildwick in Craven on 27 December 1705, was Dorothy, second daughter of Henry Currer. She was born in 1687, died on 5 January 1763, and was buried in Cleckheaton chapel. Of her twelve children, seven survived. Of the sons, Richard Richardson the younger (1708–1781) had building work carried out on Bierley Hall, and a chapel added on the estate. A daughter, Dorothy, married Sir John Lister Kaye, 4th Baronet.

Rev. Henry Richardson (1758–1784), later known as Henry Richardson Currer, was a grandson, being the son of Rev. Henry Richardson (died 1778), rector of Thornton-in-Craven, son of Richard Richardson. Frances Mary Richardson Currer, heiress to the Currer and Richardson estates, was his posthumous daughter. Dorothy Richardson (1748–1819), sister of Henry (1758–1784), had artistic and antiquarian interests, and left travel journals.
