= Samuel Brewer =

English botanist

- Died: Bierley, Yorkshire
- Resting place: Whitechapel Church, Cleckheaton
- Scientific career
- Fields: Botany

Samuel Brewer (1670–1743), was an English botanist and contemporary of Dr. Richard Richardson. He is credited with discovering certain species of plant.

== Life ==
Brewer was a native of Trowbridge in Wiltshire, where he possessed a small estate, and was engaged in the woolen manufacture, but seems to have been unsuccessful in business. He communicated some plants to Dillenius for the third edition of John Ray's Synopsis, published in 1724, and accompanied the editor in 1726 from Trowbridge to the Mendips, and from there to Bristol, passing onward to North Wales and Anglesey. Brewer remained in Bangor for more than a year, botanising with Rev. W. Green and W. Jones, and sending dried plants to Dillenius, particularly mosses, thus clearing up many doubtful points.

== Yorkshire ==
In the autumn of 1727 he went to Yorkshire, living at Bingley, and afterwards at Bierley, near Dr. Richard Richardson, who befriended him. The loss of £20,000 of his own earnings, and of a large estate left to him by his father, which was taken by his elder brother, gave a morbid tone to his letters: the editor of Richardson's correspondence says of them: "The same unhappy tone of mind and the same botanical zeal, run through all."

Brewer's son was sent to India through the influence of Dr. James Sherard of Eltham, but the father quarrelled with the doctor in 1731 about some plants. His daughter also seems to have acted 'undutifully' towards him. He had a small house and garden at Bierley, and devoted himself to the culture of plants. Afterwards he became head-gardener to the Duke of Beaufort at Badminton.

He died at Bierley, at Mr. John Pollard's house where he was buried close to the east wall of Cleckheaton chapel. Although unfortunate in business, he was a good collector of plants, insects, and birds; the botanical genus Breweria was founded by Robert Brown in his honour, and a species of rock-rose, a native of North Wales, discovered by him, bears the name of Helianthemum breweri. (Note: Now considered a junior synonym of Tuberaria guttata)
