= Radcliffe Camera =

University library building in Oxford, United Kingdom

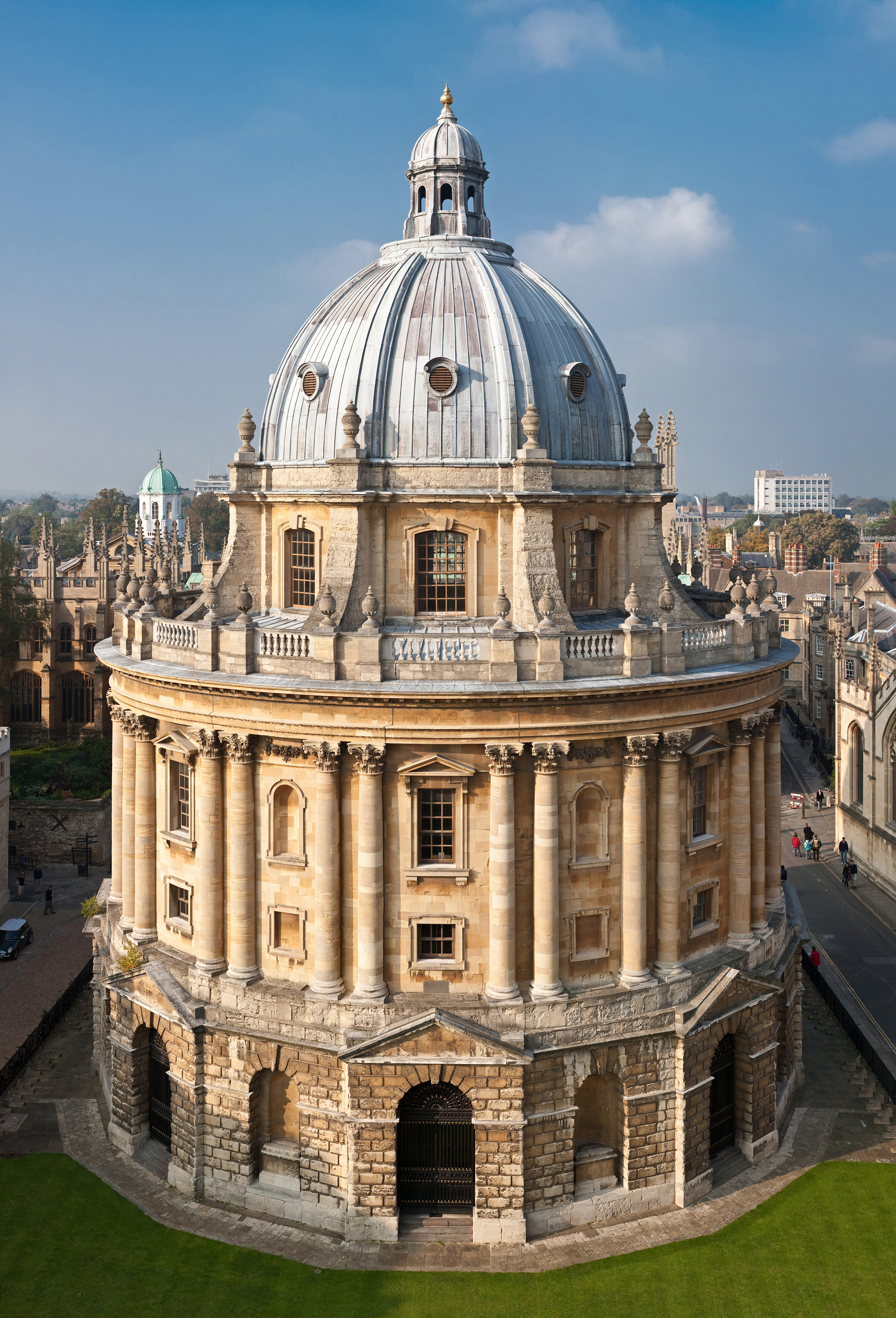
- Radcliffe Camera, viewed from the University Church

- Location within Oxford city centre
- Former names: Physics Library
- Alternative names: Rad Cam or Radders or The Camera (colloquial)

General information
- Type: Academic library
- Architectural style: English Palladian style
- Location: Radcliffe Square, Oxford
- Coordinates: 51.7534°N 1.2539°W
- Construction started: 17 May 1737
- Completed: 1748; 278 years ago
- Inaugurated: 13 April 1749
- Owner: University of Oxford

Technical details
- Floor count: 2 plus a mezzanine

Design and construction
- Architect: James Gibbs

The Radcliffe Camera (colloquially known as the "Rad Cam" or "The Camera"; from Latin camera, meaning 'chamber') is a building of the University of Oxford, England, designed by James Gibbs in a Baroque style and built in 1737–49 to house a library, ultimately becoming a reading room of the Bodleian Library, not open to the public, after the original library moved out.

It is sited to the south of the Old Bodleian, north of the Church of St Mary the Virgin, and between Brasenose College to the west and All Souls College to the east. The Radcliffe Camera's circularity, its position in the heart of Oxford, and its separation from other buildings make it the focal point of the University of Oxford, and as such it is almost always included in shorthand visual representations of the university.

The library's construction and maintenance was funded from the estate of John Radcliffe, a physician who left £40,000 upon his death in 1714; the library was not ready to open until 1749.

Until 1810, the library housed books covering a wide range of subjects, but under George Williams it was brought up to date from a state of neglect, and focus narrowed to the sciences, although by 1850 the Radcliffe Library still lagged behind the Bodleian. At this point librarian Henry Wentworth Acland arranged for the Radcliffe Library building to merge with the university, and the library's collection to be moved, ultimately to the newly constructed Radcliffe Science Library, a legal deposit member of the Bodleian Libraries; the building became known as the Radcliffe Camera, and used as a reading room for the Bodleian, to which it is connected by a tunnel, and an underground book store.

== History ==
=== Background ===
John Radcliffe (c.1650–1714) attended University College from the age of thirteen, becoming a fellow of Lincoln College at eighteen. In a successful medical career, his patients included William III and Queen Anne. He built up a large fortune and died childless. He is buried in St. Mary's Church, Oxford.

It was known that he intended to build a library in Oxford at least two years before his death in 1714. It was thought that the new building would be an extension westwards of the Selden End of the Bodleian Library. Francis Atterbury, Dean of Christ Church, writing in December 1712 describes plans for a 90 ft room on the site of neighbouring Exeter College, and that the lower storey would be a library for Exeter College and the upper story Radcliffe's Library.

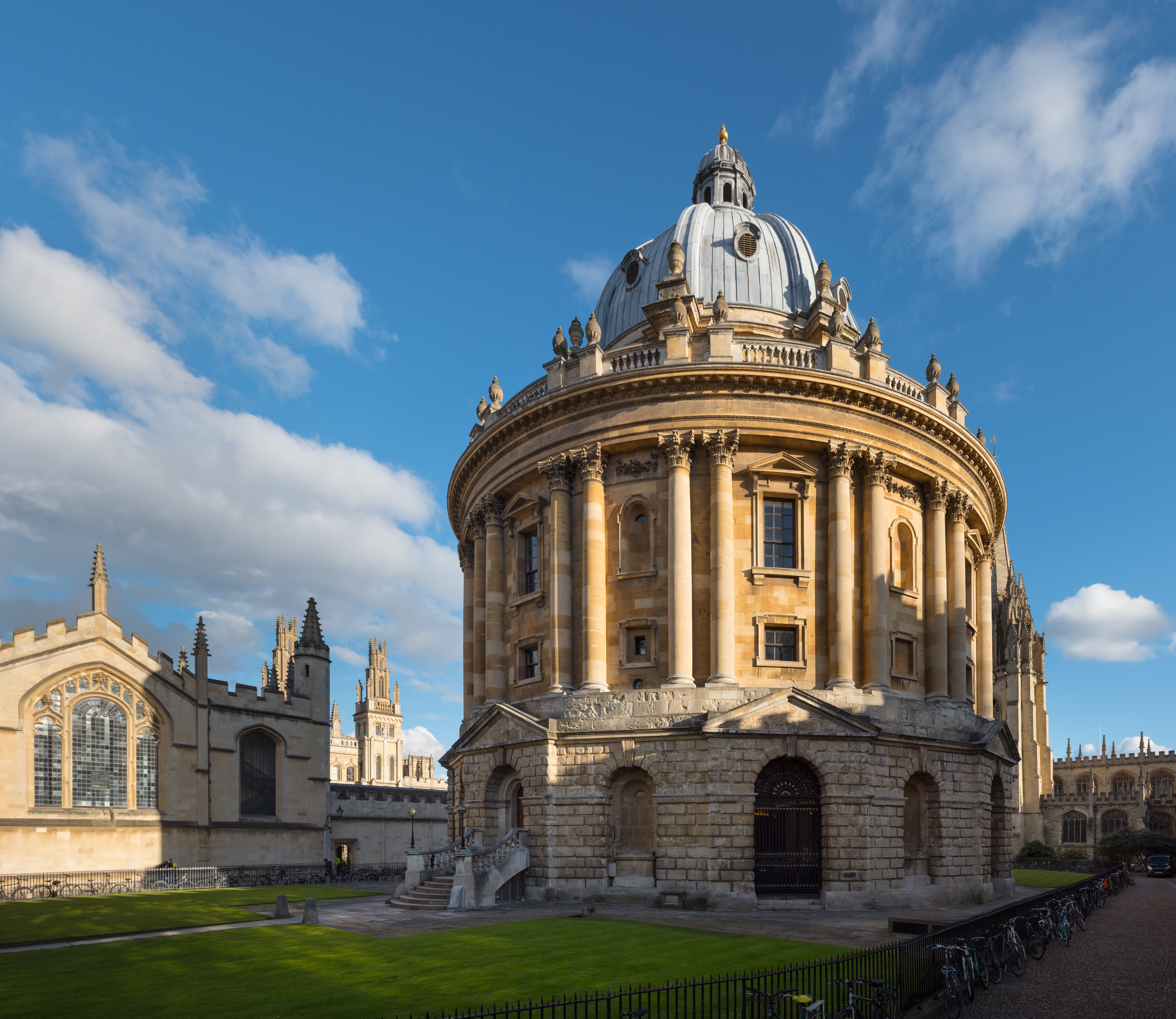
Radcliffe Camera from street level in Radcliffe Square

Radcliffe dedicated £100 a year to furnishing his proposed library with books. Plans were prepared by Nicholas Hawksmoor and are now held in the Ashmolean Museum. By 1714, however, Radcliffe had settled on a different site for his new library, to the south of the existing Bodleian. William Pittis, Radcliffe's first biographer, ascribes the change of heart to excessive demands from the Rector and Fellows of Exeter College.

=== Plans ===
Radcliffe died on 1 November 1714. His will, proved on 8 December, provided for the building of a new library on the new site, stating:

And will that my executors pay forty thousand pounds in the terme of ten years, by yearly payments of four thousand pounds, the first payment thereof to begin and be made after the decease of my said two sisters for the building a library in Oxford and the purchaseing the houses between St Maries and the scholes in Catstreet where I intend the Library to be built, and when the said Library is built I give one hundred and fifty pounds per annum for ever to the Library Keeper thereof for the time being and one hundred pounds a year per annum for ever for buying books for the same Library.

It also provided £100 a year to maintain the new library, but only once 30 years had elapsed from his death. The library-keeper was to be chosen by several influential figures: the Archbishop of Canterbury, the Lord Chancellor, the Chancellor of the University of Oxford, the Bishop of London and the Bishop of Winchester, the Home Secretary and Foreign Secretary, the Lord Chief Justice of the King's Bench and the Lord Chief Justice of the Common Pleas, and the Master of the Rolls. The first payment was to be made after the death of Radcliffe's two sisters, Hannah Redshaw and Millicent Radcliffe. The latter lived until 1736, although it appears between the death of Redshaw in 1716 and Millicent Radcliffe in 1736, much preparatory work was done acquiring the site for the library.

Radcliffe Camera Act 1720
- Act of Parliament
- Parliament of Great Britain
- Long title: An Act to enable any Corporations within the University of Oxford, or any other Persons, to sell and convey any Messuages and Ground within the said University, for building a Library, pursuant to the Will of John Radcliffe Doctor in Physic; and for empowering any Colleges in the said University to sell or convey any Ground or Houses to each other, for the Purposes therein mentioned.
- Citation: 7 Geo. 1. St. 1. c. 13 Pr.
- Territorial extent: Great Britain

Dates
- Royal assent: 7 June 1721
- Commencement: 8 December 1720 (Note: Start of session.)

Status: Current legislation

Text of statute as originally enacted

A number of tenement houses fronting Catte Street, built right up to the schools, some gardens, Brasenose College outbuildings and Black Hall occupied the site required for the library. A number of colleges became involved in the development of the site. An added problem was that Brasenose required an equal amount of land fronting High Street in return for the land they were being asked to give up. As a consequence, the trustees had to negotiate with the owners and the tenants of the houses. The Radcliffe Camera Act 1720 (7 Geo. 1. St. 1. c. 13), was an act of the Parliament of the United Kingdom that enabled any corporations within the university to sell ground for building a library. The negotiations dealing with Catte Street took over twenty years, with the final payments being made to Oriel, Magdalen and University colleges in 1737 (N.S.).

Radcliffe had placed four men in charge of his estate: William Bromley, sometime Speaker of the House of Commons; Sir George Beaumont, a Lord of the Admiralty; Antony Keck, a banker; and Thomas Sclater Bacon, a lawyer. There appears to have been some difficulty in getting the required majority to agree to work beginning before 1736, with the four split between Bromley and Beaumont wanting to start and Bacon and Keck set against them. Accordingly, Bromley made plans for work to start not long after 1720, but they were never fulfilled. The early start was to be funded by the high share price of investments in the South Sea Company, which proved overly optimistic.

It was therefore in 1720 that the choice of architect was first considered – Christopher Wren, John Vanbrugh, Thomas Archer, James Thornhill, John James, Nicholas Hawksmoor, and James Gibbs were all considered. By the time the Trustees began to consider the building project, however, their options had reduced: Wren had died in 1723, Vanbrugh in 1724, and Thornhill in 1734. In 1734, Hawksmoor and Gibbs were invited to submit plans. A model, believed to be to Hawksmoor's specification, was made in 1734 and presented to the university in 1913. The model was well-received and it appears to have only been Hawksmoor's death in 1736 that led the Trustees to appoint Gibbs as architect to the project. Gibbs was given a salary of £100 per annum "for directing and supervising the building of the Radcliffe Library and drawing all plans that shall be necessary for completing that work and corresponding with the builders, and going down four times in every year to see the building".

On 4 March 1737, the Trustees directed Gibbs along with Francis Smith of Warwick and William Townesend of Oxford 'to prepare Stones and things ready for building the library'. An early set of plans were engraved and prints delivered to the most important members of the town and university, no doubt to ensure that their opposition was dealt with swiftly. The university in particular seems to have influenced the Trustees' plan, although the Library would not form part of it. A second set were made a year later. A third set of prints, representing the final plans, were reprinted by Gibbs in his Bibliotheca Radcliviana of 1747.

=== Construction ===
On 17 May 1737, the foundation stone was laid. Four days before, the Trustees had decided on an inscription for it to bear on a copper plate. The whereabouts of neither the stone nor the plate are known, although it is believed that the copper plate adorned a section of the wall that was removed to create the doorway in 1863. That inscription read:

Quod Felix Faustumque sit

Academiae Oxoniensi Die XVI. Kalendarum Junii Anno MDCCXXXVII
Carolo Comite de Arran Cancellario Staphano Niblett S.T.P. Vice-Cancellario Thoma Paget et Iohanne Land A.M. Procuratoribus
Plaudenti undique Togata Gente Honorabilis Admodum D^{nus} D^{nus} Carolus Noel Somerset Honorabilis Iohannes Verney Gualterus Wagstaff Bagot Baronettus Edwardus Harley et Armigeri Edwardus Smith
Radclivii Munificentissimi Testamenti Curatores P.P. Jacobo Gibbs Architecto

The progress of the building and the craftsmen employed is detailed both in the Minute Books of the Trustees and the Building Book, which supplement information given by Gibbs in his Bibliotheca Radcliviana. An extract states:

Mr. William Townesend of Oxford, and Mr. William Smith of Warwick, were employed to be masons; Mr. John Philipps to be the carpenter and joiner; Mr. George Devall to be plumber; Mr. Townsend junior to be stone carver; Mr. Linel of Long-acre, London, to be carver in wood; Mr. Artari, an Italian, to be their plaisterer in the fret work way; Mr. Michael Rysbrack to be sculptor, to cut the Doctor's figure in marble; and Mr. Blockley to be locksmith.

Francis Smith, the father of William, was chosen as one of the masons, but died in 1738 and was succeeded by his son near the beginning of building. In 1739, John Townesend also succeeded his father on the latter's death. The Clerk of Works for most of the construction was Thomas Jersey, who was paid £40 per annum. He was replaced in 1745 by George Shakespeare and shortly thereafter William Robinson. The construction went smoothly until February 1741, save for a short interruption in the latter part of 1740 when the threat of smallpox halted work. It was in February 1741 that there appears to have been either a misunderstanding or a change of plan concerning what the dome was to be constructed out of. It had been partially completed out of stone, to the value of over £700 of stonework completed or prepared, when all work was immediately halted. The Trustees threatened to take the matter to the Court of Chancery if Townesend and Smith pursued their claim for £700 to cover the stonemasons' bills; the Trustees did not make good this threat and they eventually paid the bill. Part of the stone dome was removed and the dome recovered in timber and lead. 41 tonnes of Derbyshire lead was used on the roof. The incident took over a year to completely resolve. The dome had been completed by March 1743. In 1742 or 1743, when the exterior scaffolding was being removed (only work on the cupola and balustrade remained) two men were killed in an accident. The Trustees approved the payment of £20 to be held on trust for the family of one of the dead men and inquired after the circumstances of the accident and the men injured.

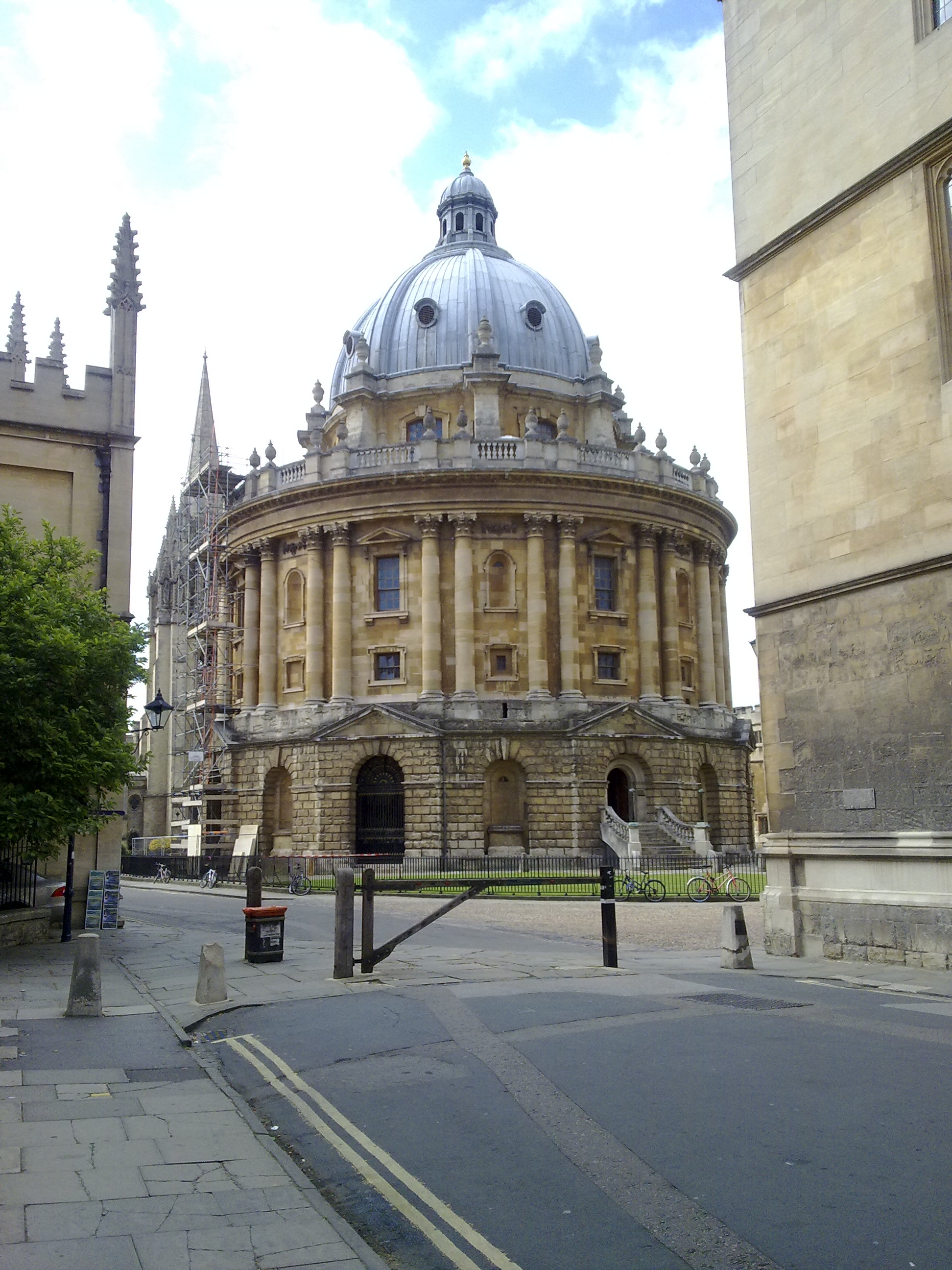
The Camera, as viewed from outside the Bodleian Library on Catte Street, with St Mary's obscured behind left.

The interior work began once the main structure was complete. John Phillips was employed as a carpenter for the Library's floors, windows and bookcases. Joseph Artari was chosen to be the project's plasterer, employing Charles Stanley and Thomas Toberts alongside him. In March 1745, the Trustees intervened to help ensure no work was proceeding by candlelight as the Library neared completion. A portrait of Radcliffe was sent to John Michael Rysbrack, who was tasked with creating a six-feet tall marble statue of the Library's benefactor. It was installed by Townesend and Smith. The responsibility for the ironwork for the gates for the seven exterior arches of the library was given to Robert Bakewell of Derby. His original estimate proved too low, however, explained by Gibbs to be a result of the French war. It eventually cost £364. The Trustee's meeting of 13 March 1746 reveals that the remaining work consisted of the paving of the library inside and out, the staircase rail, and the locks, hinges and bolts for the bookcases.

The exterior of the building was complete by 1747 and the building fully completed in 1748. A librarian was appointed, as was a porter. Before Radcliffe's death, the sub-librarian of the Bodleian, Thomas Hearne, was widely considered to have been Radcliffe's choice as his new librarian. He was not appointed, however, and the post remained unfilled. In 1737, another sub-librarian, Francis Wise, reached out to several influential figures (including the Duke of Newcastle) to assist him in securing the position. However, by 1741 he had grown deeply weary of the level of competition he faced, particularly from a Richard Green, Radcliffe's great-nephew. The position did not go to Green, however: Wise was appointed to the position by a majority of one in 1748. The first porter was Pudsey Mussendine, who was paid a salary of £20 per annum, and received a gown in Radcliffe's colours and with his coat of arms emblazoned on it. The opening ceremony was delayed by around a year because of disturbances in Oxford. It finally took place on 13 April 1749.

Work on the exterior continued after the opening of the Library. In 1750, part of the land between the Camera and St. Mary's Church was remodelled to remove a dividing wall, level the ground and lay pebbles on it. This cost a total of £158. 17s, of which £100 came from the Trust and the rest from the university. The Old Convocation house was repaired in 1759 at the cost of £144. In 1751, the Trustees also agreed to the construction of twenty obelisks to hold gas lamps, which the university agreed to maintain. Only 14 were actually erected and in 1755 the Trustees reimbursed the university for the cost of maintaining them up to that point and took on the obligation itself out of the £100 per annum left by Radcliffe for the Library's upkeep. In 1758–9, for example, they were lit on 89 nights at a cost of £23. 6s. 1d.

=== History as an independent library ===
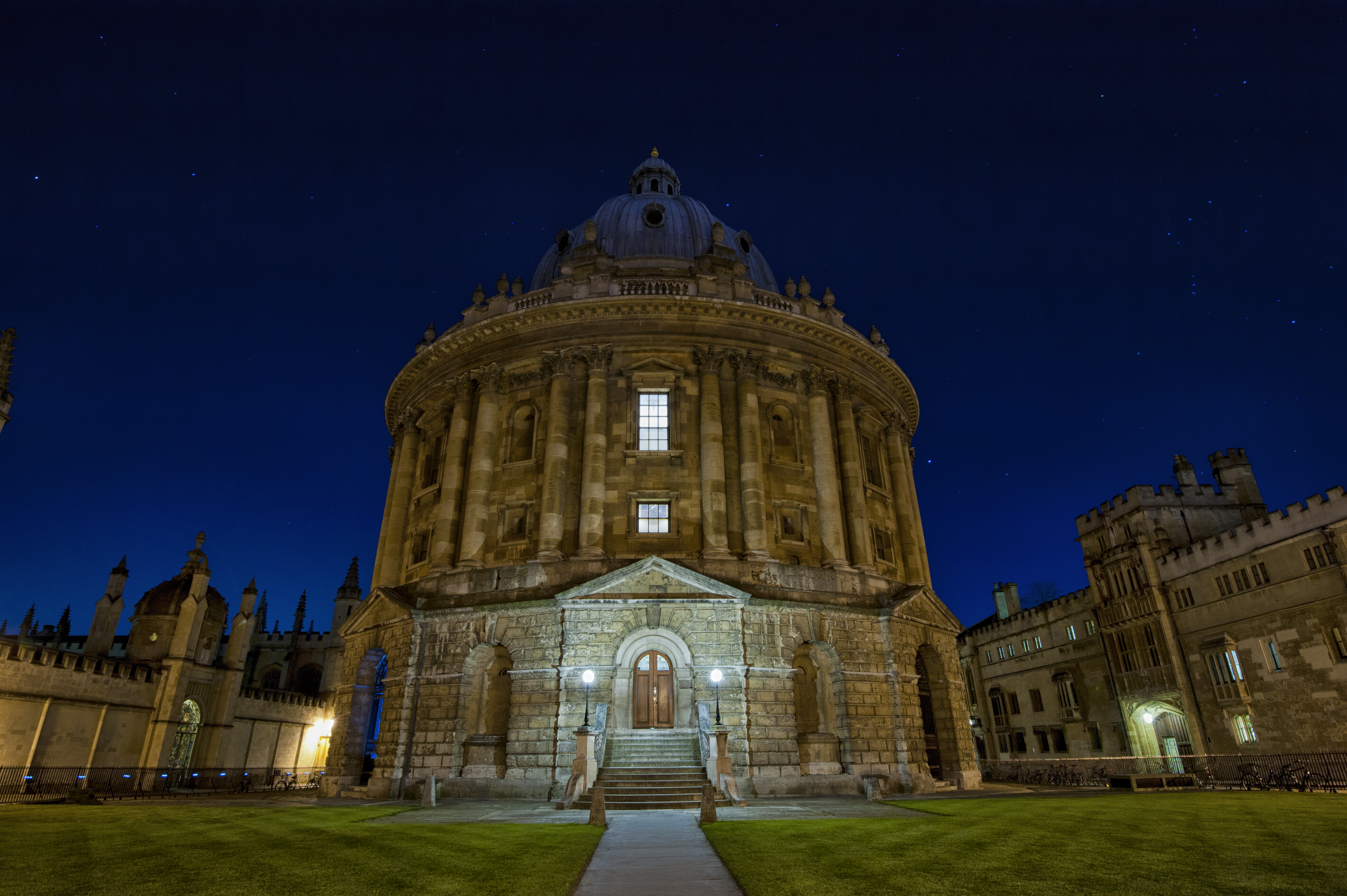
Night view

The library's collection grew only slowly. The first book to be placed in the library was identified by one contemporary account as Thomas Carte's A General History of England. The first donation was some 50,000 pamphlets from a Mr Bartholomew of University College, subsequently gifted to the Bodleian in 1794. The first major purchase was books to the value of £45 from a seller in Newport in 1751, although they were kept in private possession until 1755. In 1754, the library received a number of books from the estate of James Gibbs, mostly concerning architecture. A number of classical and history books by the bequest of Richard Frewin, Camden Professor of Ancient History, and law books of Charles Viner, the founder of the Vinerian Professorship of Common Law, were also added to the library. Early purchases also included the purchase of the manuscripts of James Fraser to the value of £500, and those of George Sale for £157 10s., both concerned with the Middle East – the first on the advice of Thomas Hunt, Laudian Professor of Arabic. The texts appear to have suffered from poor care after their acquisition. Three further collections were purchased before Wise's death in 1767. Even at this early stage, the Trustees appear to have collaborated with the Bodleian to avoid duplication. The Library quickly became known as 'the Physic Library'. Despite its name, its acquisitions were varied for the first sixty years, but from 1811 its intake was confined to works of a scientific nature. During the first half of the 19th century the collections included coins, marbles, candelabra, busts, plaster casts, and statues. These collections have since been moved to more specifically appropriate sites.

A muniment room was created in 1753 to house the collection documents relating to Radcliffe's will and the accumulated deeds of the land on which the library had been built. Despite regular inspections, in 1817, a number of deeds were found to have degraded completely. Although the Trustees did not believe that the particular documents lost were likely to cause many future problems, the remaining manuscripts were moved to the main Library to prevent further damage. In other respects, Wise's tenure was marked only by his poor (and worsening) health and poor relations with the university. University members expected to be admitted and the vice-chancellor made it clear to Wise that he believed the library part of the university and thus under his overall control. Wise did not agree, threatening at one point to padlock the library and refer any man who cut it to the courts. The vice-chancellor took this as an unprovoked insult and turned to consideration of the university statutes and the imposition, if they did not already exist, of such statutes as would compel the ageing Wise to attend to his duties from which he was now regularly absent. Five years before his actual death in 1767, a satirical death notice was placed in the London papers announcing the "greatly regretted" death of Wise "[his death] occasioned by a violent cold, contracted by too close attendance on the duties of his respective offices". In those last years, Wise was so ill that he could no longer attend the library. Upon his death, his collection of coins was presented to the library.

He was replaced by Benjamin Kennicott who served as librarian until his death in 1783. His librarianship saw the purchase of more Arabic, Hebrew and Persian works, the subject of study of Kennicott. Despite several reparative measures, the building continued to fall into disrepair, with Kennicott immersed in his academic study. Comments at the time of his death noted that the collection was "so far from being 'one of the first collections in the Universe,' that it is even inconsiderable and invaluable when compared, not only with the Bodley collection, but perhaps others in Oxford." Kennicott's successor, Thomas Hornsby, did nothing to improve the situation, devoting much of time to his other post of Radcliffe Observer. There are no records of any books being bought before his death in 1810. There was, however, one controversial benefaction of a series of marbles, with a custodian appointed and funded (along with the cost of securing the statues) by Sir Roger Newdigate. It was eventually accepted, although not without opposition from Hornsby who believed it would distract from the library's academic purpose and block readers' light. Upon Newdigate's death, the statues had not been purchased and his executors added to the opposition. The benefaction was reassessed and finally rejected. In the last years of his tenure, Hornsby was asked to provide a catalogue, but no such document was put together before his death.

Hornsby's successor was chosen as George Williams. It was under his tenure that "a new era dawned" for the Radcliffe Library. Williams, a physician in the Radcliffe Infirmary and Professor of Botany, adopted an approach which had been mooted a couple of years before to fill the library's shelves not with a general collection of works, but rather specifically scientific books. Huge sums were spent from funds which had accumulated from previous years: £2000 in 1814, and around £500 annually for the years after. Dr. Abraham Robertson was asked to donate a copy of the Radcliffe Observatory's records each year in exchange for being allowed to borrow certain books. In 1814, the library hosted a banquet for the visiting Prince Regent. The Library also received a number of marble busts and a collection of 1,000 marble specimens. The grounds of the library were enclosed by railings in 1827 at a cost of £1,310, although the ascertainment of the exact extent of the Trustee's holdings required careful examination and a previous overlooked transfer completed. Upon Williams' death in 1834, the Trustees gave an unprecedented statement of thanks; it was echoed by a report in The Gentleman's Magazine which read: "In carrying into effect these great national as well as academic purposes, the Trustees found in Dr. Williams's extensive reading, retentive memory... exact judgment, comprehensive views and philosophical mind, the very talents and accomplishments which were necessary to ensure the successful execution of their design".

Williams was succeeded by John Kidd, Regius Professor of Medicine. Gas heating and lighting was introduced into the library, a third member of staff (an assistant) hired at a salary of £25 per annum, and insurance taken out against the risk of fire – £10,000 to cover the buildings and a further £10,000 for the books. In 1835, the library catalogue was finally published, for which Kidd received £100 by way of bonus. He was, however, unsuccessful in three attempts to secure a pay rise. The book collection continued to expand, with Kidd required to provide a memorandum of books added each year to the library, and the first proper bookcases installed. A visitors' book was created to distinguish students and academics from "those who visit the Library from mere motives of general curiosity". In other respects Library life was unremarkable for the rest of Kidd's tenure, which ended with his death in 1851.

Henry Wentworth Acland succeeded Kidd as Librarian. He made several structural alterations, creating a reading room, improving the lighting and heating and adding a hot water system. More significantly, in light of the sum of £200 to be spent on books annually, which Acland considered insufficient, he set out a detailed proposal to bring the library under the leadership of the university. In 1856, he laid out his plan to the Trustees, at which point the library contained between 14,000 and 15,000 volumes: "[I fear] the Library be found wanting in some standard work of reference [or] the ordinary Scientific Literature... [while] it is supposed by visitors... that the great collection of scientific works in Oxford is to be found in the Radcliffe Library... the Bodleian Library is far richer in scientific transactions and periodicals; it receives, or ought to receive, without cost all British books... the Radcliffe Library must be accounted to be, and will remain, of much less public utility than is generally supposed." The Radcliffe Library building was to become a reading room of the Bodleian, and the collection transferred to the new 'Museum Library' being constructed (now the Radcliffe Science Library). The plan was accepted by both parties and on 23 October 1861 the keys to the Radcliffe Library building were handed to Bodley's Librarian. It took four more years to finalise everything. The Radcliffe Library building thus became the Radcliffe Camera as the library ceased to be fully independent. The Trustees retained the freehold to the building, which was finally transferred to the university in 1927.

=== Later history as part of the university ===
Between 1909 and 1912, an underground book store of two floors was constructed beneath the north lawn of the library with a tunnel connecting it with the Bodleian, invisibly linking the two library buildings, something envisaged by Henry Acland in 1861. It was known as the "Radder" in 1930s slang but was later referred to as "the Radcliffe Link" or "the Link". This was refurbished as reading rooms, completed in 2011, and is now known as the "Gladstone Link", or colloquially as the "Glink".

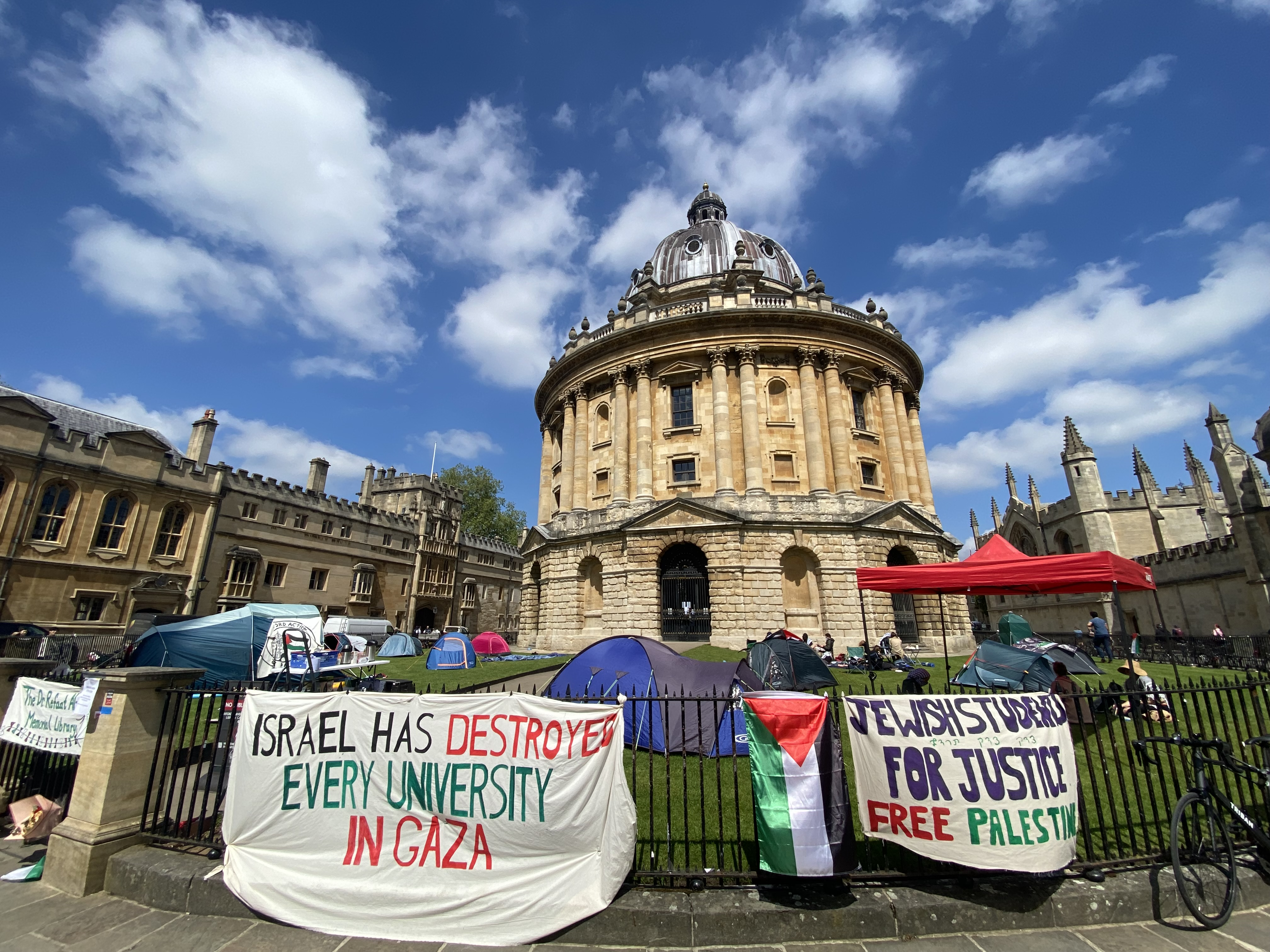
A Palestinian solidarity encampment on the lawn of the Radcliffe Camera, 2024

After the library as such moved out, the Radcliffe Camera came into use as additional reading rooms of the Bodleian Library. The interior of the upper reading room houses a six-foot marble statue of John Radcliffe, carved by John Michael Rysbrack. The building now holds books from the English, history, and theology collections, mostly secondary sources on undergraduate and graduate reading lists. There is space for around 600,000 books in rooms beneath Radcliffe Square.

The Radcliffe Camera has been the site of several student-led protests. In November 2010, the building was occupied by students for over twenty-four hours, as part of wider national protest against proposed changes to university funding and substantial increases in the cost of tuition. In October 2023, the building was sprayed with orange paint in a protest by Just Stop Oil against Oxford University's links to fossil fuel companies such as Ineos. In May 2024, pro-Palestinian activists set up a tent encampment of the grounds of the Radcliffe Camera as part of the 2024 University of Oxford pro-Palestinian campus occupations demanding that Oxford University divest from Israel.

== Architecture ==
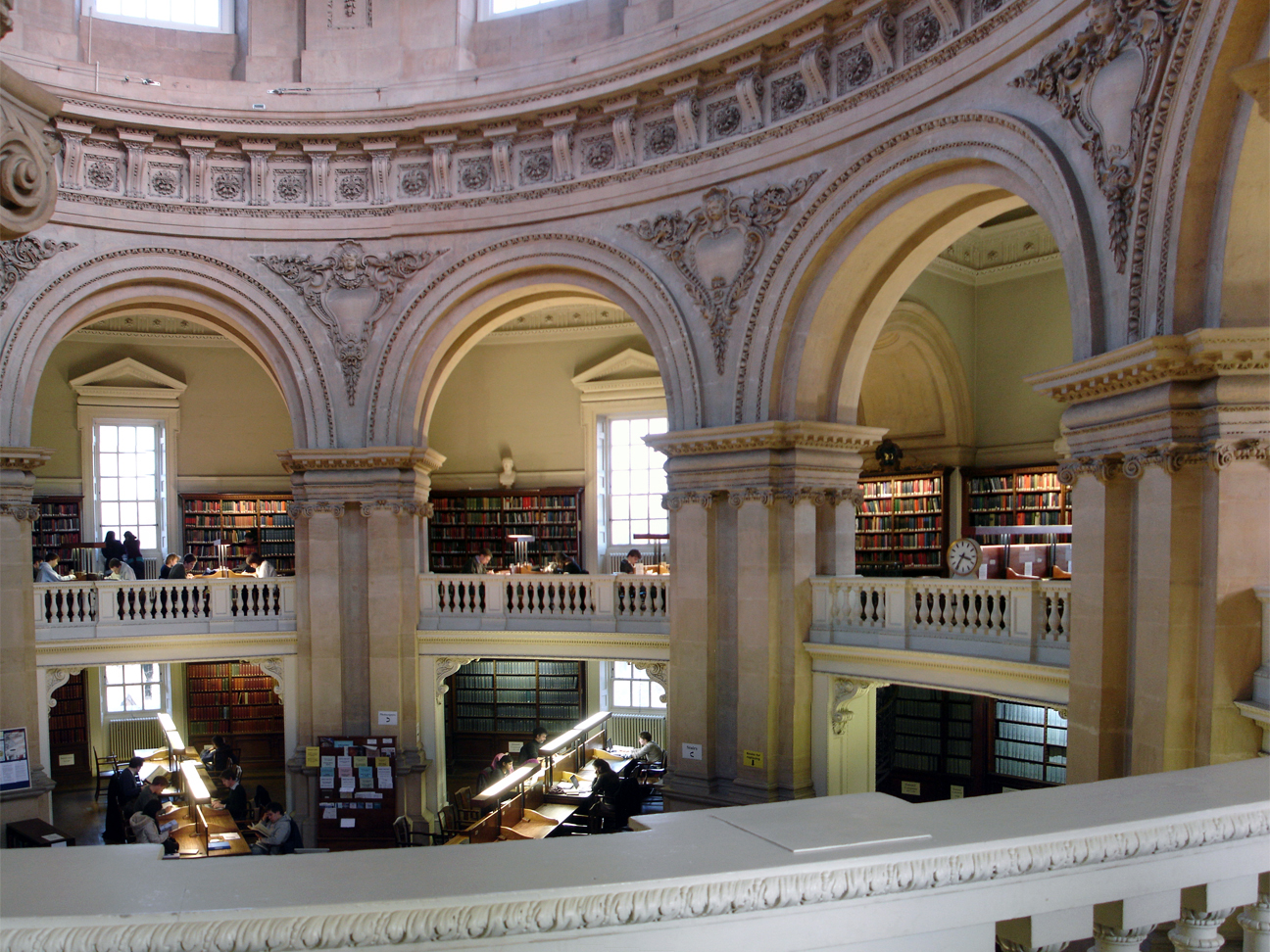
Inside Upper Camera

The building is the earliest example in England of a circular library. It is built in three main stages externally and two stories internally, the upper one containing a gallery. The ground stage is heavily rusticated and has a series of eight pedimented projections alternating with niches. The central stage is divided into bays by coupled Corinthian columns supporting the continuous entablature. The pedimented windows stand above mezzanine openings, reflecting the interior arrangement. The top stage is a lanterned dome on an octagonal drum, with a balustraded parapet with vases.

The construction used local stone from Headington and Burford, which was then ashlar faced. The dome and cupola are covered with lead. Inside, the original walls and dome were distempered but this was later removed, revealing the decorations to be carved in stone. Only the decorative work of the dome is plaster.

Originally, the basement was an open arched arcade with a vaulted stone ceiling, with Radcliffe's coat of arms in the centre. The arcade arches were fitted with iron grilles: three of them were gates which were closed at night, and which gave access to the library by a grand staircase. In 1863, when the building had become a reading-room of the Bodleian, the arches were glazed, a new entrance was created on the north side in place of a circular window, with stone steps leading up to the entrance.

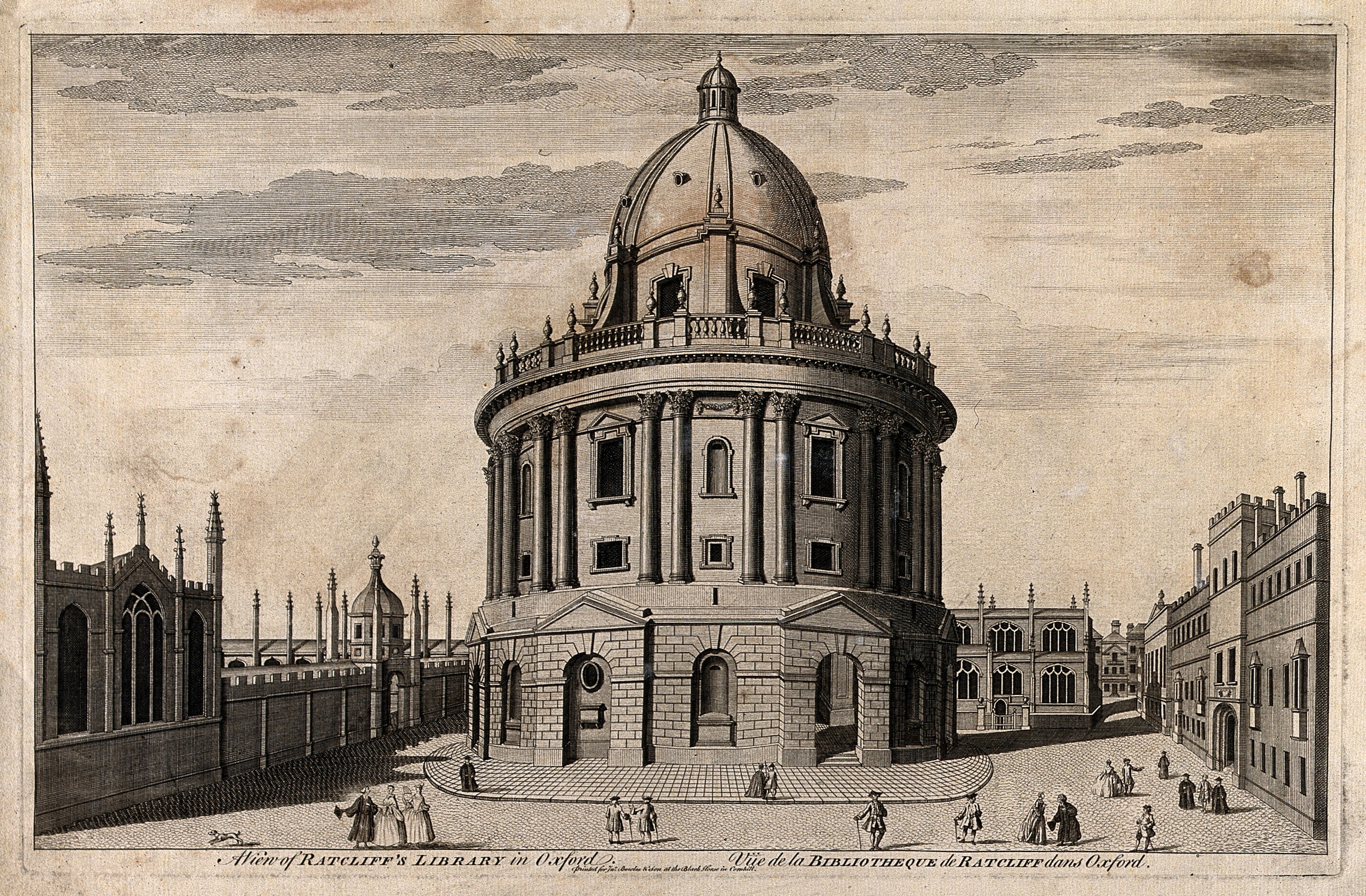
Radcliffe Camera (line engraving)

The area around the Library was originally partly paved, partly cobbled, and partly gravelled. In 1751 stone posts and obelisks surmounted by lamps were placed around the perimeter. All but the three at the entrance to Brasenose Lane were removed around 1827 when the lawns were laid and iron railings installed.

== Reception ==
The 1744 work The Present State of the Universities by Thomas Salmon described the new Radcliffe library as "the most magnificent Structure in Oxford... I find a great many People of Opinion that he intended to perpetuate his Memory by it, and therefore give it the name of 'Radcliffe's Mausoleum'". This was echoed by The Gentleman and the Lady's Pocket Companion for Oxford (1747) which said that "the most magnificent structure in Oxford is the new public Library". In 1773, however, Edward Tatham was not so complimentary: "The writer... cannot help expressing his disapprobation of the situation of the Radclivian Library. Whatever merit this edifice reflects on the architect, and splendor on the University, it certainly destroys the regularity of the area, and intercepts the view of every building in it." He regarded the north side of Broad Street, south of the gardens of Trinity College, to have been a more suitable site and the chosen site left largely open "as we pronounce in general that the areas in a town should be free, open, and without obstruction".

Gibbs later said of the Trustees: "I never observed a trust discharged with greater unanimity, integrity and candor, during the whole time I had the honour of serving you, from the laying of the first stone of this fabric to its finishing." Contemporaries found great irony in the fact that the iconoclast Radcliffe, who scorned book-learning, should bequeath a substantial sum for the founding of the Radcliffe Library. Sir Samuel Garth quipped that the endowment was "about as logical as if a eunuch should found a seraglio".

== See also ==
- Radcliffe Infirmary
- Radcliffe Observatory
- Radcliffe Science Library
- Radcliffe Quadrangle

== Bibliography ==
- Salter, H. E.; Lobel, Mary D., eds. (1954). "The Radcliffe Camera". A History of the County of Oxford: The University of Oxford. Vol. 3. London: Victoria County History.
- Gillam, S. G. (1958). The Building Accounts of the Radcliffe Camera. Clarendon Press for the Oxford Historical Society. OCLC 470603538.
