= John Crosse (priest) =

English cleric

John Crosse (1739–1816) was an English cleric of evangelical views, vicar of Bradford, Yorkshire from 1784.

== Early life ==
He was the youngest of three surviving sons of Hammond Crosse (1703–1785) of Islington. His background was the Crosse family of Bedfordshire and Clerkenwell, who were involved in brewing. His father was the son of Andrew Crosse (1677–1749), who was master of the Brewers' Company in 1729; and was High Sheriff of Bedfordshire in 1745. He married Elizabeth Crosse, a cousin, daughter of Robert Crosse, and was a brewer at Millbank.

John Crosse was born in the parish of St. Martin-in-the-Fields, London, in 1739, and educated in a school at Hadley in Hertfordshire. As a teenager, he attended services given by William Dodd.

While living in London, Crosse joined a Methodist class. On the account of Joseph Sutcliffe (1762–1856), published by William Stamp, Crosse walked from Islington and heard Alexander Coates preach in east London, at age 19, and through Methodist connections met John Wesley.

== 1760s ==
Crosse matriculated at St Edmund Hall, Oxford in 1762. He was ordained deacon in 1763 by Robert Hay Drummond, with an Edinburgh M.A., and became a curate at Full Sutton in the East Riding of Yorkshire. He moved to the Lock Chapel, London, where he was chaplain. There he encountered William Dodd again, and came under the influence of Martin Madan.

In 1765 Crosse went abroad, and travelled for three years in Europe. He had as companion John Thornton, a cousin of John Thornton of Clapham, to whom he was acting as tutor. John Thornton of Clapham had experienced an evangelical conversion around 1754, in which Madan and Henry Venn were involved. On the way they paid a visit to Voltaire at Ferney, and went to the University of Halle. A manuscript account of Crosse's travels is extant. He graduated B.A. at Oxford in 1768.

== Later life ==
Crosse was made chaplain of Todmorden chapel, in the parish of Rochdale, in 1770. In 1775 he was made perpetual curate of two livings, the Whitechapel Church, Cleckheaton, and Cross Stone chapel in Halifax. At this period of his life he met Mary Bosanquet, who was resident at Cross Hall, near Morley, which is not far from Cleckheaton.

In 1776 Crosse was incorporated B.A. at Cambridge, and took the degree of M.A. as a member of King's College. He was presented to the vicarage of Bradford in 1784, by his father. The will of Hammond Crosse "of Islington" (died 1785), refers to this presentation to "Rev. John Crosse". He had purchased the Bradford advowson, from Francis Dawson of Newmarket.

Crosse was well-regarded as an evangelical clergyman by his parishioners during an incumbency of 32 years. He began by improving the organ and singing at his parish church, which expanded his congregation by attracting parishioners from nonconformist chapels. He added galleries to the church, and sought ways to build new ones. He maintained on good terms with his Wesleyan Methodist contacts, particularly John Wesley and John William Fletcher (died 1785). His continuing relationship with the widowed Mary Bosanquet Fletcher, who lived at Madeley, Shropshire, brought into his orbit, in the last years of his life, Patrick Brontë, William Morgan and John Fennell, all of whom joined him in the Bradford parish.

In later life Crosse was blind, but he continued to perform the offices of the church till a fortnight before his death, which took place on 17 June 1816. His successor was Henry Heap, for whom Crosse had found a curacy with Cornelius Bayley at St. James's Church, Manchester. The presentation depended on the advowson changing hands, via Henry Thornton of Clapham, to Charles Simeon.

An account of Crosse's pastoral work is given in The Parish Priest: pourtrayed in the Life, Character, and Ministry of the Rev. John Crosse (1841), by William Morgan incumbent of Christ Church, Bradford. His portrait was engraved by Francis William Topham from a painting by J. Hunter.

== Legacy ==
In his will Crosse made a bequest to George Buxton Browne, in trust, "for promoting the cause of true religion". In 1832 three Crosse scholarships in theology were founded in the University of Cambridge, based on the money he left.

== Works ==
Crosse was the author of:

- A Letter to the Author of Remarks on Two of the Most Singular Characters of the Age, London, 1790. This was in answer to an attack made on him by "Trim" (Edward Baldwyn), and was printed with a reply by the latter.
- A Reply to the Objections brought against the Church of England, in a late publication entitled "An Answer to the Inquiry, Why are you a Dissenter?", Bradford, 1798. This was a reply to the late Micaiah Towgood, criticising his interpretation of Article XX of the Thirty-Nine Articles as relying on selective reading.

== Family ==
Crosse married, firstly, in 1774, Grace Sutcliffe (died 1811). She was a widow, having been married first to Samuel Sutcliffe, and then to John Grimshaw, the son of William Grimshaw of Haworth. After her death, he married in 1812 Martha Hopkinson, and survived her.
