= Richard Conyers =

English cleric (1725–1786)

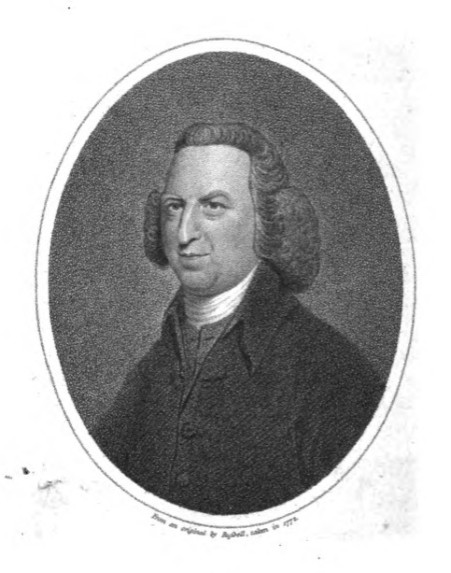
Richard Conyers

Richard Conyers (1725–1786) was an English evangelical cleric, and the hymn-book compiler of a precursor to the Olney Hymns. He became well known as the parish priest of Helmsley in the North Yorkshire Moors, a cure of scattered villages.

== Early life ==
Born in Lastingham, Yorkshire, he was the son of John Conyers (died 1733) and his wife Ann Boulby (died 1740), and was brought up by a grandmother; Wilson considers it likely this was his paternal grandmother Elizabeth Conyers, who died c.1748, widow of Robert Conyers who died 1734. Family property in Helmsley passed from Elizabeth to John (1723–1761), elder brother of Richard, and then to Richard.

Educated at Coxwold grammar school, Conyers matriculated at Jesus College, Cambridge in 1742, graduating B.A. in 1746 and M.A. in 1749. He became LL.D. in 1767. A tradition states that he was Senior Wrangler in the Cambridge Tripos; the year 1745 of his graduation precedes the period when this title was given in public. In any case he was placed above his friend Henry Venn, to the latter's chagrin. On leaving university, he lived in Helmsley with his grandmother Elizabeth Conyers.

== Parish priest in North Yorkshire ==
In 1747 Conyers was ordained deacon, by Samuel Peploe, with a promise from the Duncombe family of the succession to a living; it followed an unsuccessful attempt to be ordained to Kirby Wiske the previous year. Resident in Helmsley, he assisted at the church there. Conyers was ordained priest by Matthew Hutton in 1755, and was licensed to Kirby Overcarr, also known as Kirby Misperton, as curate.

=== Early years at Helmsley ===
The parish of Helmsley, noted in the 19th century as one of the largest in England, was 16 miles from north to south. It including Bilsdale to the north, and Harome somewhat to the east of the town of Helmsley; also Laskill, Pockley, Rievaulx and Sproxton. Initially Conyers also held the living of Kirkdale, a valley to the east beyond Kirby Misperton, but asked to be relieved of it in 1763.

The Vale of Pickering, to the south of Helmsley, was noted for its linen weavers. Linen and linsey-woolsey manufacture was a predominant local occupation, with flax brought by pack horse from Kingston upon Hull, during the 18th century. Linen yarn at the time was spun at Helmsley, by hand; spinning was mechanised by the early 19th century.

Conyers became rector of Church of All Saints, Helmsley in 1756, following the death of the Rev. Francis Hodgson in 1755, and also rector of Kirby Misperton in 1763, presented by Thomas Duncombe II. Curate to Conyers at Helmsley from about 1756, a local man who had attended Jesus College, Cambridge, was Roger Bentley. He was ordained priest in 1760. In 1759 he became brother-in-law to Conyers, marrying his younger sister Ellen.

To begin with, Conyers was concerned with education (he taught mathematics himself), and with the catechism. A grammar school founded by the mid-17th century had been supported by the Duncombe family; but Hodgson by 1743 reported to his archbishop that there was no endowment or other finance for a school.

=== Evangelical preacher ===
It was in 1758 that Conyers experienced an evangelical conversion. Two changes considered significant in the narrative of this conversion are his turning away from an anti-Trinitarian author, and his adoption of extempore preaching, rather than speaking from a text. In that year he joined the SPCK. For a short period, from 1761, he served as a naval chaplain; and was domestic chaplain to Richard Terrick from 1763 to 1770.

Conyers held daily morning services at Helmsley; and meetings on week nights at Beadlam. Kirby Misperton, though having a fair population, had a single Sunday service. Conyers had a resident curate there, who also served as rector of Normanby. Running a monthly communion service at Helmsley, at which a collection was taken, with a regular reported (i.e. quarterly) attendance of 450, Conyers was able to finance school places for 40 children.

Robert Hay Drummond, his archbishop, made clear his dislike of Conyers's preaching in 1764, an opinion formed after hearing a visitation sermon at Malton, saying "Were you to inculcate the morality of Socrates, it would do more good than canting about the new birth". But Conyers was favoured by William Legge, 2nd Earl of Dartmouth. The Duncombe family restored the chapel at Sproxton, just south of Helmsley, in 1765.

From 1766 Conyers extended the building in Bondgate, Helmsley, which remained the vicarage to 1940. In 1767 he was an itinerant preacher in Yorkshire, for Selina, Countess of Huntingdon, and in 1768 with George Whitefield. He was not, unlike Whitefield, a preacher in open-air meetings, but is thought to have infringed somewhat on demarcations, for example at Bilsdale. Having had a private chapel built next to the vicarage, Conyers carried out study and worship there, in a fashion that has been compared to John Berridge and William Bromley Cadogan. Another comparison is to William Grimshaw at Haworth.

From a Wesleyan point of view, Conyers was a revivalist, who before conversion was tending to Socinianism, but then leaned in the Calvinist direction; he prepared the ground locally for a Methodist chapel. George Cussons, the cabinet-maker and diarist from Ampleforth, was a Methodist from 1760, and a close friend. A few years after Conyers had moved on from Helmsley, the area was one of those petitioning against the Papists Act 1778. His successor as parish priest was John Clement, vicar of Helmsley 1776 to 1805.

== Associations ==
There was at this time an identifiable group of Yorkshire evangelicals, who included also Miles Atkinson and Henry Venn. Conyers belonged also to a circle around The Gospel Magazine, including John Berridge, Thomas Haweis, Martin Madan, and John Newton.

Newton and William Cowper were introduced by Conyers. In 1767 Conyers was staying in Olney, and asked Newton to call on Cowper and his friend Mary Unwin, whose husband had just died, in Huntingdon. Cowper wrote of Conyers, in his poem Truth:

[...] he says much that many may dispute,
And cavil at with ease, but none refute.

Conyers wrote to John Wesley shortly after his 1758 conversion. Wesley accepted an invitation to visit Conyers, coming on 17 April 1764 after discussion with Selina, Countess of Huntingdon. A couplet, from a poem sent by Augustus Toplady to Erasmus Middleton in 1775, imagines Wesley reciting a list of his Calvinist rivals:

"There's Townsend, Shirley, Foster, Venn,
With Madan, Conyers and Romaine..."

William Romaine was in Helmsley in 1766. John Thornton, patron of evangelicals and to become a relation by marriage, visited Conyers in 1764. Thornton then brought Roger Bentley, curate at Hemsley, to St Giles' Church, Camberwell in 1769. It followed Bentley's failed attempt two years earlier to obtain the living of Cottingham, blocked by Edmund Keene who suspected Bentley of Methodism.

== In Deptford ==
In 1775, Conyers was brought to St Paul's, Deptford, south of London, by John Thornton, his brother-in-law, on the death of James Bate. There Cornelius Bayley was a curate of his.

Conyers gained a reputation as a spiritual adviser, and converted outbuildings at Deptford to continue his pattern of religious study built up at his Helmsley chapel. He lectured four nights every week. He associated with evangelicals including George Pattrick, William Romaine and Henry Venn. Basil Woodd's 1784 memoir of his mother Hannah was in the form of a letter to Conyers.

Preaching, on the other hand, was by then problematic for Conyers, despite his reputation, for other clergy and the general public. He turned down an invitation from John Thomas, his bishop, to preach in another church. He did that just once, at St Mary the Virgin, Stone, Kent, by Dartford, for an archidiaconal visit, at personal cost. He was short of breath, and suffered from fainting.

Conyers died on 23 April 1786. His funeral sermon was preached on 7 May by John Newton, and he was buried in the parish churchyard of St Paul's, Deptford. An earlier sermon was preached by Thomas Scott, at the London Lock Hospital on 30 April. His successor was John Eaton (died 1806), rector of Fairstead, Essex.

== Works ==
The Operations of the Holy Ghost Considered, in a Sermon (1764) was the published form of the visitation sermon by Conyers, to which his archbishop took exception.

In 1767, Conyers published A Collection of Psalms and Hymns from Various Authors. At this period a number of evangelicals within the Church of England were compiling hymn books, and Conyers put his together to replace the use of metrical psalms and paraphrase singing by his own congregation.

The Collection took much of its material from Martin Madan's similar work of 1760. Additions included hymns by William Cowper and John Newton. Newton himself used the book for his "speaking on a hymn" in services. A 14th edition appeared in 1841. It proved influential, with Baptists in particular adopting hymns from the Collection, as well as from the Selection of John Rippon, to add to the repertoire handed down from Isaac Watts.

The hymn tune "Helmsley" is named for the Yorkshire parish, the title having been given by Madan in his Collection, 1769 edition. There has been confusion over the provenance of the tune.

== Family ==
In 1765 Conyers married Jane Thornton, a widow previously married in 1735 to the merchant Nathaniel Knipe, and the sister of John Thornton. She died in 1774, and they had no children. A monumental inscription to Jane Conyers was placed on the outside of Helmsley church.

== Biographers ==
The early biographers of Conyers included:

- James Illingworth, the last of Conyers's curates at Helmsley, who left a manuscript life of Conyers, dated c.1790.
- The author of the manuscript memoir of Conyers, edited by Quentin Harcourt Wilson, with the tentative attribution to Humphrey Sandwith II (1746–1809), grandfather of Humphry Sandwith IV (1822–1881). Internal evidence shows it to have been written in the period 1790–4.

The Memoir of Mr George Cussons, edited from the diary of Cussons for a period of over 50 years, contains letters from Conyers.
