= Thomas Knowlton (botanist) =

English gardener and botanist

Thomas Knowlton (1692–1782) was an English gardener and botanist, known also for antiquarian interests.

== Life ==
He was born at Chislehurst, Kent, the son of William Knowlton and his wife Ann Stokes. He worked in 1720 at Offaly Palace, Hertfordshire, for Sir Henry Penrice. He then superintended the botanic garden of James Sherard at Eltham, in Kent. In 1728 he entered the service of Richard Boyle, 3rd Earl of Burlington, at Londesborough Hall, Yorkshire, where he appears to have remained. He died in 1782 at the age of ninety.

== Botanist ==
Knowlton gained a reputation as a botanist. He corresponded with Mark Catesby, Emanuel Mendes da Costa, and other members of the Royal Society, and impressed Sir Hans Sloane.

At Wallingfen in the East Riding of Yorkshire, Knowlton discovered the algal "moor balls", known to Linnæus as Ægagropila. He prospected for them in lake water.

The genus Knowltonia of the order Ranunculaceae, of a number of species of plants indigenous to the Cape of Good Hope, was named after him. This was by Richard Anthony Salisbury, in 1796.

== Antiquarian ==
Knowlton claimed the location of the Roman site Delgovicia was near Pocklington, in Yorkshire. He used the Philosophical Transactions to communicate on this and other subjects.

== Family ==
Knowlton married in 1720 Elizabeth Rice (d. 1738). They had two children, Elizabeth and Charles. Charles graduated M.A. from St. John's College, Cambridge, in 1751, and was presented, on 7 April 1753, by the Earl of Burlington to the living of Keighley in Yorkshire.

The John Knowlton, gardener to Earl Fitzwilliam, with will proved in February 1782, has tentatively been identified as a brother. Thomas Knowlton is known to have had a brother of the name: Henrey considers that the John Knowlton, gardener to Sir Thomas Sebright, 4th Baronet of Beechwood Park, was that brother.
