= George Williams (physician) =

George Williams, FRCP (c. 1762 – 17 January 1834) was an English physician and librarian. He was a fellow of Corpus Christi College, Oxford, from 1781 until his death and he served at various times as the college bursar, vice-president and garden master. He was Sherardian Professor of Botany at the University of Oxford from 1796 to 1834 and Librarian of the Radcliffe Camera from 1810 to 1834.
