= Edward Baldwyn =

English clergyman and pamphleteer

Edward Baldwyn (born 1746 – died 1817) was an English clergyman and pamphleteer.

== Life ==
Baldwyn was educated at St John's College, Oxford (B.A., 1767; M.A., 1784). For some years, he was resident in Yorkshire, master of Bradford Grammar School from 1784. Under the pseudonym of "Trim", he engaged in a literary squabble with the Rev. William Atkinson and other clergymen including John Crosse, and Atkinson's brother Johnson Atkinson Busfeild.

Subsequently, Balwyn moved to Ludlow in Shropshire, and eventually became rector of Abdon in the county.

He died in Kentish Town, London, 11 February 1817, and was buried in Old St Pancras churchyard.

== Works ==
- A Critique on the Poetical Essays of the Rev. William Atkinson, 1787.
- Further Remarks on two of the most Singular Characters of the Age, 1789.
- A Letter to the Author of Remarks on two of the most Singular Characters of the Age. By the Rev. John Crosse, vicar of Bradford; with a reply by the former, 1790, with which is printed The Olla Podrida; or Trim's Entertainment for his Creditors.
- Remarks on the Oaths, Declarations, and Conduct of Johnson Atkinson Busfield, Esq., 1791.
- A Congratulatory Address to the Rev. John Crosse, on the Prospect of his Recovery from a Dangerous Disease, 1791.
