= William Atkinson (poet) =

English Anglican priest, academic, poet and pamphleteer

William Atkinson (1757–1846), was an English cleric, academic, poet and pamphleteer.

== Life ==
He was born at Thorp Arch, in the ainsty of the city of York, in 1757, the son of Christopher Atkinson, rector of Thorp Arch and sometime master of Macclesfield Grammar School, and his wife Jane Johnson; Miles Atkinson was an elder brother. He was admitted a sizar of Jesus College, Cambridge, 29 December 1775, graduating B.A. in 1780. He was elected a Fellow of his college, and proceeded to the degree of M.A. in 1783.

Having taken holy orders, Atkinson was appointed lecturer at the parish church of Bradford, in Yorkshire. Subsequently, in 1792, he was presented by the lord chancellor to the rectory of Warham All Saints, in Norfolk. He died at Thorpe Arch 30 September 1846.

== Works ==
Atkinson published a small volume of Poetical Essays, Leeds, 1786, which was sarcastically reviewed by "Trim" (Edward Baldwyn), in A Critique on the Poetical Essays of the Rev. William Atkinson, London, 1787. Baldwyn, headmaster of Bradford Grammar School, resented Atkinson's appointment as lecturer. "Trim" published a further pamphlet, descending to personal abuse, A Congratulatory Letter to the Rev. William Atkinson, M.A., Fellow of Jesus College, Cambridge, on his appearance in the character of a printer, with remarks on the several papers that have issued from his press, London, 1790, replying to some self-published pamphlets by Atkinson.

Becoming a controversialist, Atkinson engaged in polemics also with the nonconformist Edward Parsons (1762–1833), in 1801–2. He published 25 pamphlets, and a periodical "The Looking Glass"
