= Ten-year man =

A ten-year man was a category of mature student at the University of Cambridge.

Under the University's statutes of 1570, a man over age twenty-four could proceed to a Bachelor of Divinity (BD) degree ten years after matriculation without first gaining a Bachelor of Arts degree or a Master of Arts degree. The device was not used much until the second decade of the 19th century. It was abolished in the mid-19th-century university reforms, after criticism that it had become a route to a Cambridge degree which required no formal test of ability, ruling out enrolling as a ten-year man after 1858, although those enrolled by then remained members of the university, and ten-year men did not become extinct until 1900.

The ten-year route to a degree was significantly used by men who had already been ordained as clergy, and wanted to increase their status by taking a degree; likewise, it found use by laymen who aspired to be ordained but who were not (usually for financial reasons) able to take a degree in the regular way.

Although the ten-year BD was criticised for its lack of appropriate oversight and inadequate means of assessment, it should not be assumed that all those who enrolled for it were men of low academic abilities: most were merely from backgrounds too poor to allow them to go to university at the usual age. Scholars among them include Thomas Hartwell Horne, Cornelius Bayley, Joseph Bosworth, John Hellins and William Scoresby.
