= Basil Woodd =

English evangelical cleric

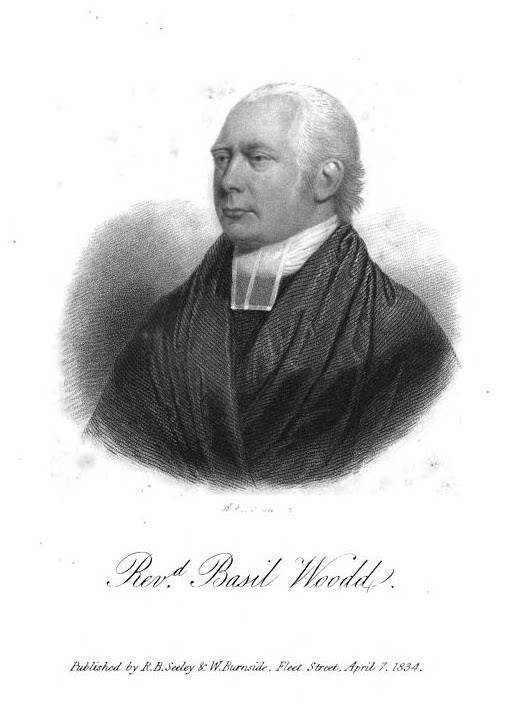
Basil Woodd

Basil Woodd (1760–1831) was an English evangelical cleric, known as a hymn-writer.

== Life ==
Born at Richmond, Surrey on 5 August 1760, he was the only son of Basil Woodd (1730–1760) and his wife Hannah (died 12 November 1784), daughter of William Price of Richmond. He was educated by Thomas Clarke, rector of Chesham Bois in Buckinghamshire, and matriculated at Trinity College, Oxford, on 7 May 1778, graduating B.A. in February 1782 and M.A. in 1785. On 16 March 1783 he was ordained deacon, and in 1784 priest. On 10 August 1784 he was chosen lecturer of St Peter's, Cornhill, a post which he retained until 1808.

In February 1785 Woodd was appointed morning preacher at Bentinck Chapel, Marylebone. Early on, he established evening preaching, an innovation which was at first resisted. Bentinck was a proprietary chapel, and he purchased the lease in 1793. On 5 April 1808 he was instituted rector of Drayton Beauchamp in Buckinghamshire.

Woodd was successful in establishing schools, some of them connected with Bentinck Chapel. He was a member of religious societies, including the Society for Promoting Christian Knowledge, the Church Missionary Society, and the British and Foreign Bible Society. He died at Paddington Green, near London, on 12 April 1831.

== Works ==
Woodd was a prolific author. His publications included:

- Memoirs of Mrs. Hannah Woodd, London, 1793; on his mother, and in the form of a letter to Richard Conyers. It was republished in 1815 in George Jerment's edition of Thomas Gibbons's Memoirs of Eminently Pious Women.
- The Duties of the Married State, London, 1807.
- A New Metrical Version of the Psalms of David, with an Appendice of Select Psalms and Hymns, London, 1821; 2nd edit. 1822. The earlier Psalms of David of 1794 was an innovative hymnal.

Of Woodd's hymns, Hail, Thou Source of every Blessing became well known.

== Family ==
Woodd was twice married: first, on 8 February 1785, to Ann (died 23 April 1791), daughter of Colonel Wood (died 1775); and, secondly, on 3 July 1792, to Sophia Sarah (died 15 August 1829), daughter of William Jupp of Wandsworth, an architect. By his first wife he had a son, Basil Owen (died 1811), and two daughters—Anne Louisa (died 1824), married to John Mortlock; and Anna Sophia (died 1817), married to Thomas Cahusac—and by his second wife two sons and a daughter.
