= George Charles Deering =

George Charles Deering, originally Georg Karl Dering (c.1695–1749) was a German botanist and medical practitioner, resident in Great Britain for the last 30 years of his life.

== Life ==
Deering was born in the Electorate of Saxony, educated at Hamburg and Leyden, and came to London in 1713 as secretary to Baron Schach, envoy to Queen Anne from Peter the Great. He remained in England as a tutor till November 1718, when he married and returned to the continent, where he took a degree at Reims, 13 December 1718. He went on to Paris, studying anatomy and botany under Bernard de Jussieu. In August 1719 he came back to England.

For a time Deering worked as a medical practitioner in London. He joined the botanical society set up by Johann Jakob Dillenius and John Martyn, which existed from 1721 to 1726.

In 1736, no longer married, Deering moved to Nottingham, with a letter of recommendation from Hans Sloane. At first Deering was successful in his practice, and issued a short tract on his method of treating the small-pox; but he may have been temperamentally unsuited to the work, He was made ensign on 29 October 1745, in the Nottingham infantry regiment, during the 1745 Jacobite Rebellion.

A sufferer from gout, in late life Deering succumbed to asthma, and declined. He died 12 April 1749, and was buried in St. Peter's churchyard, Nottingham, opposite the house he lived in. His name is commemorated by the genus Deeringia R.Br., still current in the family Amaranthaceae.

== Works ==
Two years after moving to Nottingham, Deering published a list of local plants. With some of the cryptogams he had been helped by Dillenius. They collaborated in other ways, acknowledged by Dillenius in the preface to his major work Historia Muscorum.

Materials collected by John Plumptre (died 1751) for a history of Nottingham were passed to Deering by friends. Edited by him for publication, they appeared posthumously as Nottinghamia Vetus et Nova (1751). It was printed by George Ayscough, and contained in particular a detailed description of the stocking frame.
