= Cornelius Bayley =

English Anglican cleric

Cornelius Bayley (1751–2 April 1812), was an English Anglican cleric.

== Biography ==
He was born in 1751 at Ashe, near Whitchurch, Shropshire. His father seems to have migrated to Manchester while Cornelius was young, and to have been a leather-maker there. He was educated at the Whitchurch Grammar School, Shropshire, of which for a short time he acted as master. He became a Methodist preacher, but later took orders in the Church of England. That was in 1781, and he went on to serve as curate to John William Fletcher at Madeley, and Richard Conyers at Deptford.

Bayley was the first incumbent of St. James' Church, Manchester, a "proprietary church", which he built in 1787. The degree of B.D., taken by the ten-year route, was conferred on him at Cambridge in 1792, and that of D.D. in 1800.

Bayley died on 2 April 1812 at Manchester.

== Publications ==
In 1782 Bayley published a Hebrew grammar, An Entrance into the Sacred Tongue. A second edition was issued after his death. He wrote notes and a preface to an edition of the Homilies of the church, published at Manchester in 1811. His other published writings were sermons and pamphlets, one being on the Swedenborgian Doctrine of the Trinity (1785).
