= James Sherard =

English apothecary, botanist and amateur musician

- Born: 1 November 1666; Bushby, Leicestershire, England
- Died: 1 November 1738 (aged 72)
- Education: Merchant Taylors' School, Northwood
- Scientific career
- Fields: Botany
- Workplaces: Chelsea Physic Garden

James Sherard (1 November 1666 – 12 February 1738) was an English apothecary, botanist, and amateur musician.

== Career ==
Sherard was born in Bushby, Leicestershire to George and Mary Sherwood; it is unknown why his surname was changed. His older brother William also became a noted botanist. James Sherard may have been educated at Merchant Taylors' School, Northwood, which his brother attended, but his name is nowhere to be found in the published list of students. On 7 February 1682, apothecary Charles Watts, who served as curator of Chelsea Physic Garden, took him in as an apprentice. After honing his craft with Watts, Sherard moved to Mark Lane, London, where he started his own very successful business. He was elected a Fellow of the Royal Society in 1706.

== Music ==
In time, Sherard came into contact with Wriothesley Russell, 2nd Duke of Bedford through his brother, who had once served as a tutor in Russell's family. Sherard dedicated his first set of trio sonatas (1701, op. 1) to Russell. Printed by Estienne Roger in Amsterdam, the piece is based on Italian sonatas, perhaps those of Arcangelo Corelli. Sherard may have helped premiere the work himself, performing on the violin alongside the Duke's two Italian chamber musicians, cellist Nicola Francesco Haym and violinist Nicola Cosimi. One surviving copy of the work was owned by an apothecary named William Salter. He wrote commentary in the margins, including a note that Sherard was friends with George Frideric Handel; this is plausible considering the two's mutual acquaintance in Haym. Sherard published a second set of trio sonatas in 1711. Both sets are in da chiesa form. Sherard's extensive collection of manuscripts of vocal and instrumental music is preserved in the Bodleian Library, and includes unique copies of German church music among other items.

== Botany ==
In 1711, around the time Sherard finished composing his second set of sonatas, the Duke died, and Sherard's interest in music seems to have died with him. He also fell ill with gout, which prevented him from playing the violin. Instead, he turned to botany; he wrote in August 1716 that "of late the love of Botany has so far prevailed as to divert my mind from things I formerly thought more material". Upon retiring from his business in Mark Lane in the 1720s, he had already acquired an ample fortune. He purchased two manors in Leicestershire and a property at Eltham in Kent, near London, where he largely resided.

Sherard soon found himself maintaining a growing collection of rare plants at Eltham. Despite his ill health, he made several trips to continental Europe in search of seeds for his garden, which soon became recognized as one of the finest in England. In 1721, in order to help with a projected revision of Caspar Bauhin's Pinax of 1623, William Sherard brought the German botanist Johann Jacob Dillenius to England. In 1732, James published Dillenius' s illustrated catalog of the collection at Eltham. According to Blanche Henrey it was "the most important book to be published in England during the eighteenth century on the plants growing in a private garden" and a major work for the pre-Linnaean taxonomy of South African plants, notably the succulents of the Cape Province. Dillenius' herbarium specimens from Eltham are preserved in the herbarium of the Oxford Botanical Garden.

== Later life ==
In 1728, Sherard's brother died, and he was left in charge of executing William's will. He successfully negotiated his brother's endowment of the Sherardian Professorship of Botany at the University of Oxford; following the terms of the will, Dillenius was named the first Sherardian Professor. For his work in endowing the professorship, Sherard was granted a doctorate in medicine by the university in 1731.

On his death in 1738, he had amassed a fortune of £150,000. He was survived by his wife Susanna, with whom he had no children, and was buried at the Evington parish church in Leicestershire.
