= William Sherard =

English botanist

William Sherard (27 February 1659 – 11 August 1728) was an English botanist who, alongside John Ray, was considered to be a highly notable English botanist of his day, though recognition of his work was hampered by his lower class origins.

== Life ==
Sherard was born in Bushby, Leicestershire and studied at St John's College, Oxford, from 1677 to 1683. He studied botany from 1686 to 1688 in Paris under Joseph Pitton de Tournefort and was a friend and pupil of Paul Hermann in Leyden from 1688 to 1689 who also studied with Tournefort at this time. In 1690 he was in Ireland as tutor to the family of Sir Arthur Rawdon at Moira, County Down.

Sherard was British Consul at Smyrna from 1703 to 1716, during which time he accumulated a fortune. When he returned to England he became a patron of other naturalists, including Johann Jacob Dillenius, Pietro Antonio Micheli, Paolo Boccone and Mark Catesby. He was also instrumental in the publication of Sebastien Vaillant's Botanicon parisiense (1727) and Hermann's Musaeum zeylanica. With his money, he endowed the Chair of Botany at Oxford University with the stipulation that it go to Dillenius. On his death James Sherard was left in charge of executing William's will. He successfully negotiated his brother's endowment of the Sherardian Professorship of Botany at the University of Oxford; following the terms of the will, Dillenius was named the first Sherardian Professor. For his work in endowing the professorship, Sherard was granted a doctorate in medicine by the university in 1731.

== Works ==
Sherard helped shape the face of taxonomy which at the time was still in flux. His work with Ray, Tournefort, Vaillant Hermann and Dillenius helped considerably define the work of Linnaeus, the father of modern taxonomy.

He contributed to John Ray's Stirpium published in 1694. He co-edited Paul Hermann's Paradisus Batavus (1698) after Hermann's death in 1695. In about 1700 he embarked on a continuation of Caspar Bauhin's Pinax which he never finished.

William Sherard was the brother of James Sherard. Dillenius's famous Hortus Elthamensis, which was often cited by Linnaeus was a description of the rare plants that James Sherard grew in his garden in Eltham in Kent (now within the confines of Greater London). As stated on the title page and in the preface of Dillenius's work, William Sherard did a great deal of the taxonomic part of the work.

Genus Sherardia was named in his honour by Sébastien Vaillant in 1718.
