= Miles Atkinson =

The Reverend Miles Atkinson
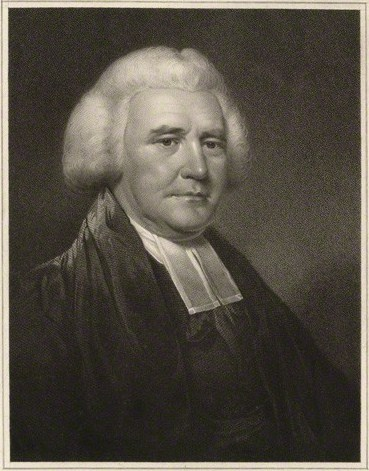
- Atkinson, engraved 1816 by William Holl the Elder from a painting by John Russell
- Born: 28 September 1741
- Died: 6 February 1811 (aged 69)
- Education: Peterhouse, Cambridge
- Spouse: Mary (m. 1768)
- Religion: Anglicanism
- Church: Church of England
- Ordained: 1764 (deacon); 1766 (priest)

Miles Atkinson (28 September 1741 – 6 February 1811) was an English Anglican clergyman. He was one of the mid-century evangelicals in Yorkshire.

== Biography ==
Atkinson was born on 28 September 1741 in Ledsham, Yorkshire, England, to the Reverend Christopher Atkinson, rector of Thorp Arch. His younger brother was the poet William Atkinson. He was educated at Peterhouse, Cambridge, graduating Bachelor of Arts (BA) in 1763.

Atkinson was ordained in the Church of England as a deacon on 18 March 1764 and as a priest on 25 May 1766. He served his curacy at the parish church of Leeds, before becoming headmaster of the school of Drighlington, near Leeds (1764–70); he was also lecturer of the parish church of Leeds in 1769. In 1783, he was appointed vicar of Kippax, near Leeds. At a cost of nearly £10,000 (equivalent to £1.25 million in 2025), he founded and built St Paul's Church, Park Square, Leeds, of which he became minister in 1793. He was also responsible for construction of St Paul's vicarage in 1790.

In April 1768, Atkinson married Mary Kenion. Together, they had at least two sons.

Atkinson died on 6 February 1811. He was buried at St Paul's Church, Leeds.

== Works ==
Atkinson published several pulpit discourses, and a collection of his Practical Sermons was published at London in two volumes, 1812.
