= Sherardian Professor of Botany =

Professorship in the University of Oxford

The Sherardian Chair of Botany is a professorship at the University of Oxford that was established in 1734. It was created following an endowment by William Sherard on his death in 1728. In his will, Sherard stipulated that the first holder of the chair was to be Johann Jacob Dillenius. The Sherardian Professor is also a fellow of Magdalen College, Oxford

== List of Sherardian Professors of Botany ==
- Johann Jacob Dillenius (1734 to 1747)
- Humphry Sibthorp (1747 to 1783)
- John Sibthorp (1784 to 1796)
- George Williams (1796 to 1834)
- Charles Giles Bridle Daubeny (1834 to 1867)
- Marmaduke Alexander Lawson (1868 to 1882)
- Isaac Bayley Balfour (1884 to 1888)
- Sydney Howard Vines (1888 to 1919)
- Frederick Keeble (1920 to 1927)
- Arthur Tansley (1927 to 1937)
- Theodore Osborn (1937 to 1953)
- C. D. Darlington (1953 to 1971)
- F. R. Whatley (1971 to 1991)
- Hugh G. Dickinson (1991 to 2009)
- Liam Dolan (2009 to 2021)
- Lars Østergaard (2022 to present)
