= Whitechapel Church, Cleckheaton =

Church in Cleckheaton, West Yorkshire, England

Coordinates: 53.730°N 1.726°W

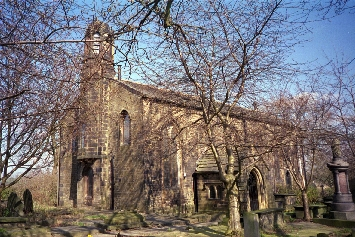
Whitechapel church

Whitechapel Church, is an unusual church building located approximately half a mile north of Cleckheaton, West Yorkshire, England. It was built in 1820 on a site associated with over nine centuries of worship. It has supported Roman Catholic, Protestant, Puritan, Methodist and Anglican worship during its history. Links with this site of worship have been made to the Romans, the Brontës, the Knights Hospitaller, a grave slab of one of the knights being in the entrance to the church, Celtic influences, and in recent times the graveyard contains war graves from the world wars. Legend also has it that Robin Hood is connected with this site of worship.

== History of the site ==
A suggestion, which at present cannot be substantiated, is that Whitechapel church stands on a pack-horse route which followed the line of an old Roman road from York to Chester. This theory originates from the discovery of a large hoard of Roman coins near the present site of Whitcliffe Mount School. Although no archeological evidence was found, it is thought there could have been a Roman station there. It is also possible there was a wooden Saxon place of worship on the site although there is no evidence for this. Cleckheaton is recorded in the Domesday Book, 1086, but there is no record of a church on this site at this time.

There has been a place of worship on this site since the Norman times. The evidence for this is the font, dated as not later than 1120. The carvings upon it include a Sheela Na Gig. It is quite wonderful, considering the font's history, that babies are still baptized in it today.

The site was initially developed as Heaton Chapel, a Chapel of ease to the Parish Church of Birstall. This was a huge parish extending from Bradford to Dewsbury. Whitechapel covered the hamlets of Scholes and Oakenshaw, and the townships of Wyke and Cleckheaton, 'that no man may die without baptism'. This was for the convenience of the local people, due to the distance to travel to Birstall. A Chapel of Ease had the right of baptism and Sunday services, but it was still necessary to travel to Birstall for marriages and funerals until 1706, when Whitechapel was granted the right of burial. A number of gravestones dating from this period can be found in the grounds. The churchyard today has over 1000 graves; most of these were documented by a Mr. A. Blackburn of Bradford in 1928. Volunteers are currently in the process of updating this document. It was not until 1837 that marriages could be performed at this church.

Prior to 1534, the site was a Roman Catholic church and the Medieval Latin mass was celebrated here. There would be no seats in the church, the worshippers kneeling on rush matting on stone floors. The church porch would often be used for business.

In 1534, following the Act of Supremacy, the parish of Birstall including the chapels of ease at Whitechapel and Tong became Church of England. Queen Elizabeth I was much more tolerant of religious persuasions, and both Catholic and Protestant worship was allowed.

In 1611, James I ordered an authorised version of the bible and prayer book in English. The Book of Common Prayer is still in use at Whitechapel once a month for a mid week Communion service and Evensong.

From 1644 to 1660, during the time of the puritans, the church was used as a Non Conformist chapel. It is thought that during this time the font, with its lewd engravings, was removed to the churchyard.

Following the restoration of the Monarchy in 1660, it became illegal to worship God in any manner other than that provided by the Anglican Church. This meant that the Non Conformists had to find secret places to worship, and moved away from Whitechapel. It was following this that the church appears to have been left to its own devices. No vicar is recorded in parish records from 1651 to 1707. The church fell into disrepair, and indeed it is recorded that sheep grazed in the churchyard and their lambs sheltered in the ruins.

Around 1707, the church was rebuilt, a stone above the entrance testifying to this. At this time the Norman font was discovered in the churchyard in a damaged condition. Dr. Richard Richardson, Lord of the manor at this time commissioned a new font, bearing his coat of arms. However, an unknown person must have thought it important to restore the original Norman font. It was repaired, turned upside down and used as the base for the new Richardson font. There are no records of consecration for this new building, however it is said that when the Archbishop of York arrived to consecrate it, he saw a yew tree in the church grounds and said "this is already consecrated ground", got on his horse and rode away. It is recorded that every parish should have a yew tree in its grounds for the purpose of providing bows to the people. Legend has it that Robin Hood himself, cut his bows from this tree. In recent times the dead stump of this tree was moved near the priests door and dated by dendrochronology to the 14thC No trace of this remains now, however a new yew tree was planted for the Millennium. It was from around 1707 that it became known as Ye Olde Whitechapel in the North. This was possibly due to it being whitewashed on the outside. No other buildings are recorded around it at this time.

Worship appears to have continued on a regular basis throughout the 18th century. A stone in the North wall records that The Olde Whitechapel was repaired in 1782, the walls and roof being increased in height. From 1757 to 1771 the incumbent was Jonas Eastwood, an earnest and successful worker in the Methodist cause. He also frequently officiated at Birstall. Methodists appear to have been prominent at Whitechapel during this period. The Rev. John Crosse, 1775–1805, also had strong Methodist convictions and it is reported that John Wesley preached at Whitechapel in 1788.

== The present church ==
By 1820 the church was not big enough for its congregation, and was rebuilt. This is the building which we see today. It had box pews and a fine 3 decker pulpit on the south side. These were all cleared 65 years later, when the church was modernised to face east. All that remains of the pulpit is the sounding board, now built into the south east vestry.

On 7 January 1839 a great storm caused the bell and part of the belfry to crash through the roof, destroying the organ. The Leeds Mercury recorded it as the fiercest gale in living memory. This bell is mounted and displayed within the church, below the current pulpit.

From 1837 to 1886 the Rev. Robert Fetzer Taylor was a much revered incumbent. During his time, a church school was built in Scholes, and Whitechapel became a parish in its own right. In memory of his wife, the Rev. Taylor had the Norman font reinstated on a new plinth and the Richardson font was removed to the churchyard. This now stands in the porch to the church.

During the First World War many young men of the parish lost their lives, including two sons of the then vicar, Rev. T.D. Hyde. A beautiful stained glass window was installed in their memory, and a porch was built as a war memorial to all those who lost their lives during the war.

Church of England worship continued. From 1932 to 1934, the church was renovated internally, electricity and a new heating system were installed. Also an electric blower for the organ was installed. During this period, church services were held at the nearby Moorend School.

In 1980, on the retirement of Canon C.H. Corkett, another long serving incumbent, the parish was combined with St. Lukes, Cleckheaton. In 2002, the parish of St. Luke and Whitechapel renewed its association with Scholes with a combined appointment, and for the first time in its history, Whitechapel welcomed a woman priest-in-charge, the Rev. Maggie McLean. An assistant priest was subsequently appointed to preside at Whitechapel, the Rev. Rachel Cave. In 2009 the Rev. Maggie Mclean moved to the church of Christ the King, Mirfield.
