= Johann Jacob Dillenius =

German botanist (1684-1747)

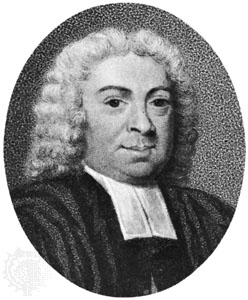
- Born: 1684; Darmstadt, Hesse-Darmstadt
- Died: 2 April 1747; Oxford, England
- Education: University of Giessen
- Known for: Hortus Elthamensis, Historia muscorum
- Scientific career
- Fields: Botany
- Workplaces: Oxford University
- Author abbrev. (botany): Dill.

Johann Jacob Dillen Dillenius (1684 – 2 April 1747) was a German botanist. He is known for his Hortus Elthamensis ("Eltham Garden") on the rare plants around Eltham, London, and for his Historia muscorum ("History of Mosses"), a natural history of lower plants including mosses, liverworts, hornworts, lycopods, algae, lichens and fungi.

== Biography ==
Dillenius was born at Darmstadt and was educated at the University of Giessen, earlier the family name had been changed from Dillen to Dillenius. In 1721, at the instance of the botanist William Sherard (1659–1728), he moved to England. In 1734 Dillenius was appointed Sherardian professor of botany at Oxford, in accordance with the will of Sherard, who at his death in 1728 left the university £3000 for the endowment of the chair, as well as his library and herbarium, all on the condition that Dillenius should be appointed the first professor.

Dillenius died at Oxford, of apoplexy. His manuscripts, books and collections of dried plants, with many drawings, were bought by his successor at Oxford, Dr. Humphry Sibthorp (1713–1797), and ultimately passed into the possession of Oxford University. For an account of his collections preserved at Oxford, see The Dillenian Herbaria, by G. Claridge Druce (Oxford, 1907).

== Work ==
At Giessen Dillenius wrote botanical papers for the Ephemerides naturae curiosorum. He printed, in 1719, his flora of the university's surroundings, a Catalogus plantarum sponte circa Gissam nascentium, illustrated with figures he had personally drawn and engraved, with descriptions of several new species.

In 1724 Dillenius published the third edition of John Ray's Synopsis Methodica Stirpium Britannicarum. It incorporated plant species discovered by Samuel Brewer, and work on mosses by Adam Buddle. It remained a standard reference for British botanists until the appearance of Carl Linnaeus's Species Plantarum in 1761.

=== Hortus Elthamensis ===
In 1732 he published Hortus Elthamensis, a substantial catalogue in two volumes of some 400 plants growing at Eltham, London, in the collection of Sherard's younger brother, James (1666—1738), who, after making a fortune as an apothecary, devoted himself to gardening and music. For this work Dillenius himself drew and engraved 324 plates, containing 417 figures of the plants. The title called the plants "rare", but the botanist Will Tjaden comments that they were "often only uncommon and not always of very recent introduction." The book was described by Linnaeus, who spent a month with him at Oxford in 1736, and afterwards dedicated his Critica Botanica to him, as opus botanicum quo absolutius mundus non vidit, "a botanical work of which the world has not seen one more authoritative". Linnaeus later named a genus of tropical tree Dillenia in his honour.

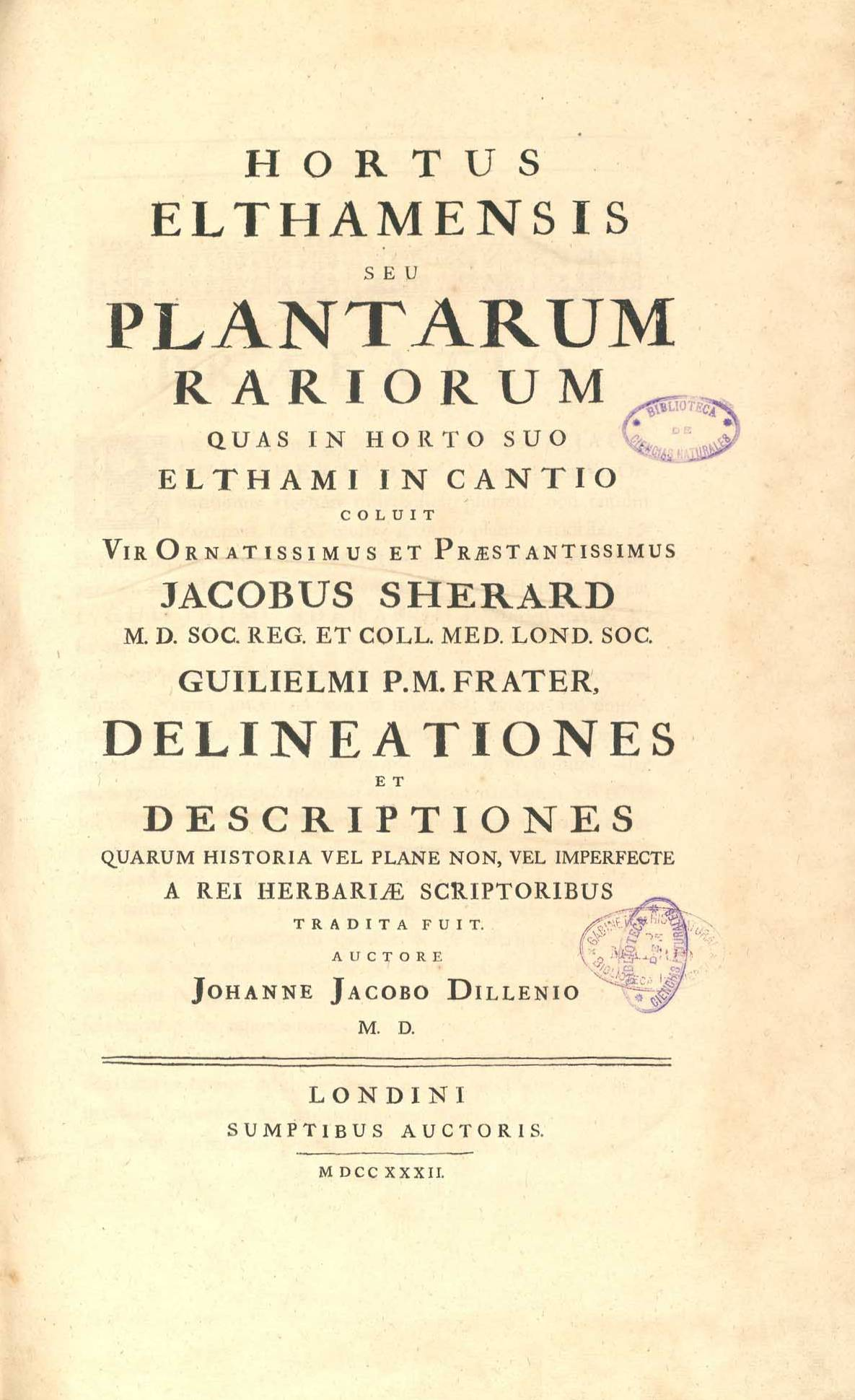
Title page of Hortus Elthamensis, 1732

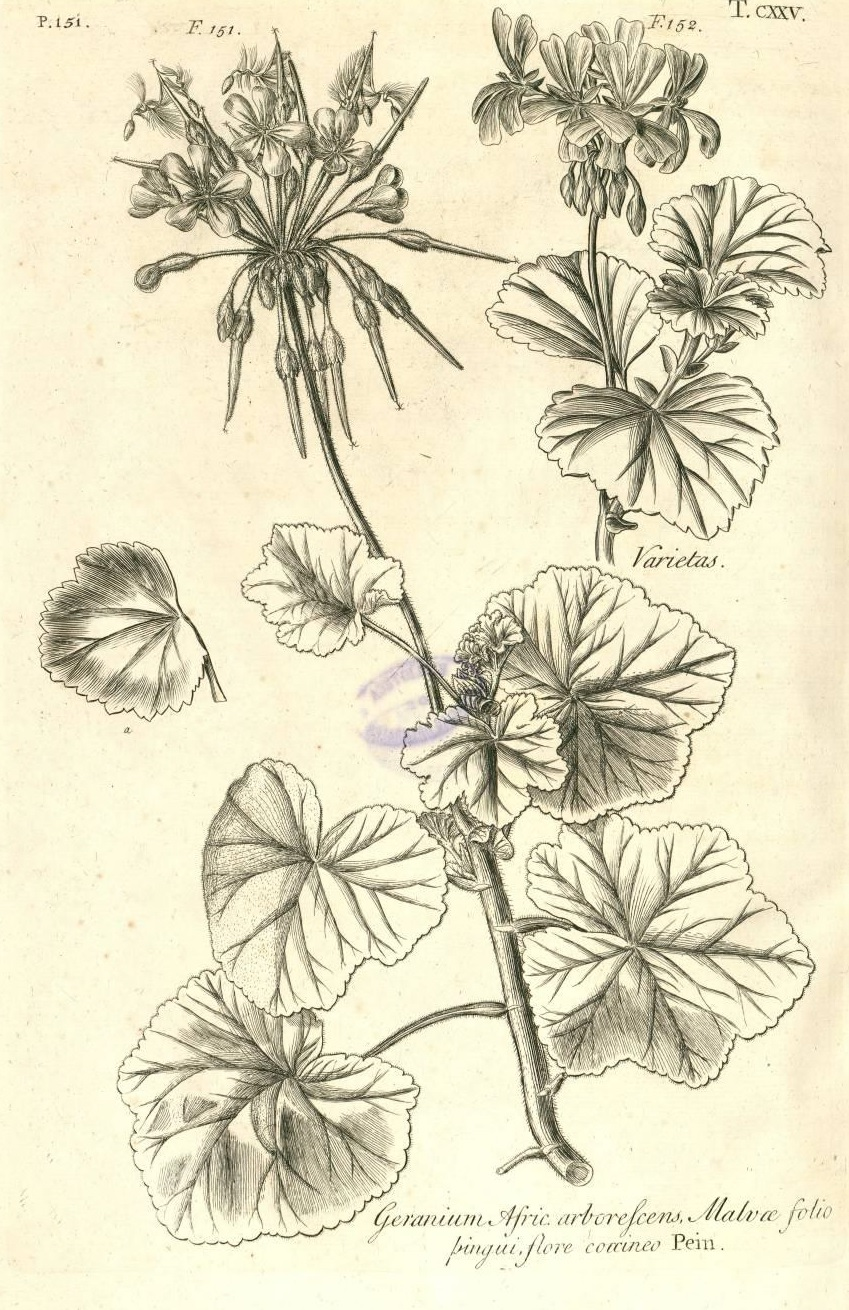
Pelargonium inquinans

=== Historia muscorum ===
Dillenius wrote Historia muscorum (1741), a natural history of lower plants including mosses, liverworts, hornworts, lycopods, algae, lichens and fungi. He acknowledged the help of George Charles Deering. They had met at John Martyn's club for botanists, and had studied fungi together.

Sample of plates with original titles (and notes)

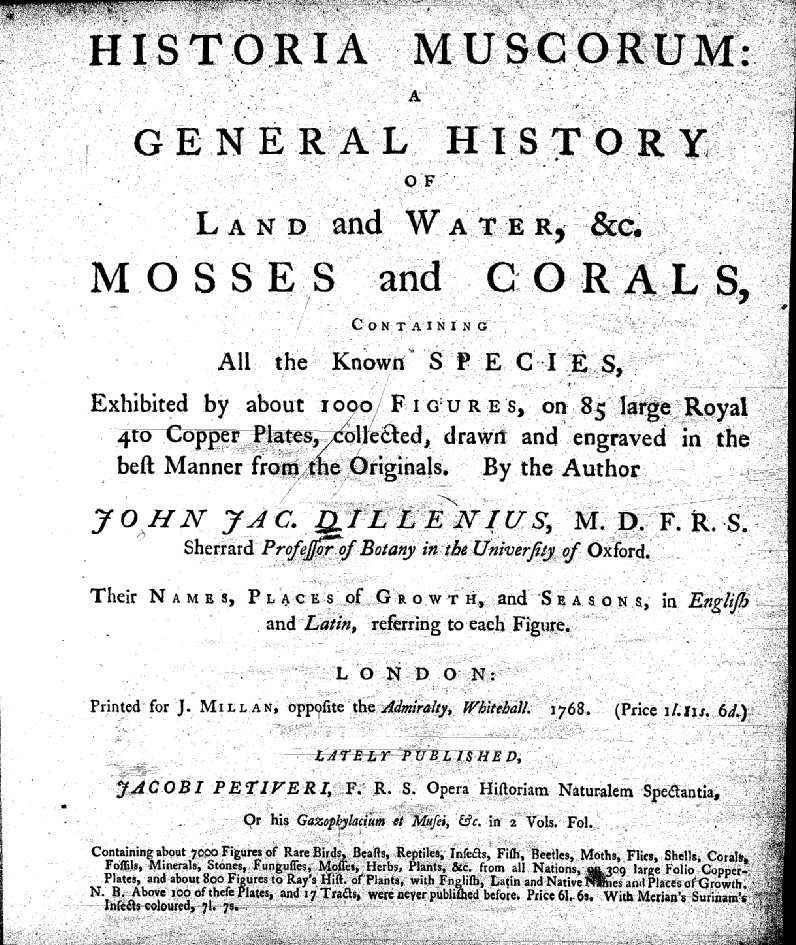
Title page, 1768 edition

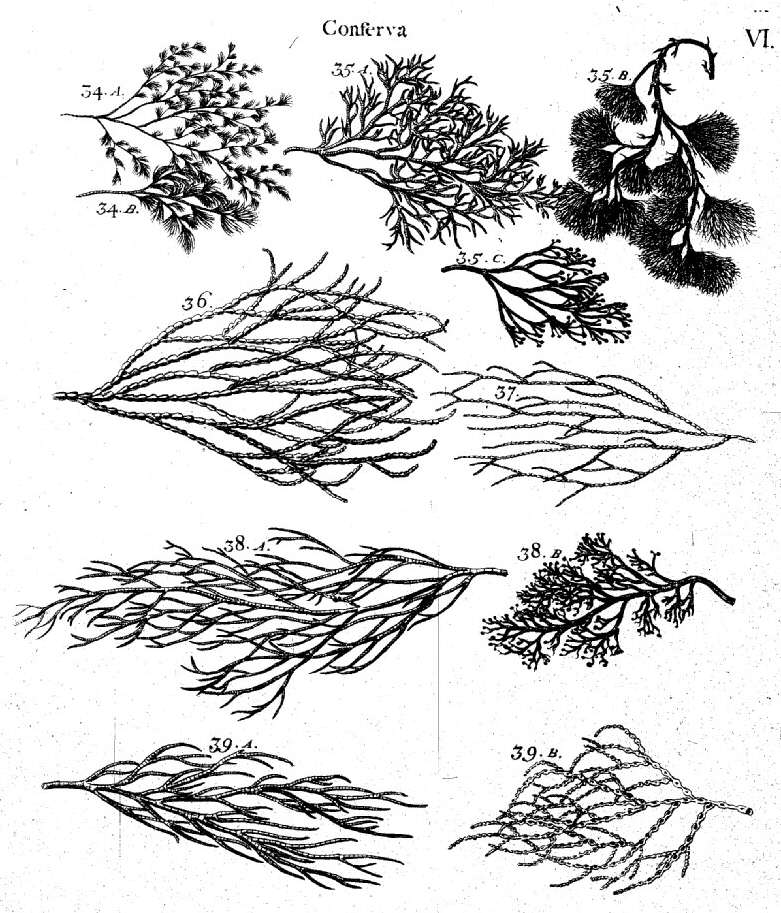
6 Conferva

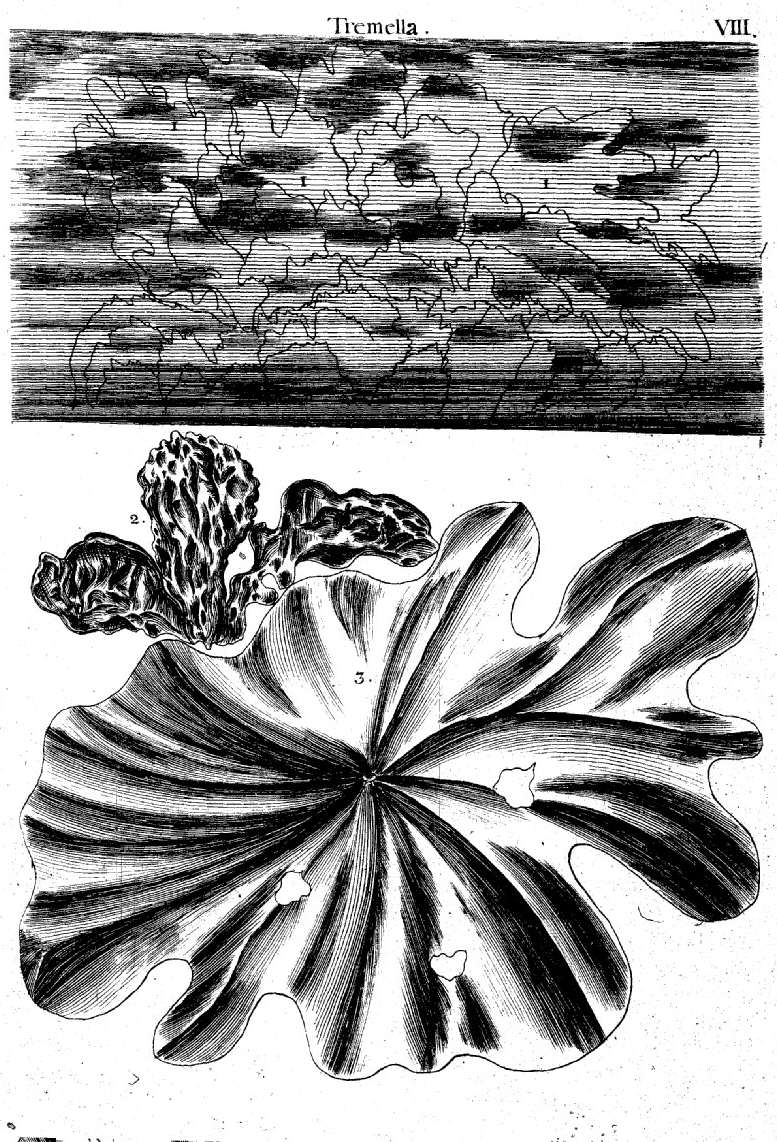
8 Tremella

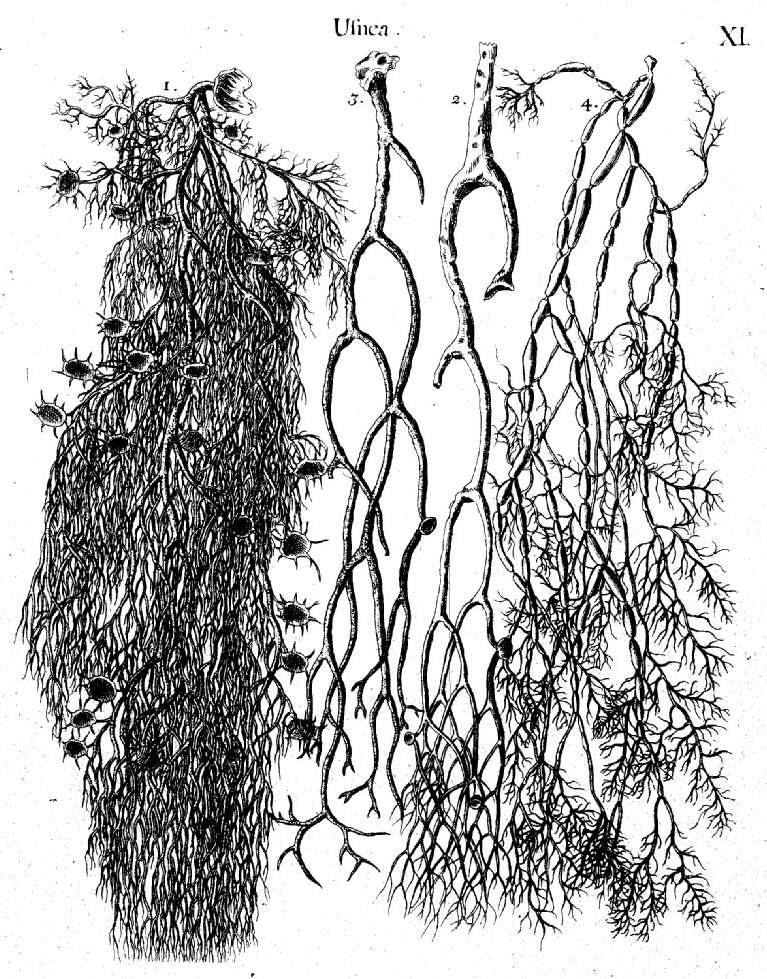
11 Usnea (beard lichens)

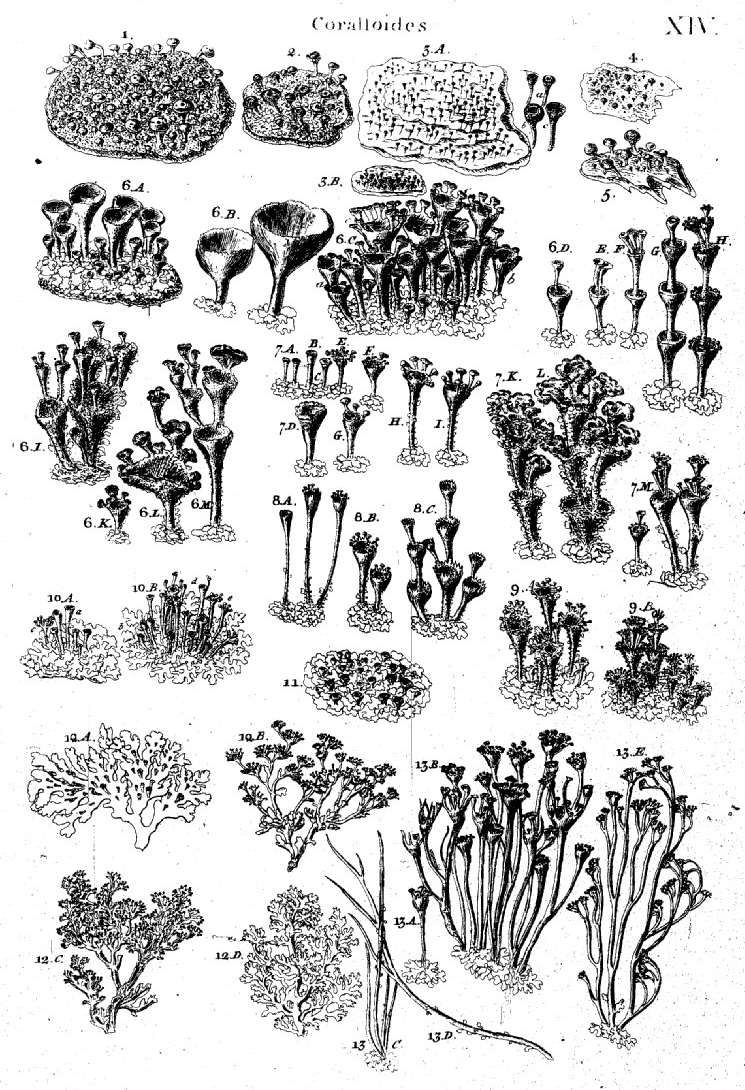
14 Coralloides (cup lichens)

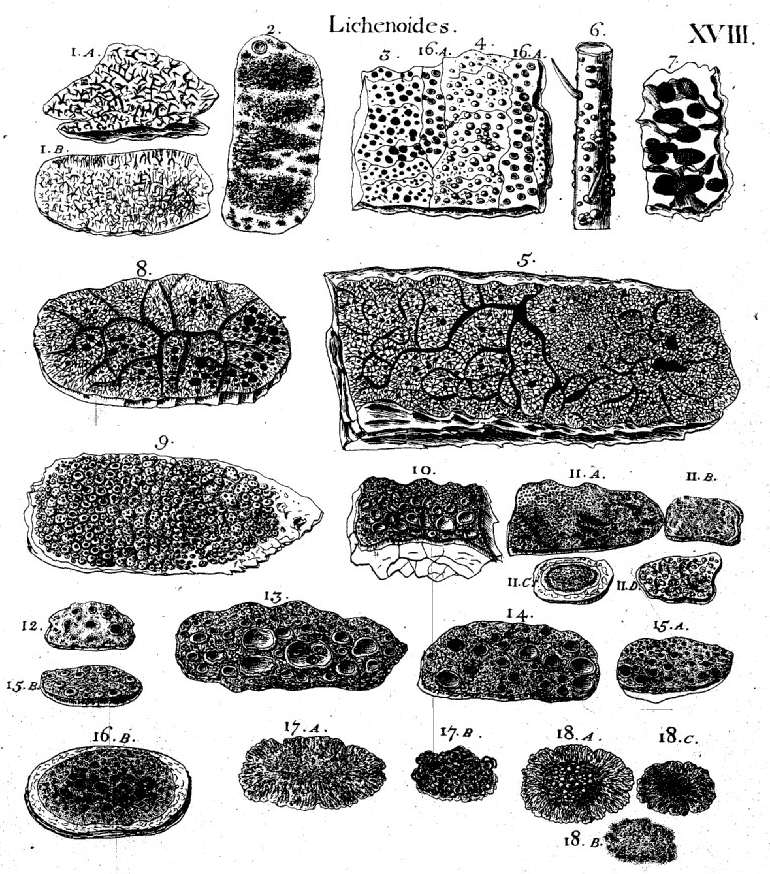
18 Lichenoides (crustose lichens)

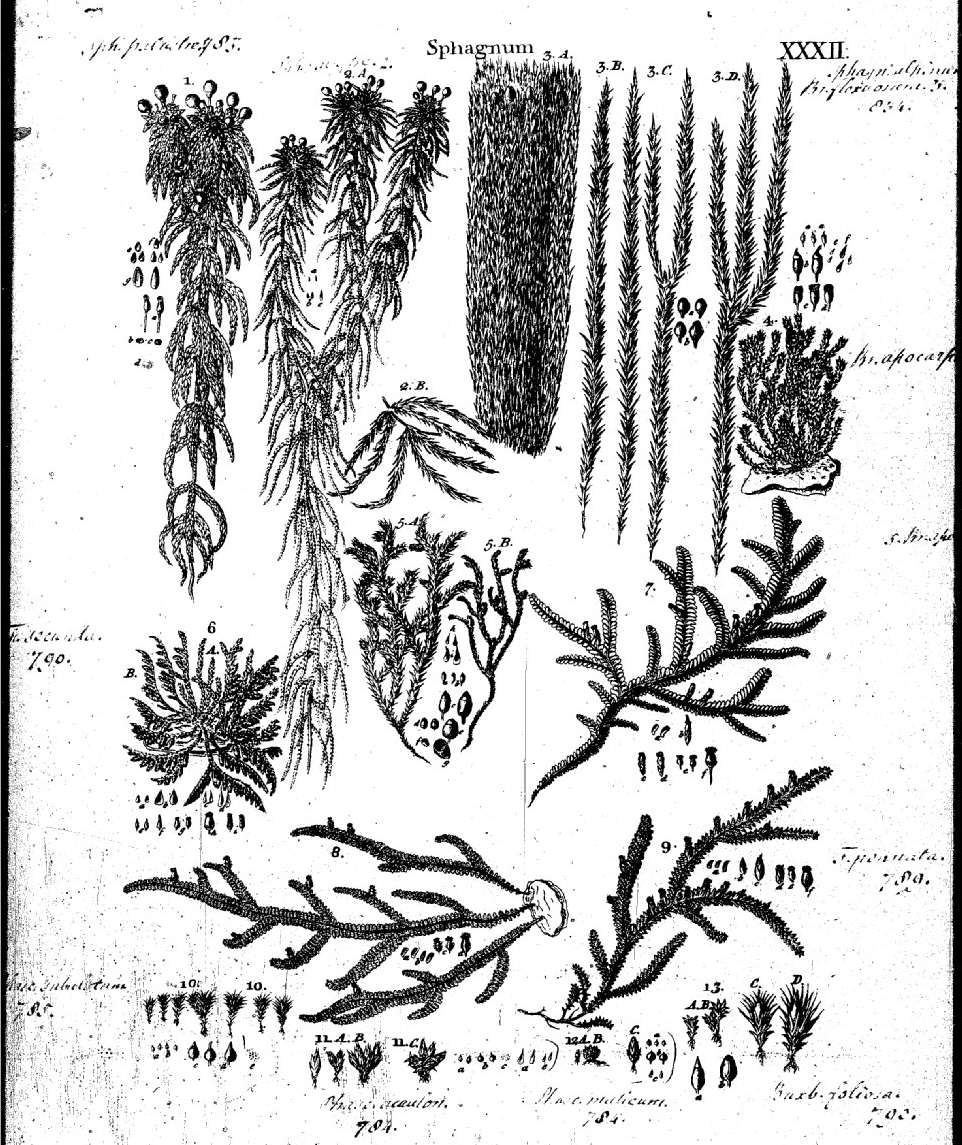
32 Sphagnum (bog moss)

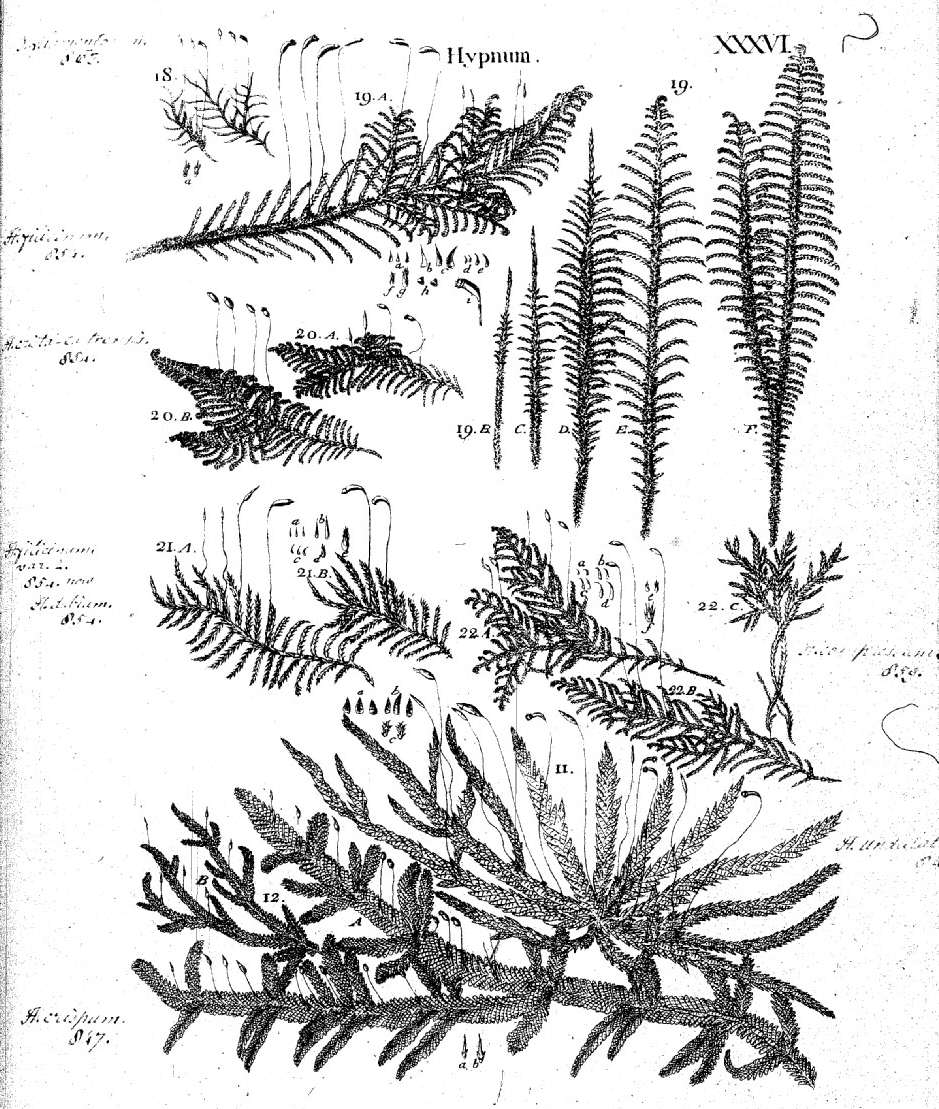
38 Hypnum

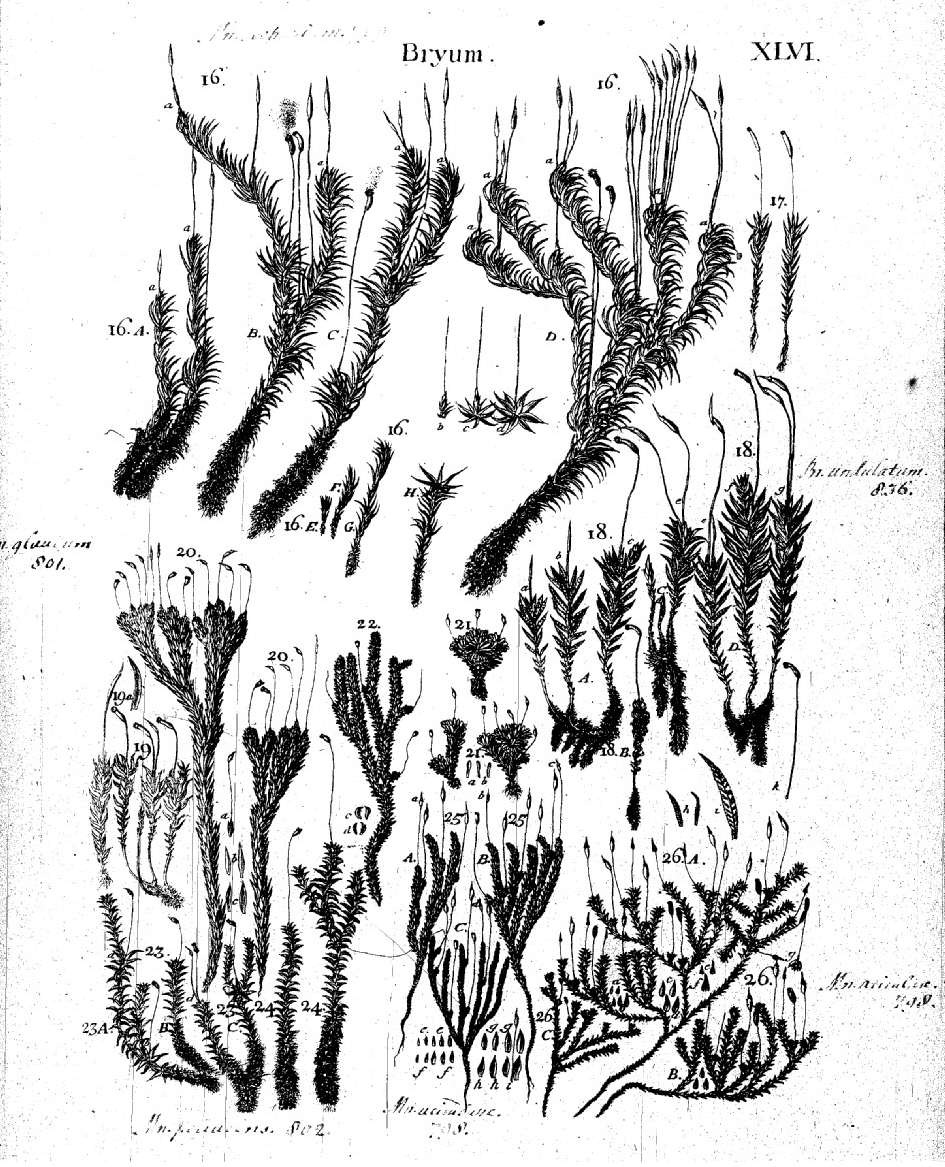
46 Bryum

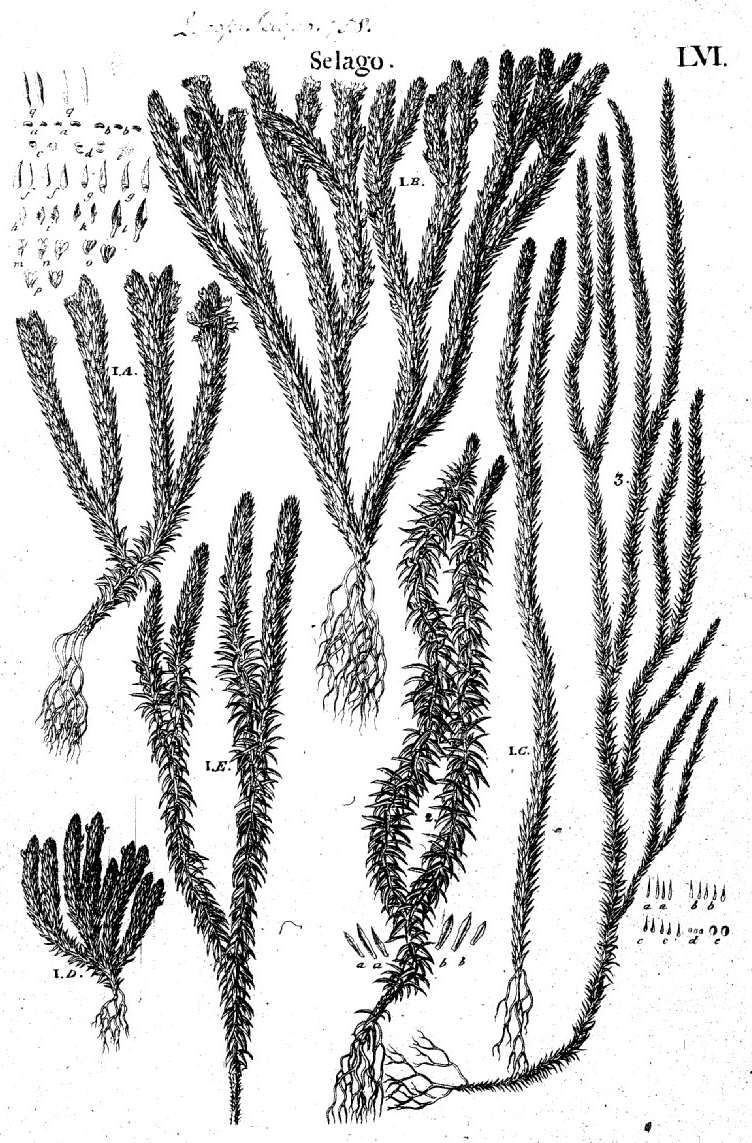
56 Selago

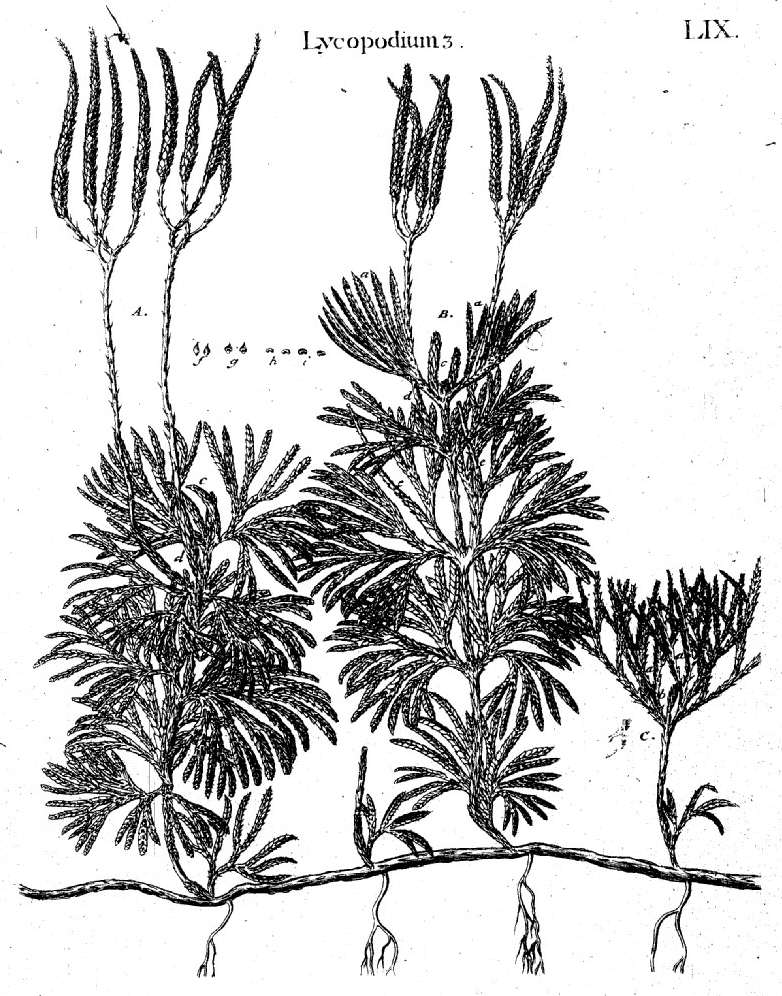
59 Lycopodium

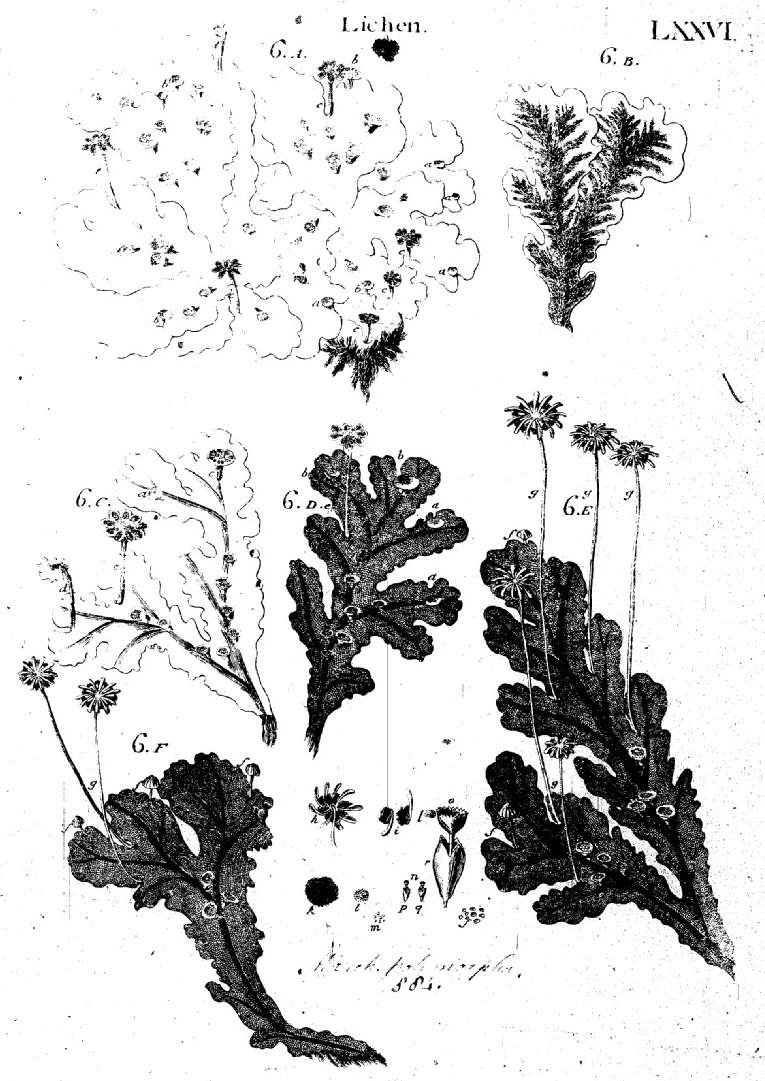
76 Lichen (liverworts)

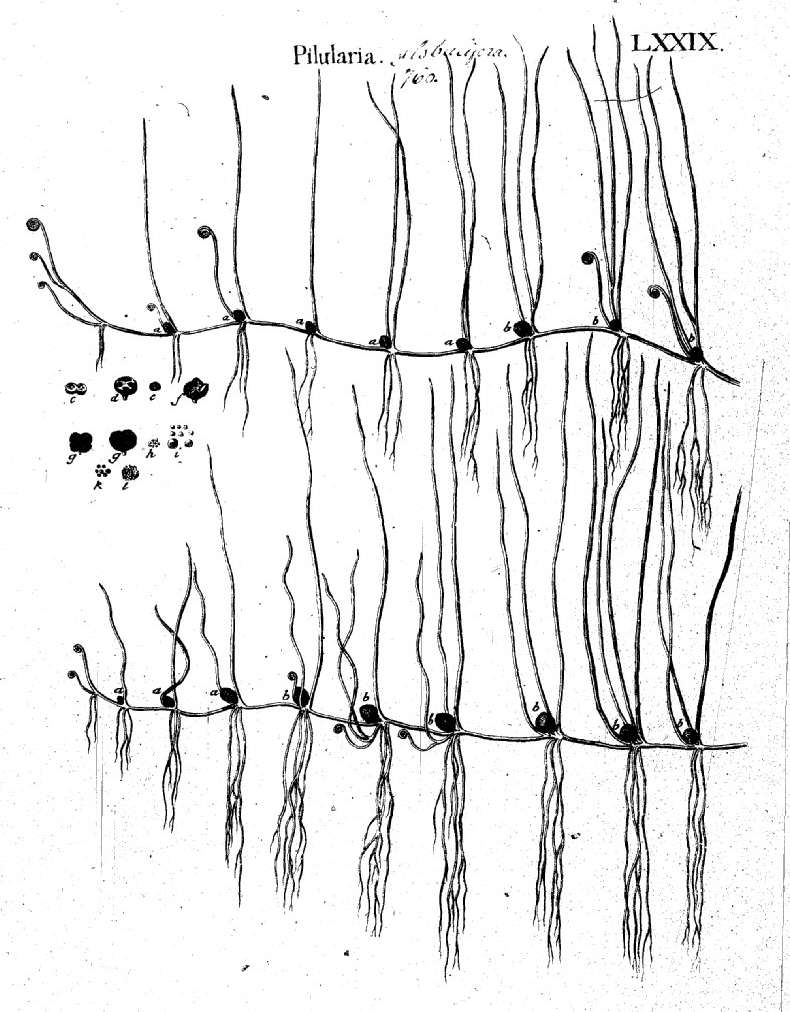
79 Pilularia

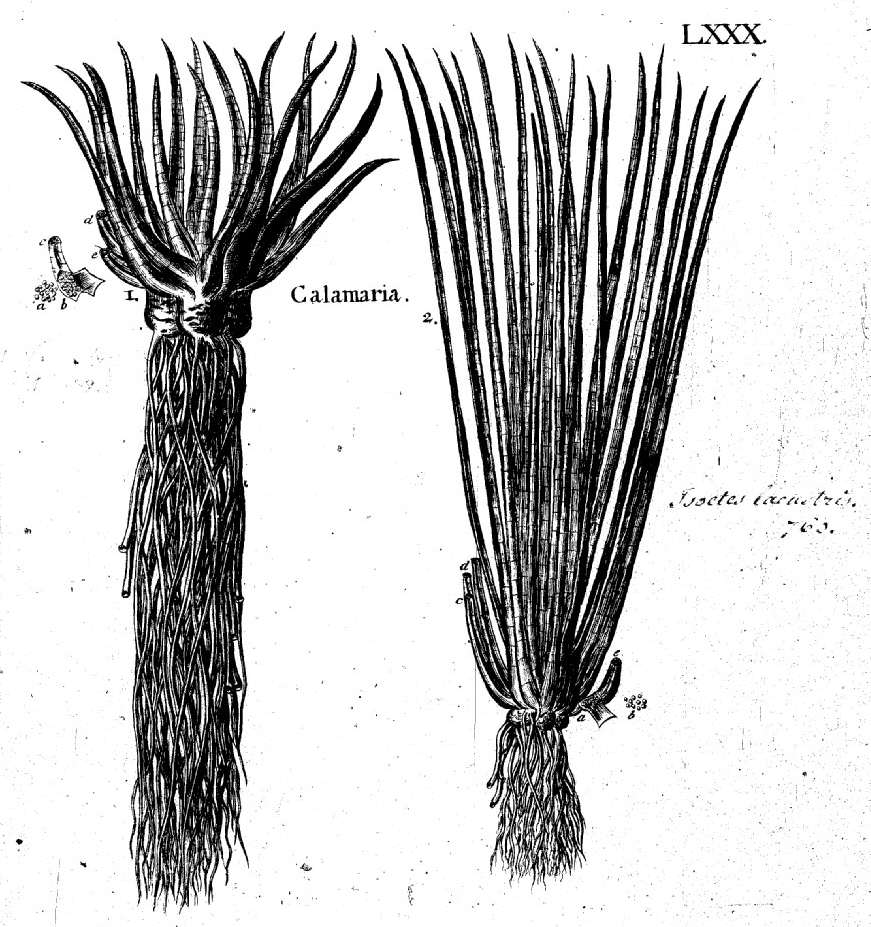
80 Calamaria

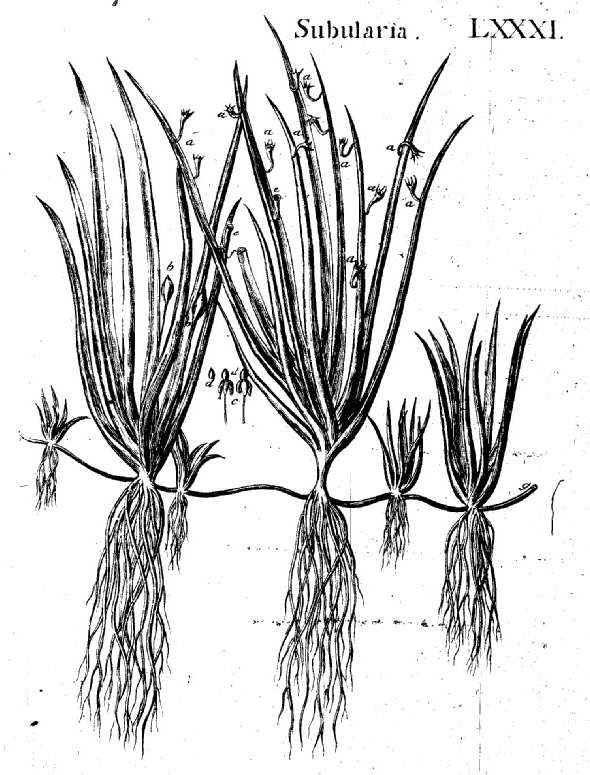
81 Subularia

== Honours ==
In 1753, Carl Linnaeus in his Species Plantarum published Dillenia, a genus of flowering plants in the family Dilleniaceae, native to tropical and subtropical regions of southern Asia, Australasia, and the Indian Ocean islands, both genus and family named in Dillenius's honour.

In 1997, the Spanish botanist Gerardo Antonio Aymard Corredor published Neodillenia, a genus of flowering plants from South America belonging to the family Dilleniaceae, named in Dillenius's honour.

== Selected publications ==
- Dillenius, Johann Jakob (1732). Hortus Elthamensis, seu Plantarum rariorum, quas in horto suo Elthami in Cantio coluit ... Jacobus Sherard ... Guilielmi ... frater delineationes et descriptiones. London: Sumptibus auctoris. Archived from the original on 4 March 2016.
  - also on Gallica
- Ray, John (1724) [1690]. Dillenius, Johann Jacob (ed.). Synopsis methodica stirpium Britannicarum: in qua tum notae generum characteristicae traduntur, tum species singulae breviter describuntur: ducentae quinquaginta plus minus novae species partim suis locis inseruntur, partim in appendice seorsim exhibentur: cum indice & virium epitome (editio tertia multis locis emendata, & quadringentis quinquaginta circiter speciebus noviter detectis aucta ) [Synopsis of British plants] (in Latin) (3rd ed.). London: Gulielmi & Joaniis Innys.
  - Facsimile edition 1973 Archived 20 March 2017 at the Wayback Machine, Ray Society, London. With introduction by William T. Stearn. ISBN 978-0-903874-00-7
- Dillenius, John Jac. (1768). Historia Muscorum: A General History of Land and Water, &c. Mosses and Corals, Containing All the Known Species, Exhibited by about 1000 Figures, on 85 large Royal 4to Copper Plates, collected, drawn and engraved in the best Manner from the Originals. Opposite the Admiralty, Whitehall, London: J. Millan.

== Bibliography ==
- Illustrations from Johann Jacob Dillenius Hortus Elthamensis 1732
- Dictionary of Scientific Biography
