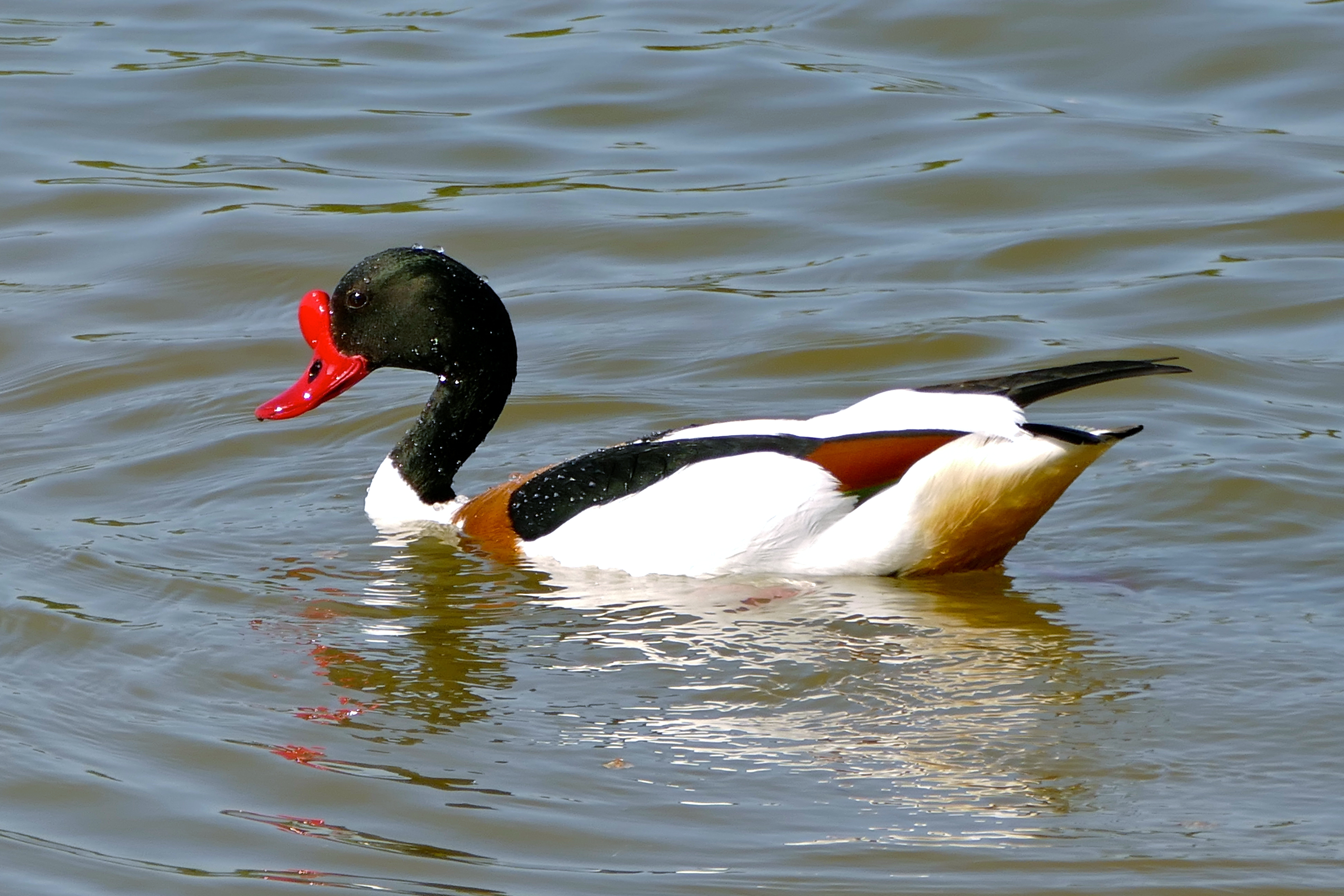
- Adult male
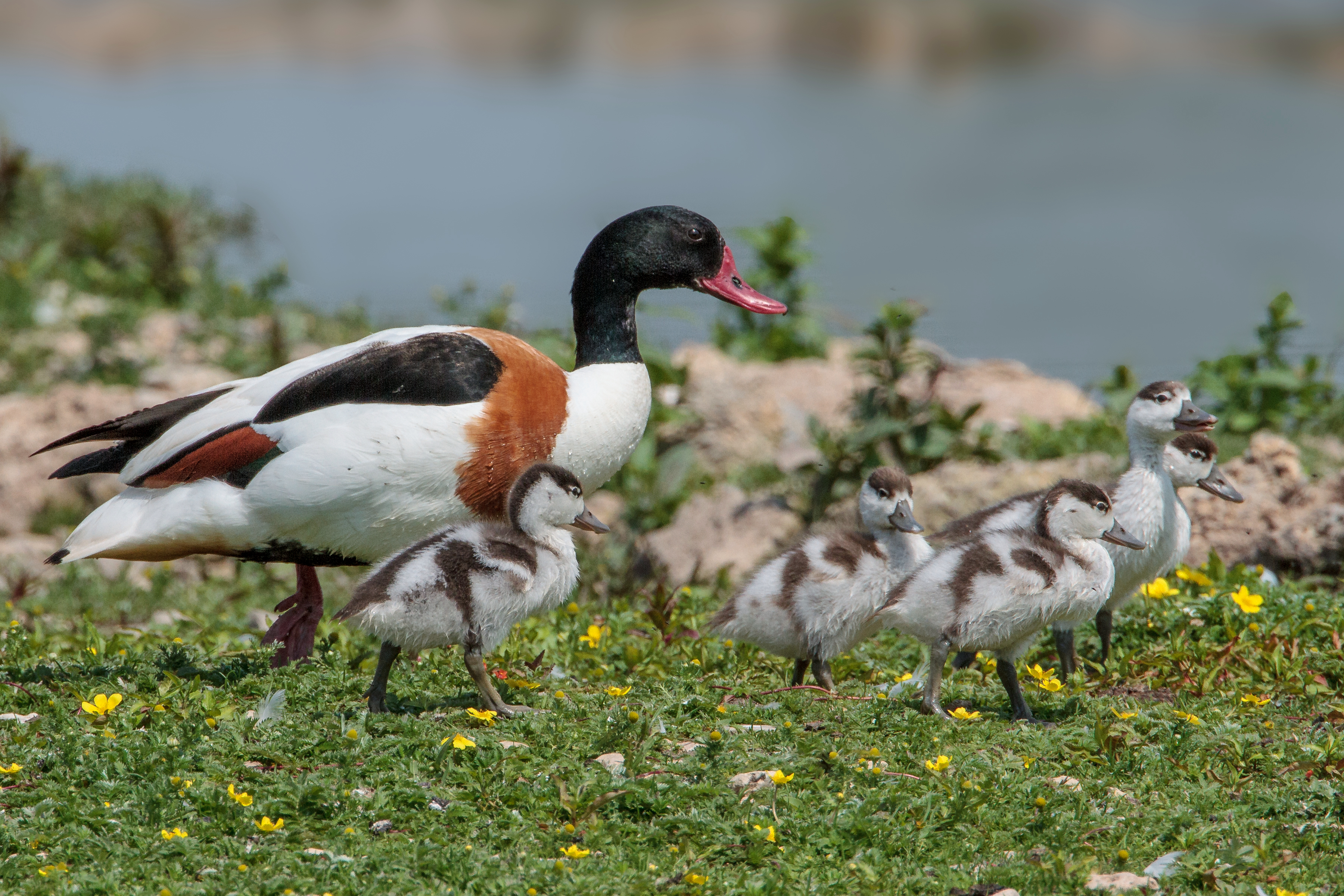
- Adult female with ducklings Female sounds recorded in England

Conservation status
- Least Concern (IUCN 3.1)

Scientific classification
- Kingdom: Animalia
- Phylum: Chordata
- Class: Aves
- Order: Anseriformes
- Family: Anatidae
- Genus: Tadorna
- Species: T. tadorna

Binomial name
- Tadorna tadorna (Linnaeus, 1758)
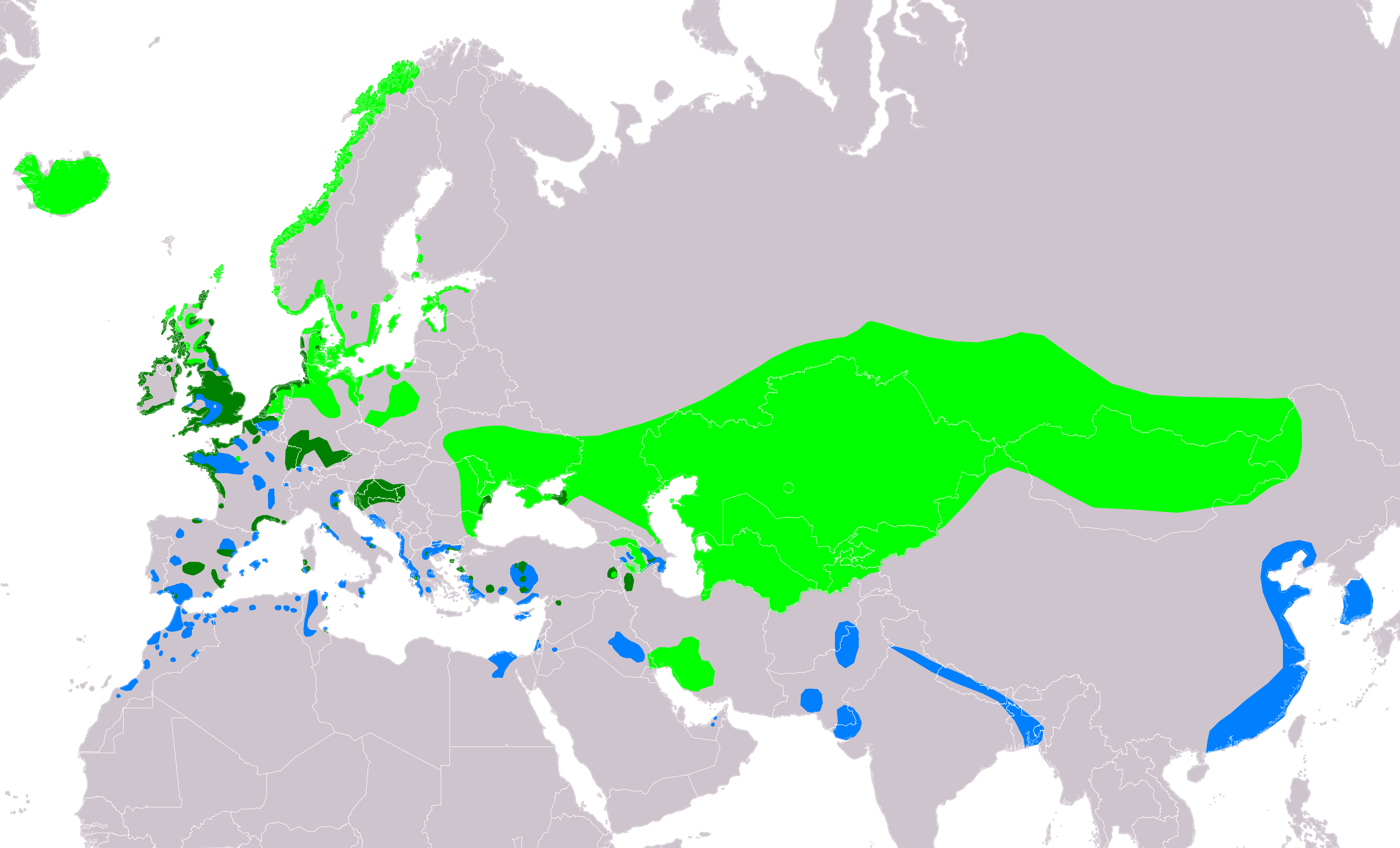
- Range of T. tadorna (Compiled by BirdLife International and Handbook of the Birds of the World (2019) 2019.) Breeding Resident Non-breeding

Synonyms
- Anas tadorna Linnaeus, 1758

= Common shelduck =

Species of bird

The common shelduck (Tadorna tadorna) is a waterfowl species of the shelduck genus Tadorna. It is widespread and common in the Palearctic, in Europe and northwest Africa mainly breeding on temperate coasts, saline pools and estuaries, and in Asia on inland salt lakes; increasingly it is also using open freshwater habitats inland. Wintering is in temperate to subtropical regions.

== Taxonomy ==
The common shelduck was formally named by the Swedish naturalist Carl Linnaeus in 1758 in the tenth edition of his Systema Naturae under the binomial name Anas tadorna. Linnaeus largely based his description on "The Sheldrake or Burrough-Duck" that had been described and illustrated in 1731 by the English naturalist Eleazar Albin. The specific epithet comes from the French word Tadorne for this species, a name that was used by the French naturalist Pierre Belon in 1555. It may originally derive from Celtic roots meaning "pied waterfowl", essentially the same as the English "shelduck". Linnaeus specified the locality as Europe but restricted this to Sweden in 1761. The common shelduck is now placed in the genus Tadorna that was introduced in 1822 by the German zoologist Friedrich Boie. The species is monotypic, with no subspecies being recognised.

== Description ==
The common shelduck resembles a small short-necked goose in size and shape. It is 55–65 cm long and with a wingspan of 100–120 cm, with a reddish-pink bill, pink feet, a white body with chestnut patches and a black belly, and a dark green head and neck. The wing coverts are white, the primary remiges black, and the secondaries black with a strong green iridescent reflection in good light (only showing in flight). The outer tertial feather is orange-brown, with the inner tertials white. The underwings are white, except for the flight feathers, which are black. The sexes are similar, but the female is slightly smaller, usually with some white flecks on the green face, while the male is particularly crisply coloured in the breeding season, his bill bright red and bearing a prominent knob at the base of the bill.

The ducklings are white, with blackish-brown cap, hindneck and wing and back patches. Juveniles are similarly coloured, greyish above and mostly white below, but already have the adult's wing pattern.

The call is a loud honk.

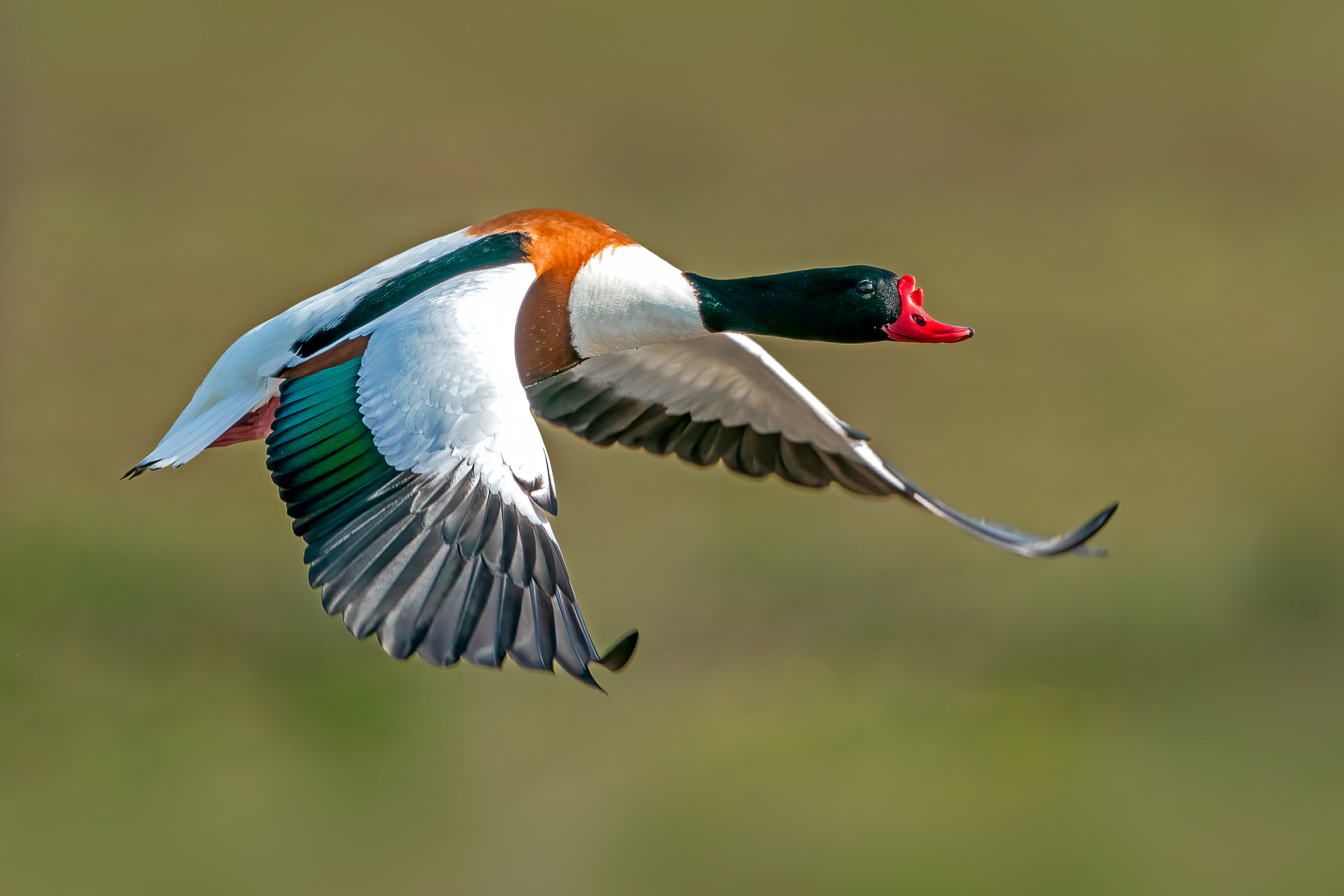
Male in flight

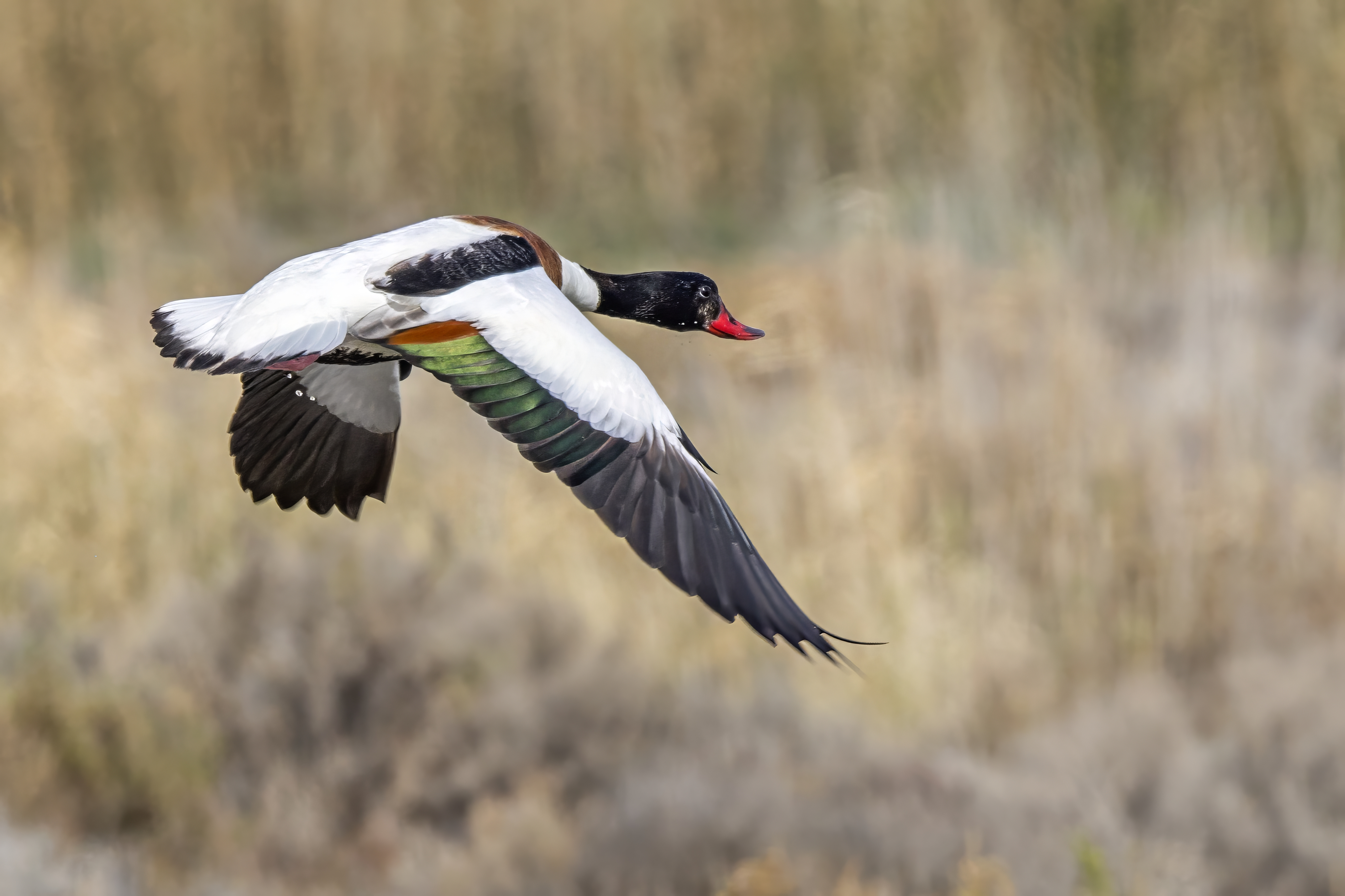
Female in flight

== Distribution and habitat ==
This is a bird which breeds in the temperate Palearctic region. It has increased and spread markedly since the mid 20th century; at that time in Europe it was strongly restricted to coasts, estuaries and other saline habitats, but is now widespread inland in open freshwater wetlands. It has also spread northwards; in the mid 20th century, it only reached north to 66°N latitude in Norway, but by 2020 had spread along the entire Norwegian coast and into northwestern Russia, including since 2000 in the Murmansk area and the White Sea. Breeding has also expanded south, with extensive colonisation of the Iberian Peninsula, where it formerly only wintered. Much of the increase is thought to be related to improved protection from hunting, but also increased eutrophication of estuaries and wetlands increasing the availability of food. In northwest Africa, breeding is restricted to Tunisia, but it is more widespread in winter west to Morocco.

Asian populations migrate to subtropical areas in winter, south to northern India and southern China, but this species is largely resident in Europe, apart Scandinavian and some eastern European populations which migrate southwest, and from movements to favoured late summer moulting grounds, such as the Wadden Sea on the north German coast.

The common shelduck is common around the coastline of Great Britain and Ireland (where it is known simply as the shelduck), where it frequents salt marshes and estuaries. It frequently nests in rabbit burrows.

Vagrants have been recorded in Barbados, and Newfoundland in Canada.

Fossil bones from Dorkovo in Bulgaria, described as Balcanas pliocaenica, may actually belong to this species. More likely, they are an extinct species of Tadorna (if not a distinct genus) due to their Early Pliocene age; the present species is not unequivocally attested from the fossil record until some 2–3 million years later (Late Pliocene/Early Pleistocene).

=== Captivity ===
Shelduck are attractive birds, and often kept as ornamental wildfowl. Escaped captive birds have been reported as occurring in the United States and Canada. In South America, a record of the species exists in Colombia but is excluded from the national list.

== Behaviour ==
Moulting flocks can be very large (100,000 on the Wadden Sea), since most pairs leave their partially grown young in a crèche with just one or two adults.

This species is mainly associated with estuaries and tidal mudflats, but increasingly also in freshwater lakes and rivers in open country inland, breeding in rabbit burrows, tree holes, haystacks or similar. In winter it is more confined to estuaries and tidal mudflats.

Like geese and swans but unlike most ducks, both parents protect the ducklings and lead them to good feeding areas, which can be up to 3 km from the nest site; only the female broods the young though. The young will dive under water to avoid predators and the adults will fly away from them to act as a decoy.

Shelduck typically breed for the first time when 2 years old; the maximum recorded age is just short of 20 years.

This bird is one of the species to which the Agreement on the Conservation of African-Eurasian Migratory Waterbirds (AEWA) applies.

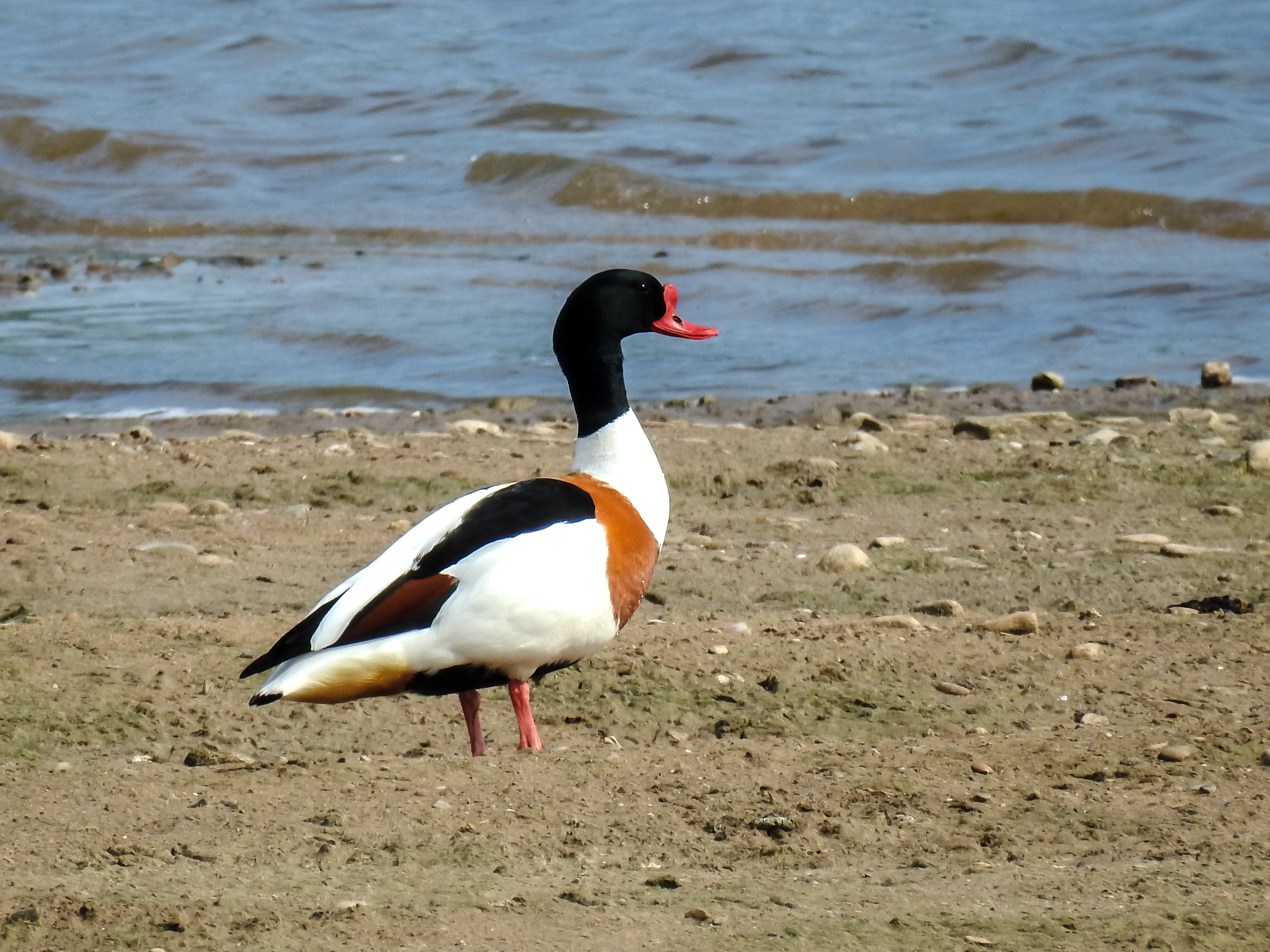
Male

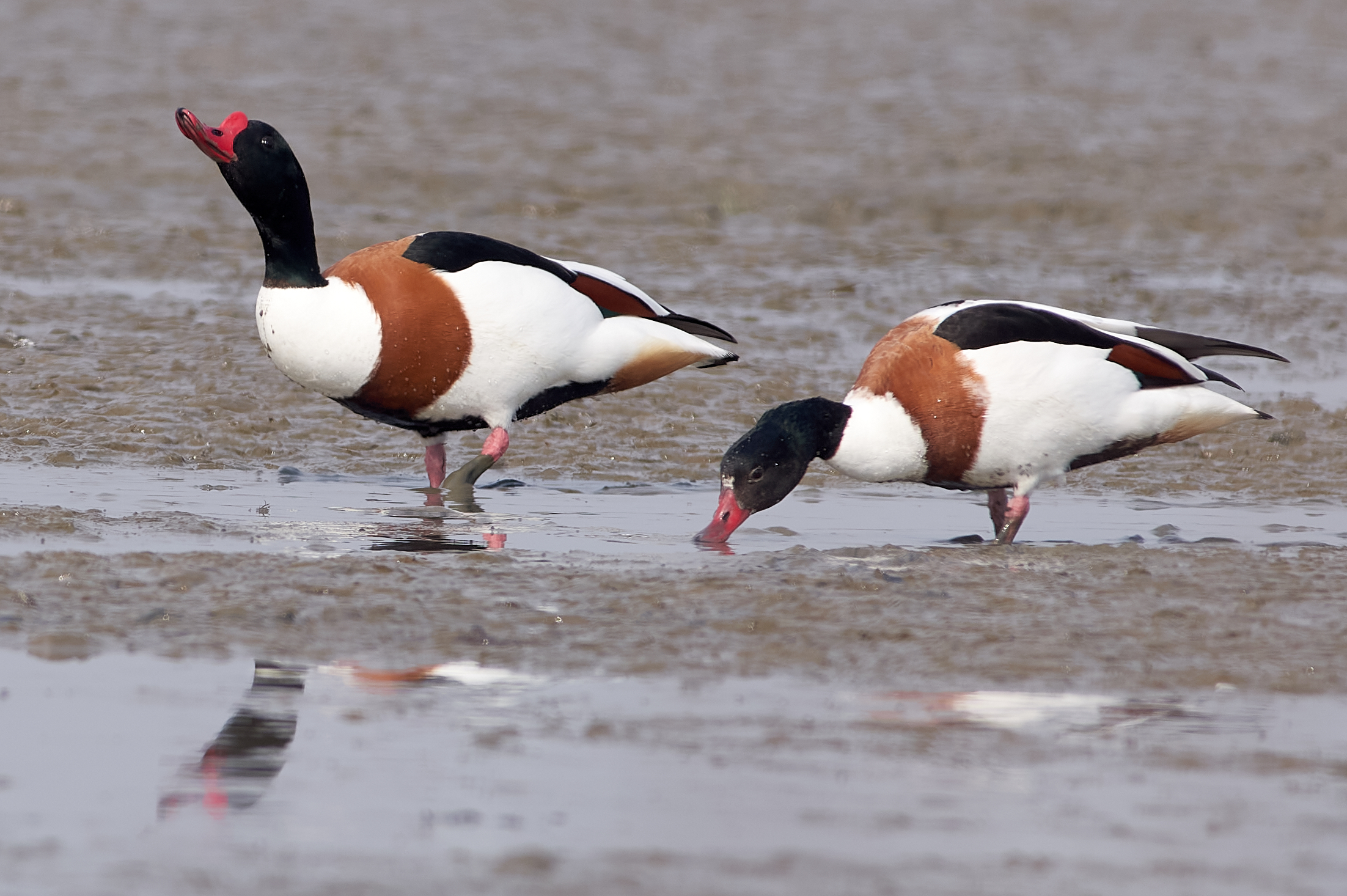
Common shelduck, male and female together on the island of Amrum, Germany

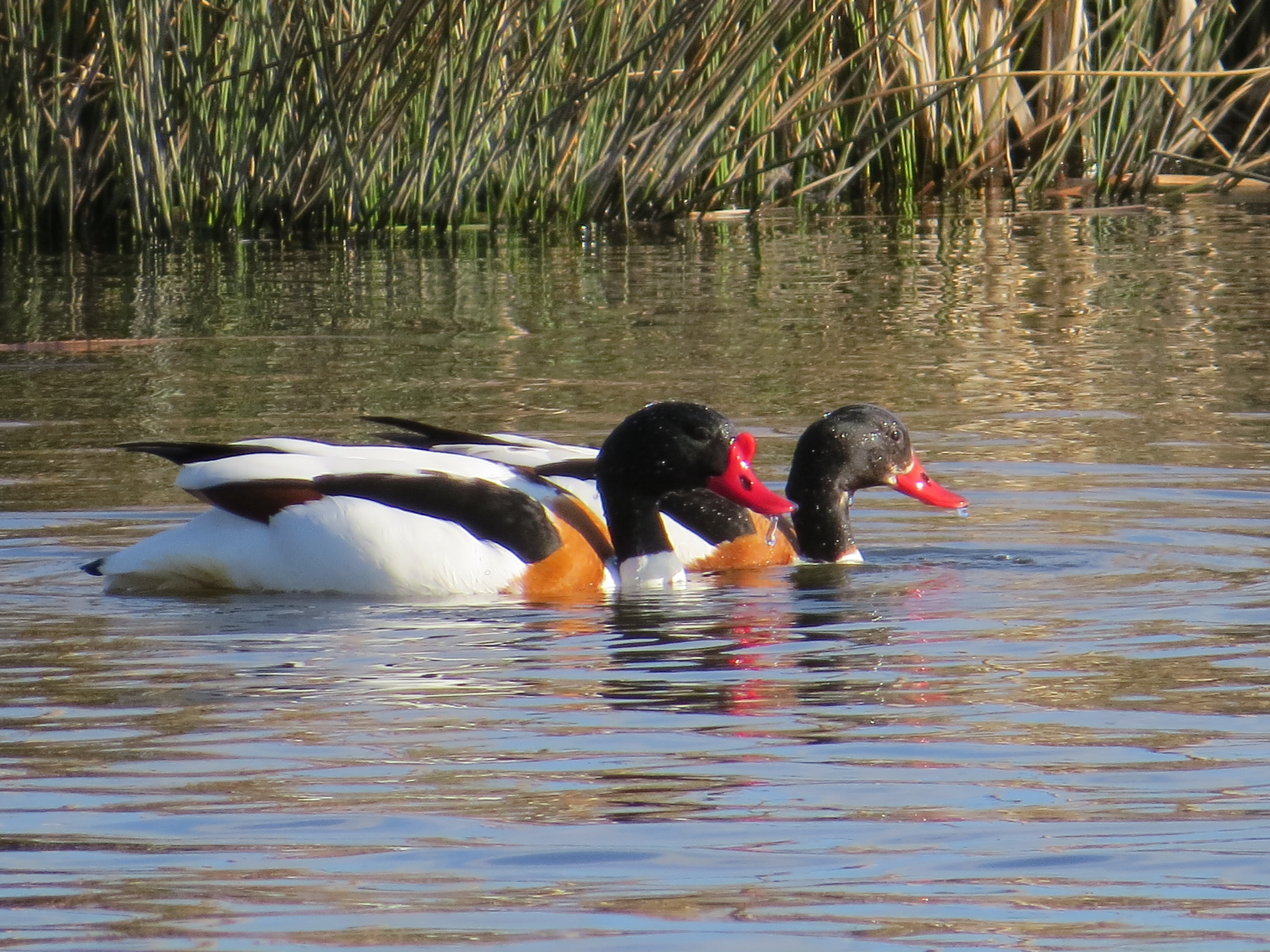
Pair swimming; the difference in bill shape can be seen

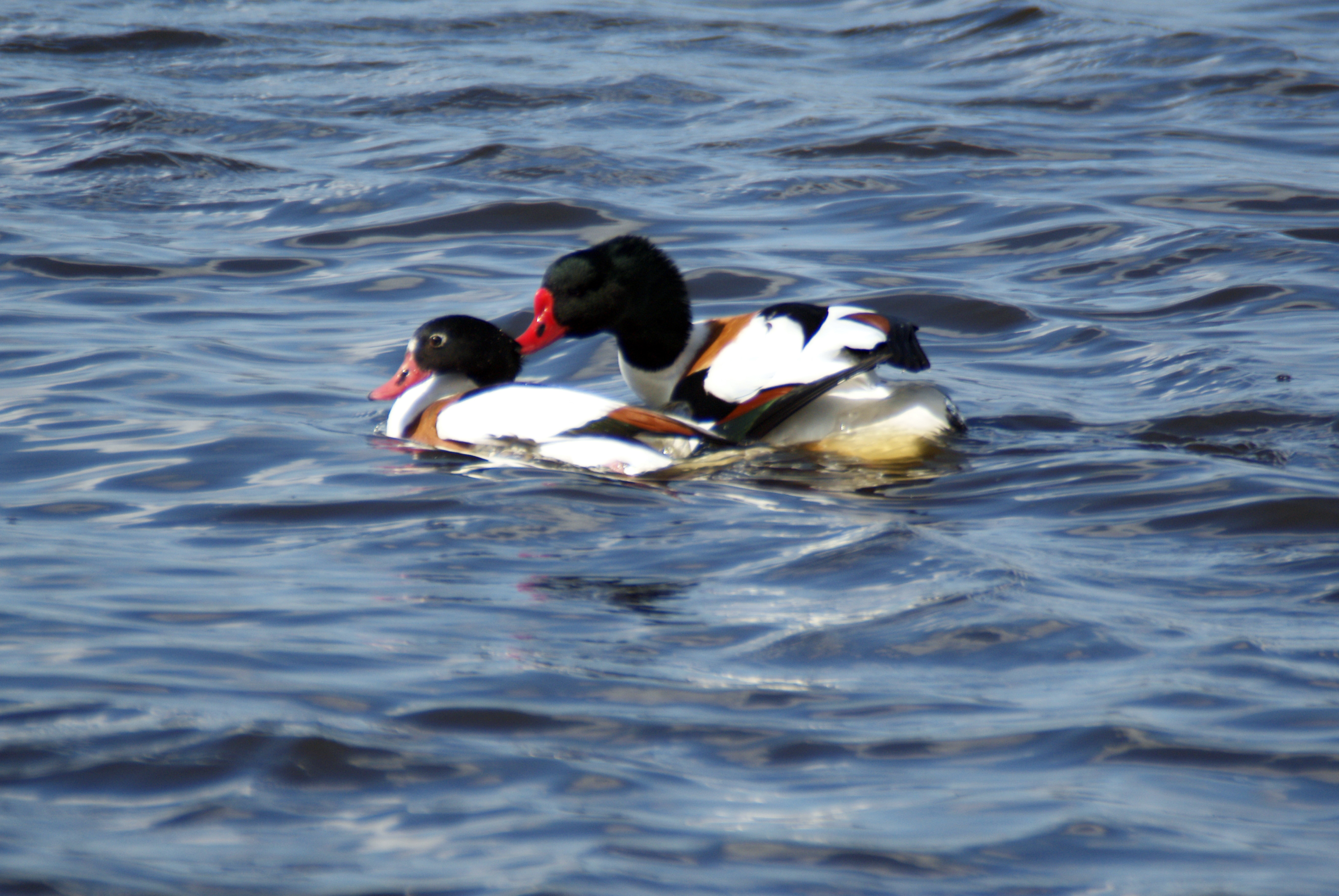
Adults mating in Lancashire (UK) (male right), note size difference

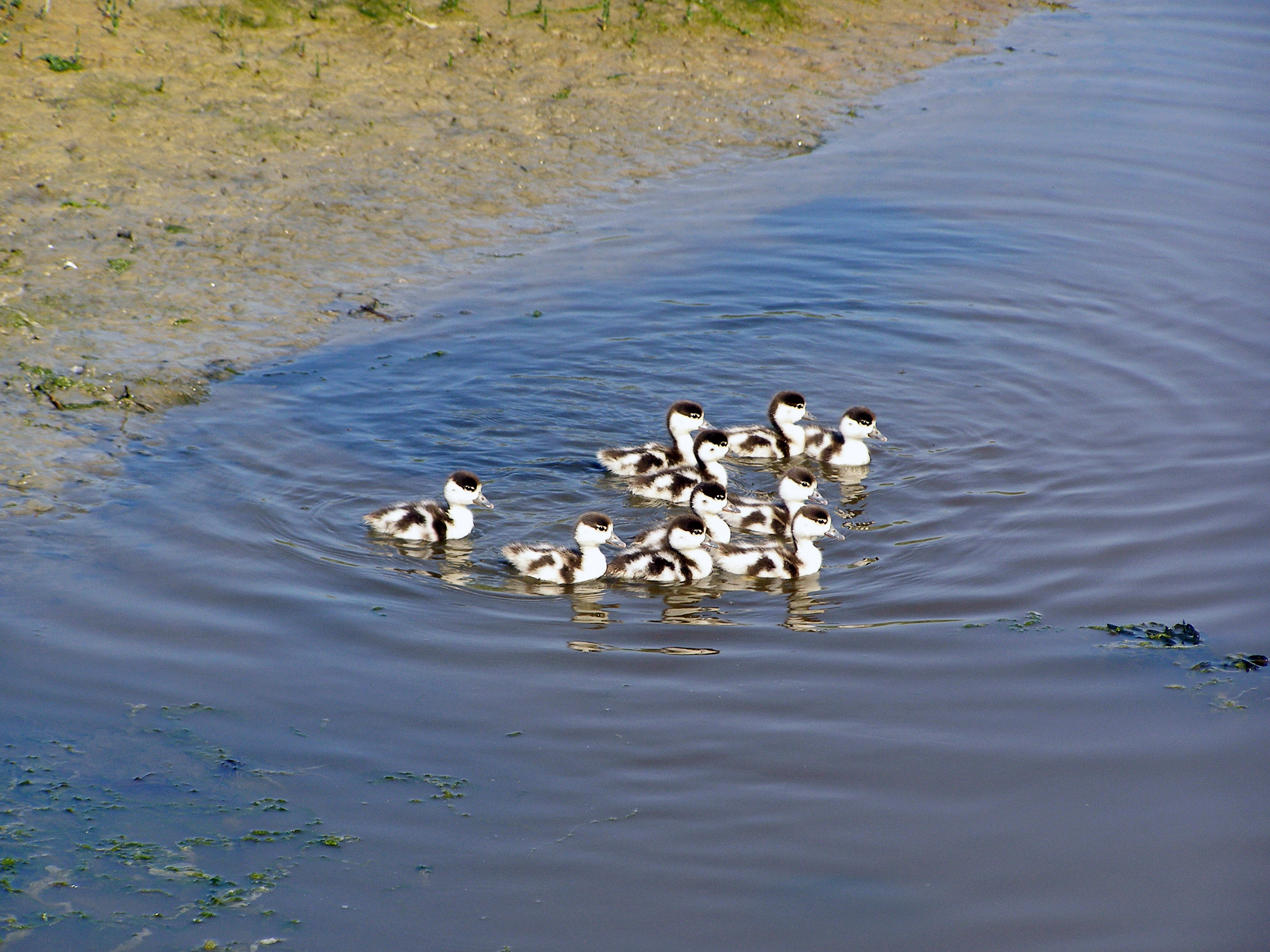
Ducklings on Borkum (Germany)

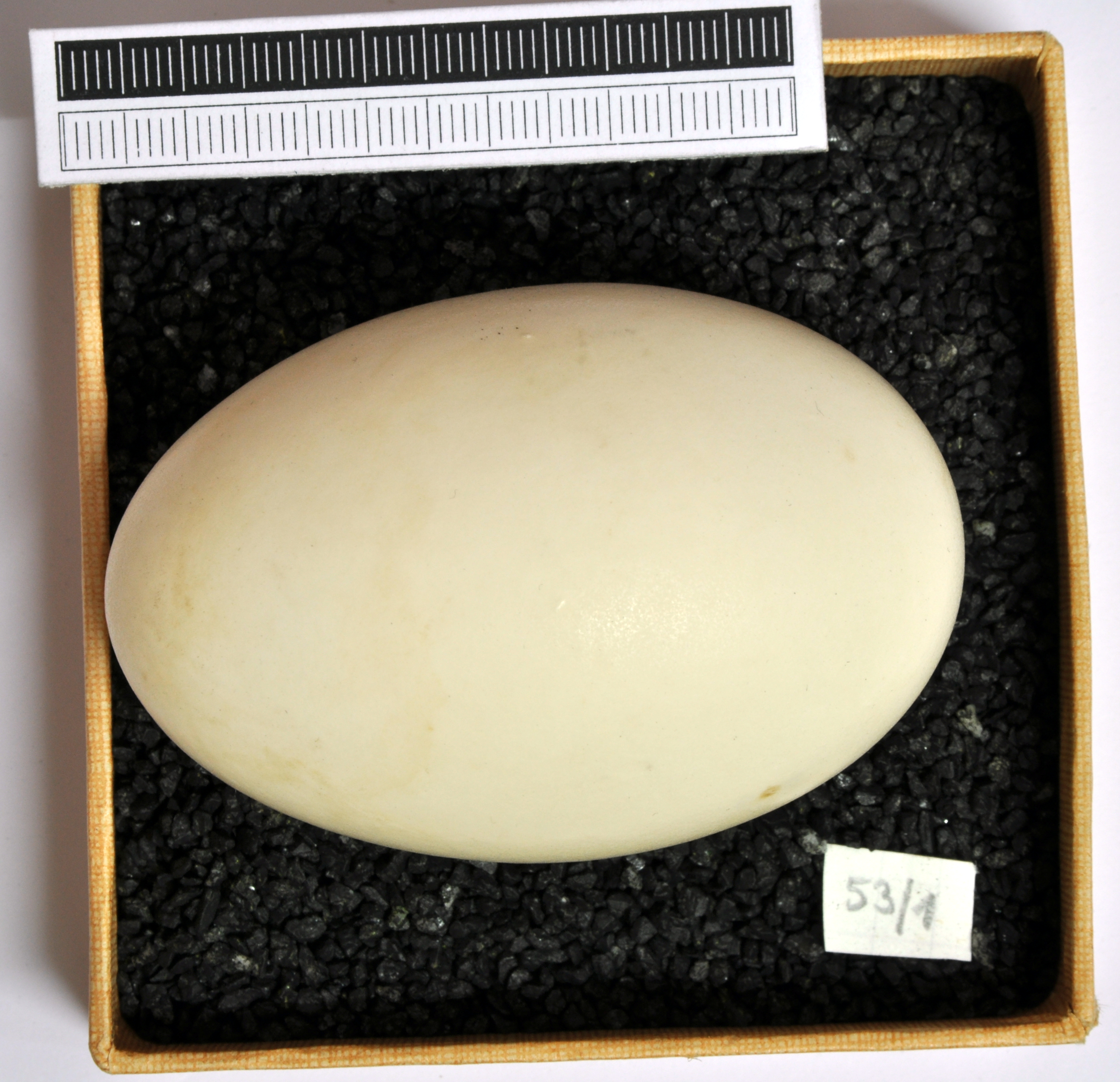
Egg, Collection Museum Wiesbaden

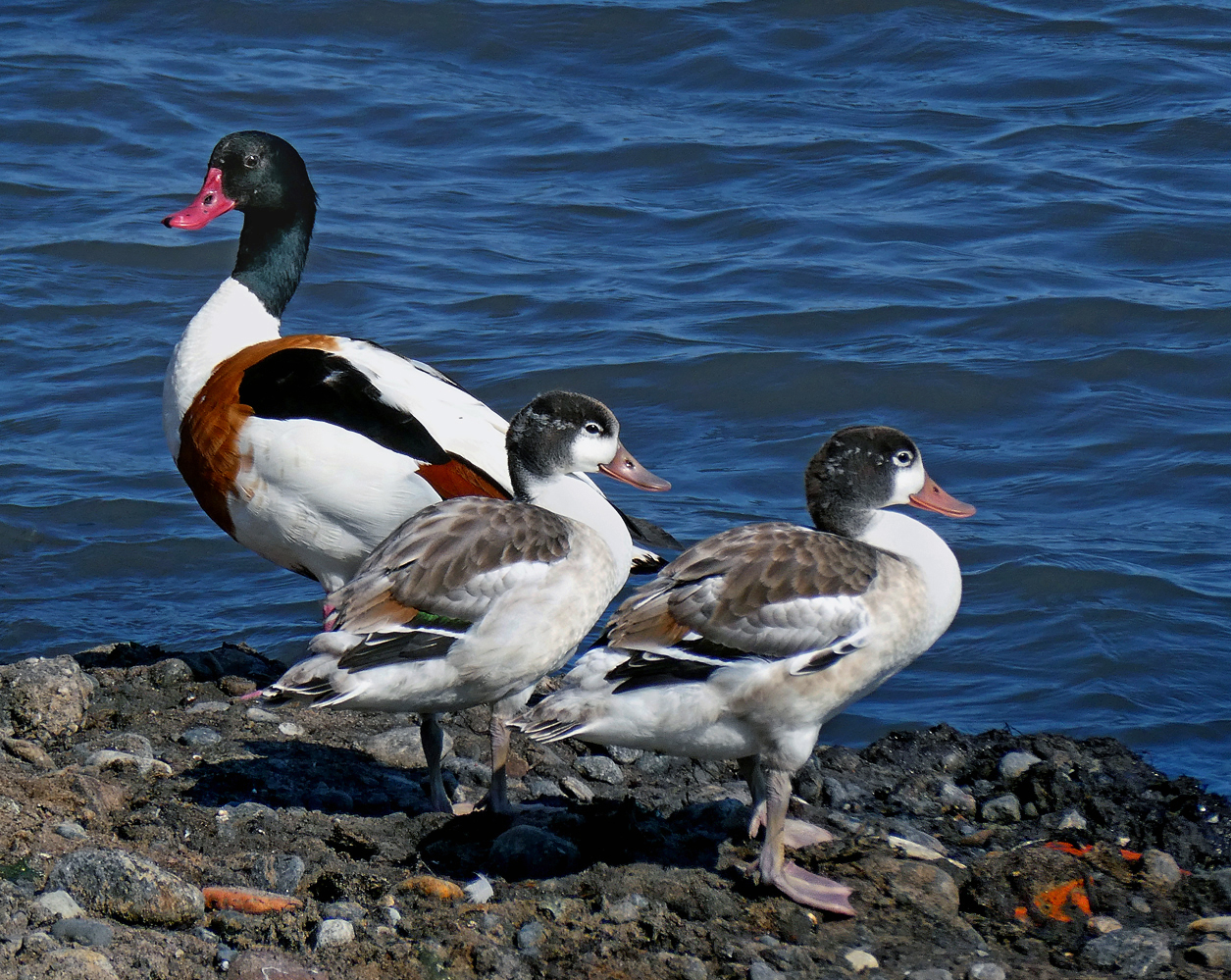
Female and two half-grown ducklings.

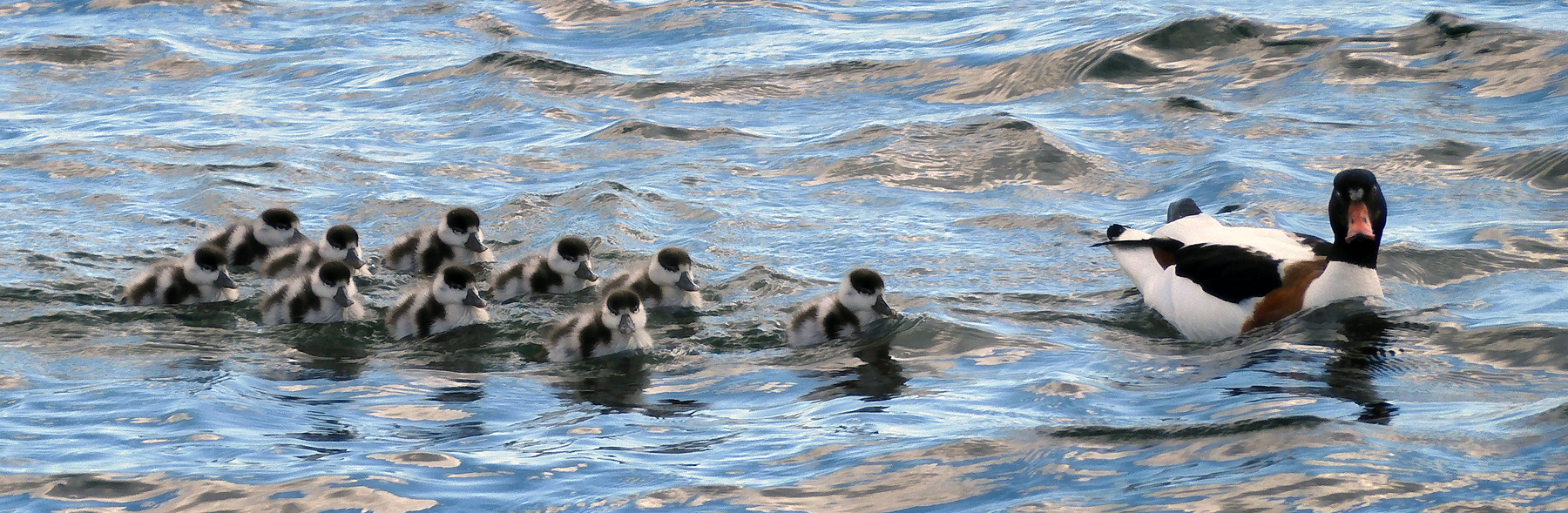
Female with one week old ducklings.

Common Shelduck
