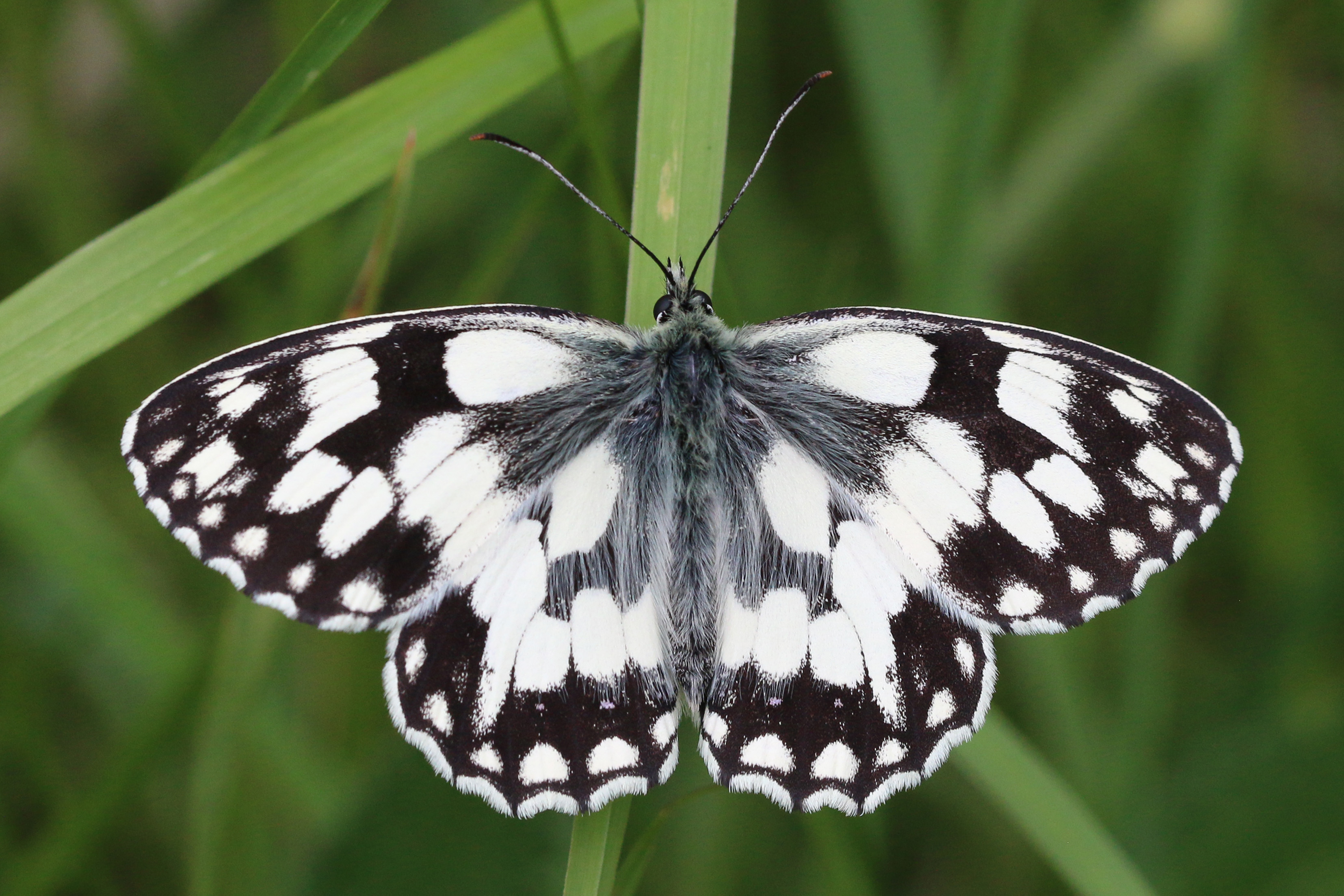
- Male, upperside Whitecross Green Wood, Oxfordshire, England
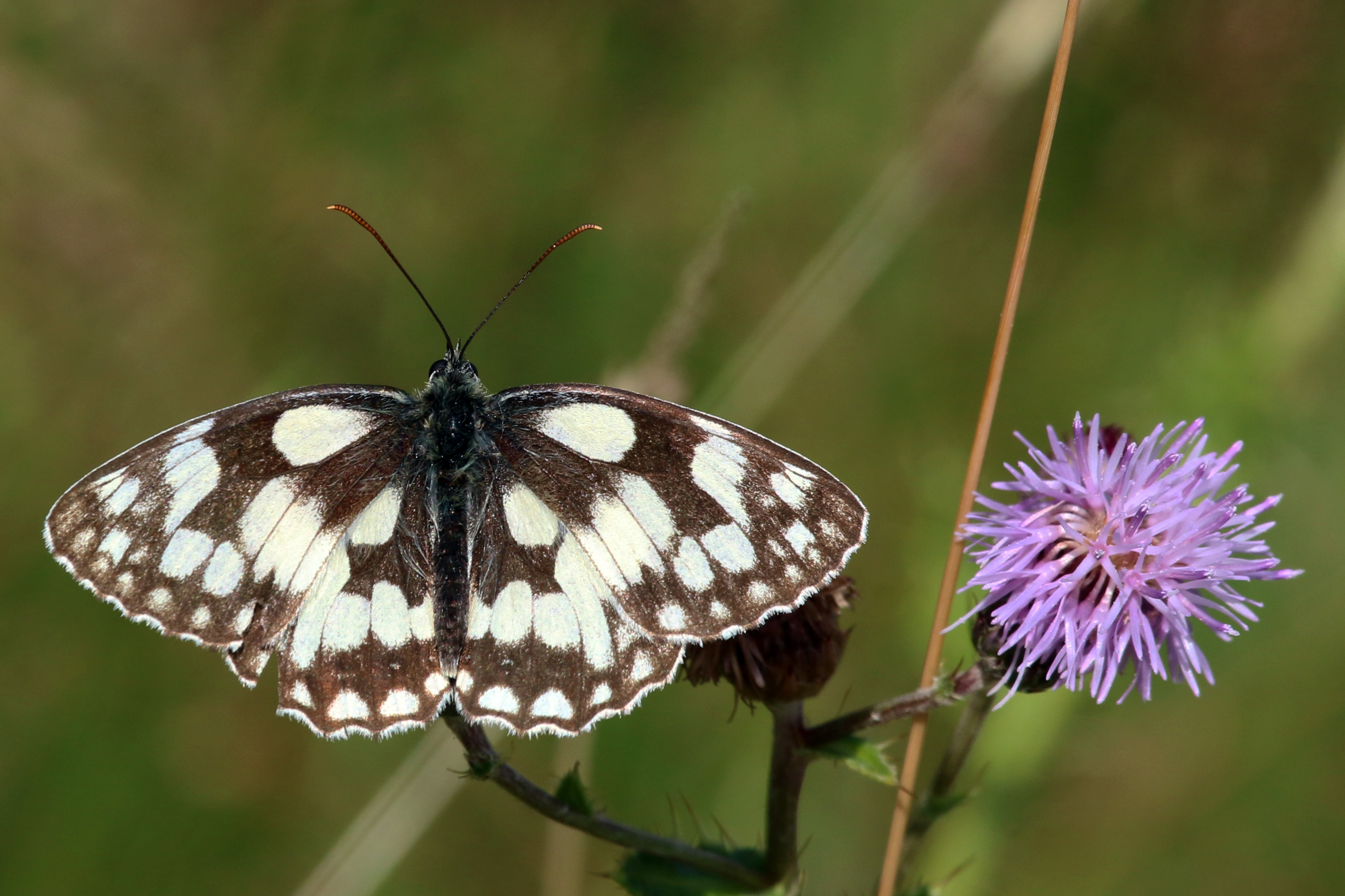
- female, upperside

Scientific classification
- Kingdom: Animalia
- Phylum: Arthropoda
- Clade: Pancrustacea
- Class: Insecta
- Order: Lepidoptera
- Family: Nymphalidae
- Genus: Melanargia
- Species: M. galathea

Binomial name
- Melanargia galathea (Linnaeus, 1758)

Synonyms
- List: Papilio galathea Linnaeus, 1758; Melanargia albibasa Lempke 1957; Melanargia annae Kesseler 1945; Melanargia brunneocosta Lempke 1957; Melanargia brunissime Perrier 1935; Melanargia caeca Lempke 1957; Melanargia carolina Weber 1964; Melanargia caronae Gallay 1947; Melanargia craskei Tubbs 1978; Melanargia dissiuncta Gussitsch 1917; Melanargia emma Rocci 1930; Agapetes essonsakaria Verity, 1953; Melanargia grisescens Varin 1948; Melanargia hades Reiss 1961; Melanargia laetepicta Stauder 1922; Melanargia lepigrei Betz 1948; Agapetes leucogonia Collier, 1952; Agapetes macronereus Verity, 1957; Agapetes macrosciritis Verity, 1953; Melanargia magnifica Stauder 1913; Agapetes microsciritis Verity, 1953; Satyrus nereine Verity, 1935; Melanargia nigrescens Varin 1948; Satyrus nigrionereus Verity, 1935; Melanargia pedemontii Rocci 1930; Agapetes pedenereus Verity, 1953; Agapetes pedenereine Verity, 1953; Melanargia planorum Rocci 1930; Melanargia pura Niepelt 1914; Melanargia quadriocellata Pionneau 1937; Melanargia sibillyna Rocci 1930; Melanargia sylvia Rocci 1930; Agapetes tenebrogigas Verity, 1938; Agapetes tenebronana Verity, 1938; Melanargia valentini Williams 1951; Melanargia vitrimontis Kesseler 1945

= Melanargia galathea =

Marbled white

Species of butterfly

Melanargia galathea, the marbled white, is a medium-sized butterfly in the family Nymphalidae. The marbled white was described in 1666 by C Merrett, and in 1695 James Petiver found a specimen in a wood near Hampstead and called it Papilio leucomelanus, our half-Mourner, to distinguish it from the Bath White, which Vernon (1702) had called the half-Mourner. It was also known as The Marmoris by Benjamin Wilkes and The Marmoress by Moses Harris. The butterfly was, also described in 1758, by the Swedish biologist and physician, Carl Linnaeus who formalised binomial nomenclature. Despite its common name and appearance, this butterfly is one of the "browns", of the subfamily Satyrinae.

This species can be found across most of Europe, southern Russia, Asia Minor and Iran. It is found in forest clearings and edges, meadows and steppe where it occurs up to 1,500–1,700 metres (4,900–5,600 ft) above sea level. The caterpillars feed on various grasses.

== Description ==
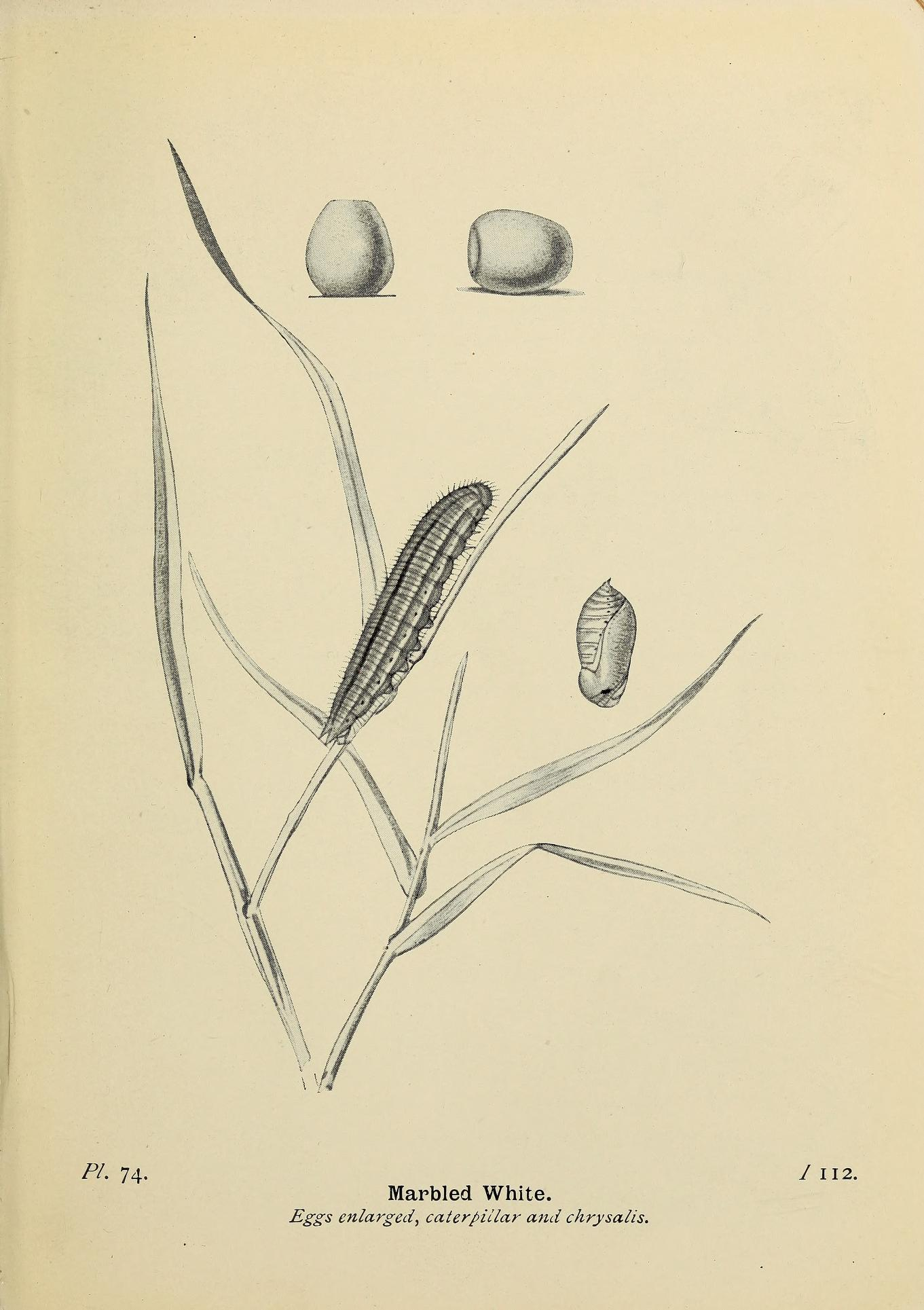
Illustration of egg, larva and pupa

Melanargia galathea has a wingspan of 46–56 millimetres (1.8–2.2 in). In these medium-sized butterflies the upper side of the wings is decorated with white and gray-black or dark brown markings, but it is always gray-black or dark brown checkered in the basal and distal areas. The underside is similar to the upper side but the drawings is light gray or light brown. On the underside of the hindwings is present a row of gray eye spots. The males and the females are quite similar, except that some females may have a yellowish nuance on the underside of the wings. Seitz - M. galathea. In the otherwise black cell of both wing an oval white spot which is not divided by a transverse bar. On the hindwing above the ocelli are quite invisible or shine through very faintly from the underside. On a good site, in warm, sunny weather, thousands can be seen gently fluttering amongst the grass heads.

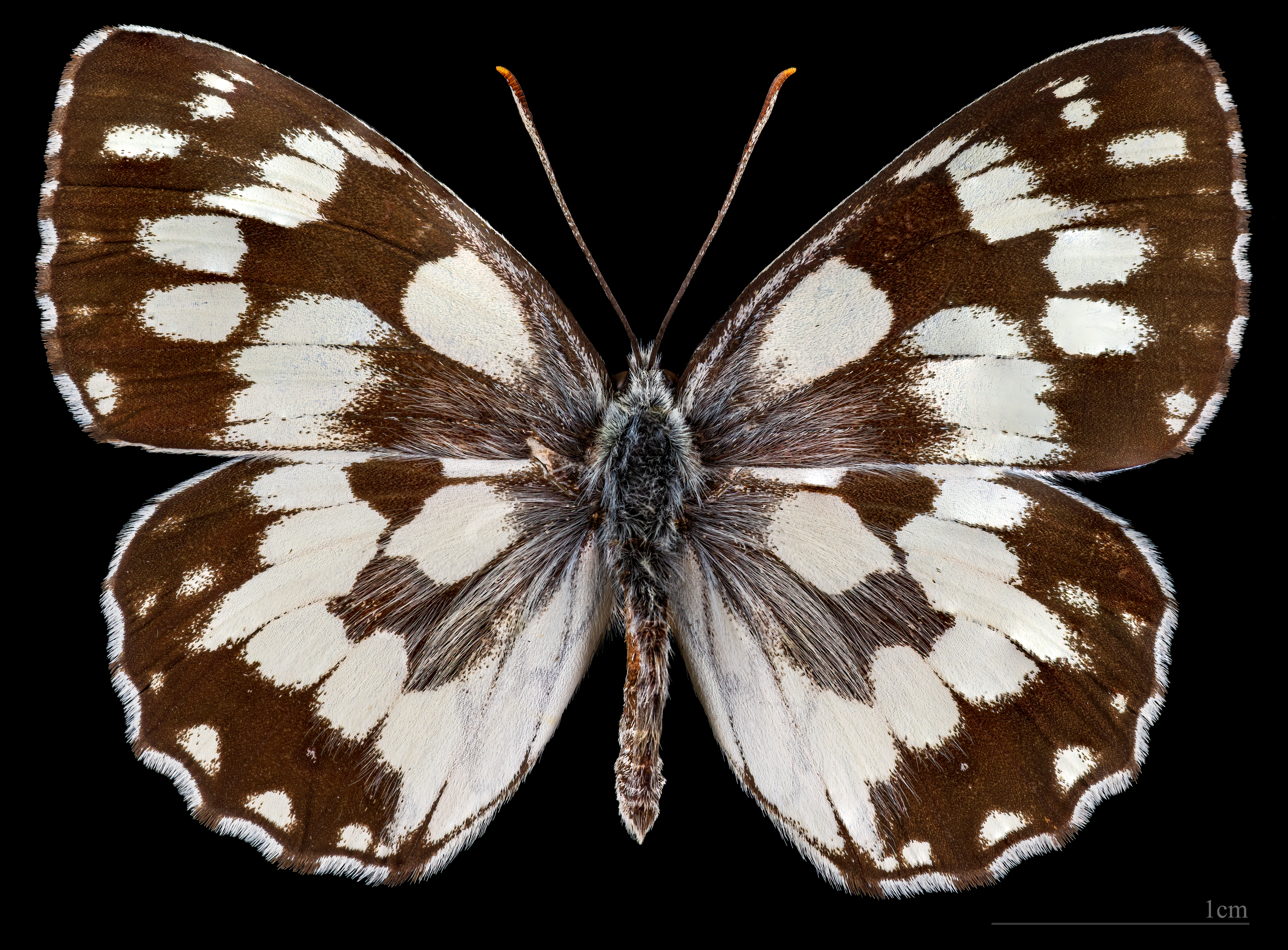
♂

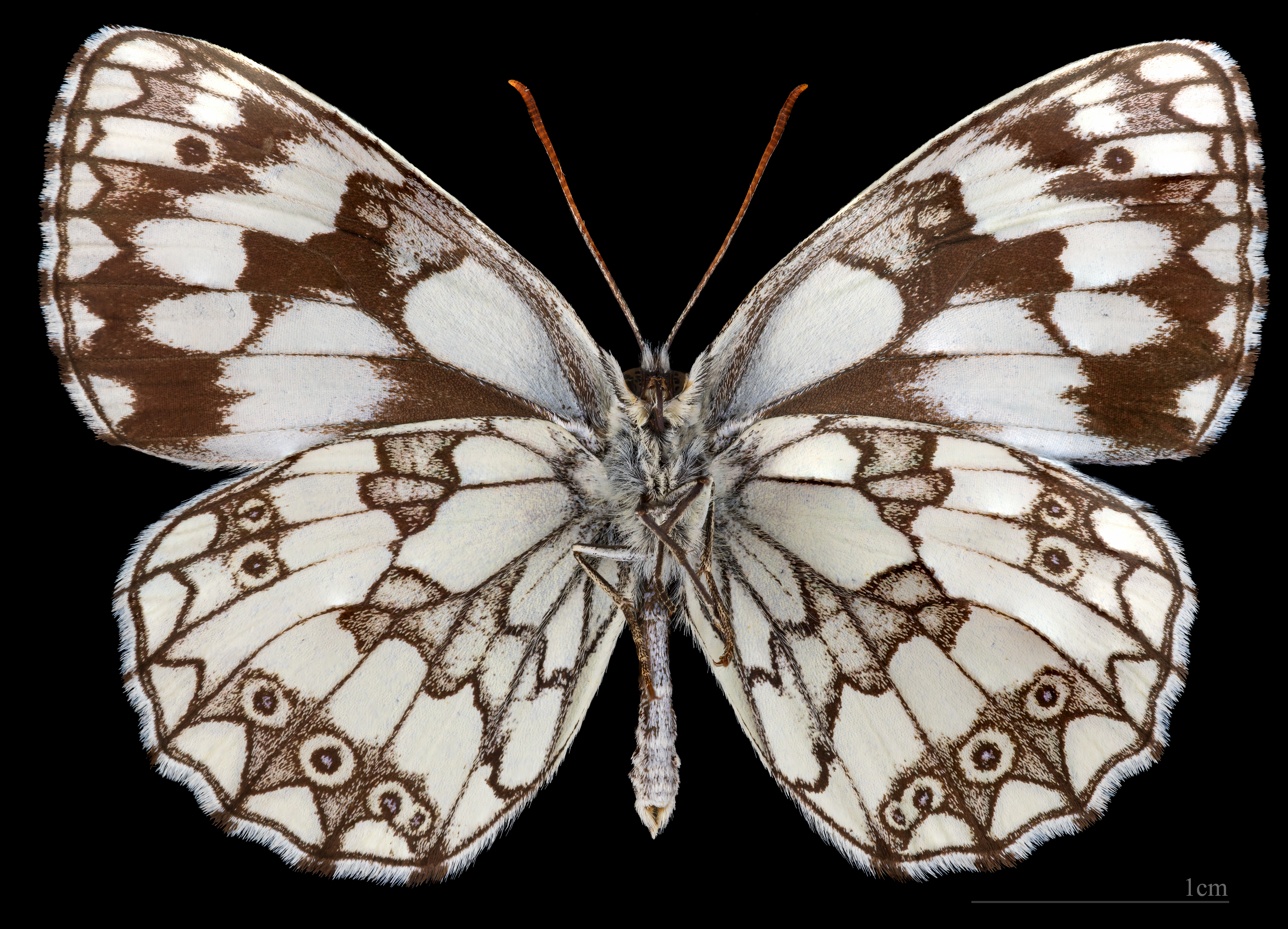
♂ △

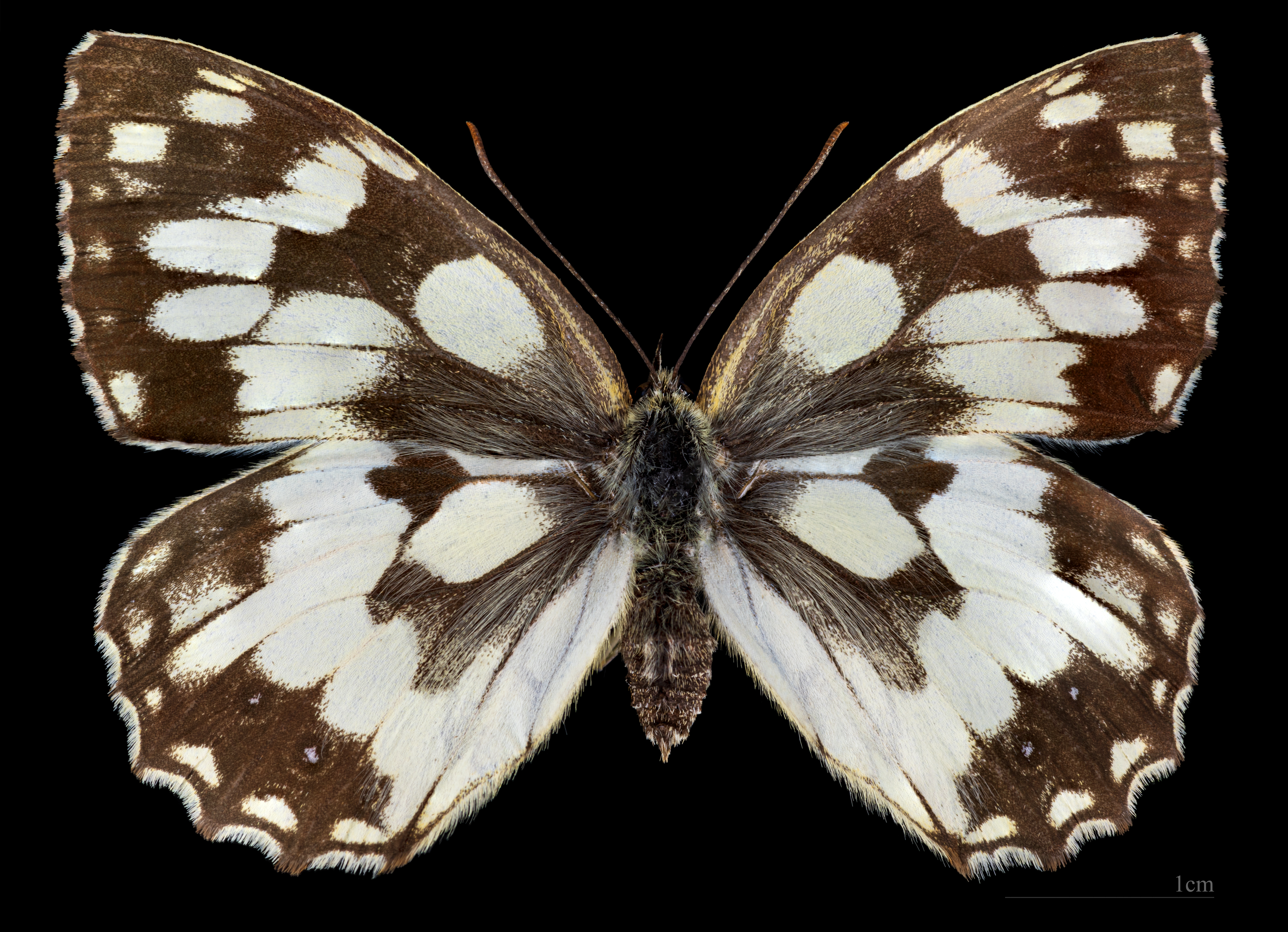
♀

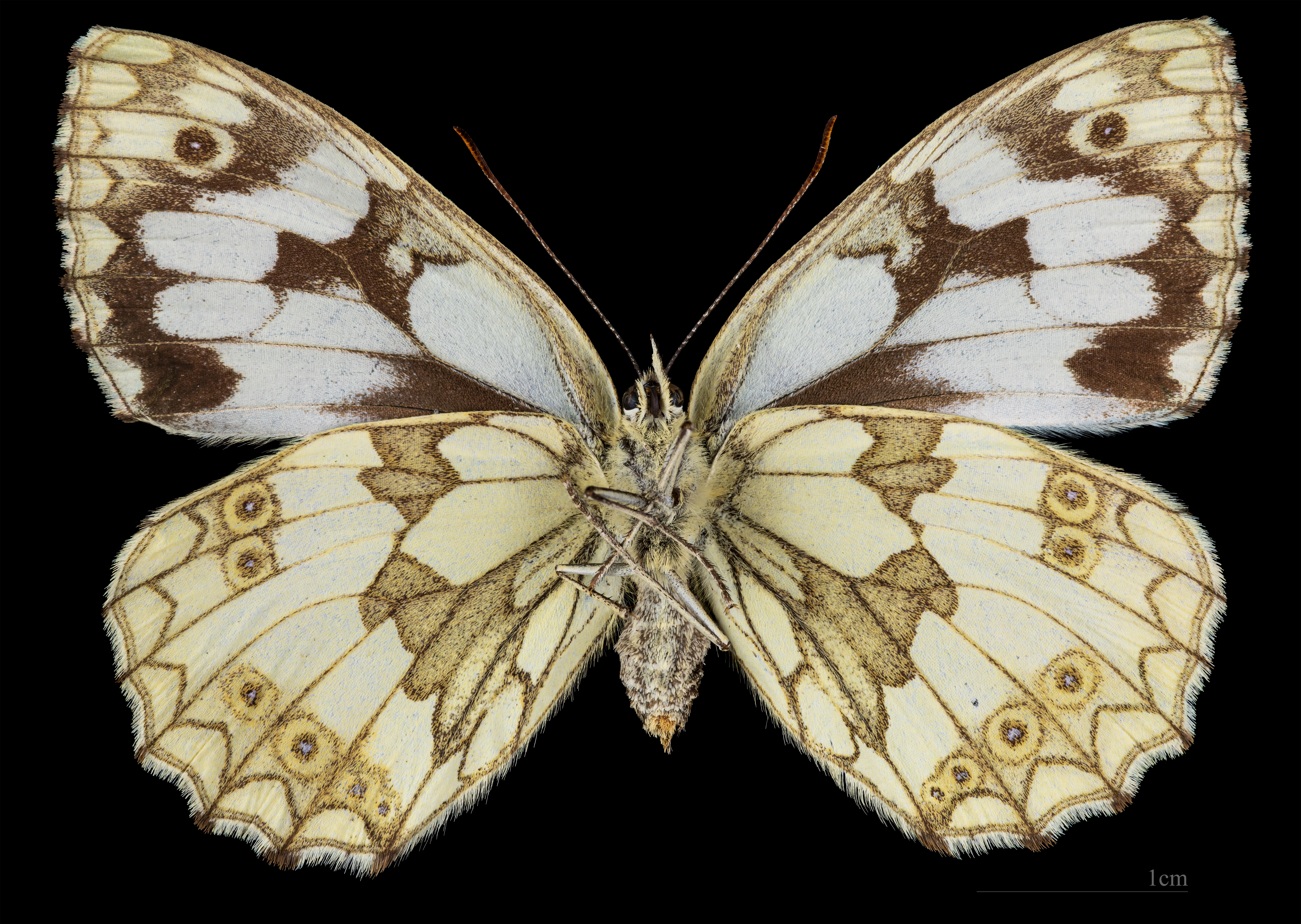
♀ △

== Life cycle ==
Ova

Eggs are laid on the wing, or from brief perches on various grass stems, and are just sprinkled among the grass stems. These include Timothy (Phleum pratense), annual meadow grass (Poa annua), rough meadow-grass (P. trivalis), red fescue (Festuca rubra), upright brome (Bromus erectus), tor-grass (Brachypodium pinnatum), common bent (Agrostis capillaris), couch grasses (Elymus syn. Elytrigia), soft-grasses (Holcus species), cocksfoot grasses (Dactylis species), wheat (Triticum species) and wheatgrass (Agropyron species).

Larvae

Upon hatching, the larvae immediately enter hibernation and feed in the following spring when the fresh growth occurs. They are a lime-green colour, with a dark green line running down the middle of their back.

Marbled White are a slow flying species so should be an easy prey for predators but because the larvae feed on grasses it was a mystery as to where toxins could come from to deter predators. The toxins are a type of pyrrolizidine alkaloid known as Iolines. Research by Miriam Rothschild and David Nash suggest that the larvae get their toxins by eating fungi which infect their normal diet of grasses, and retain the poisons to deter predators, such as birds, from eating the larvae and adults. This is the first record of a butterfly acquiring toxins from a fungus.

Pupae

Pupation takes place at ground level in a loose cocoon. Adults can be found from early June to early September.

== Subspecies ==
Subspecies include:

- Melanargia galathea galathea Europe, southern Urals
- Melanargia galathea donsa Fruhstorfer, 1916 Caucasus
- Melanargia galathea lucasi (Rambur, 1858) North Africa
- Melanargia galathea magdalenae Reichl, 1975
- Melanargia galathea procida (Herbst, 1796)
- Melanargia galathea satnia Fruhstorfer, 1917 (= njurdzhan Sheljuzhko) Caucasus Major and Minor
- Melanargia galathea tenebrosa Fruhstorfer, 1917
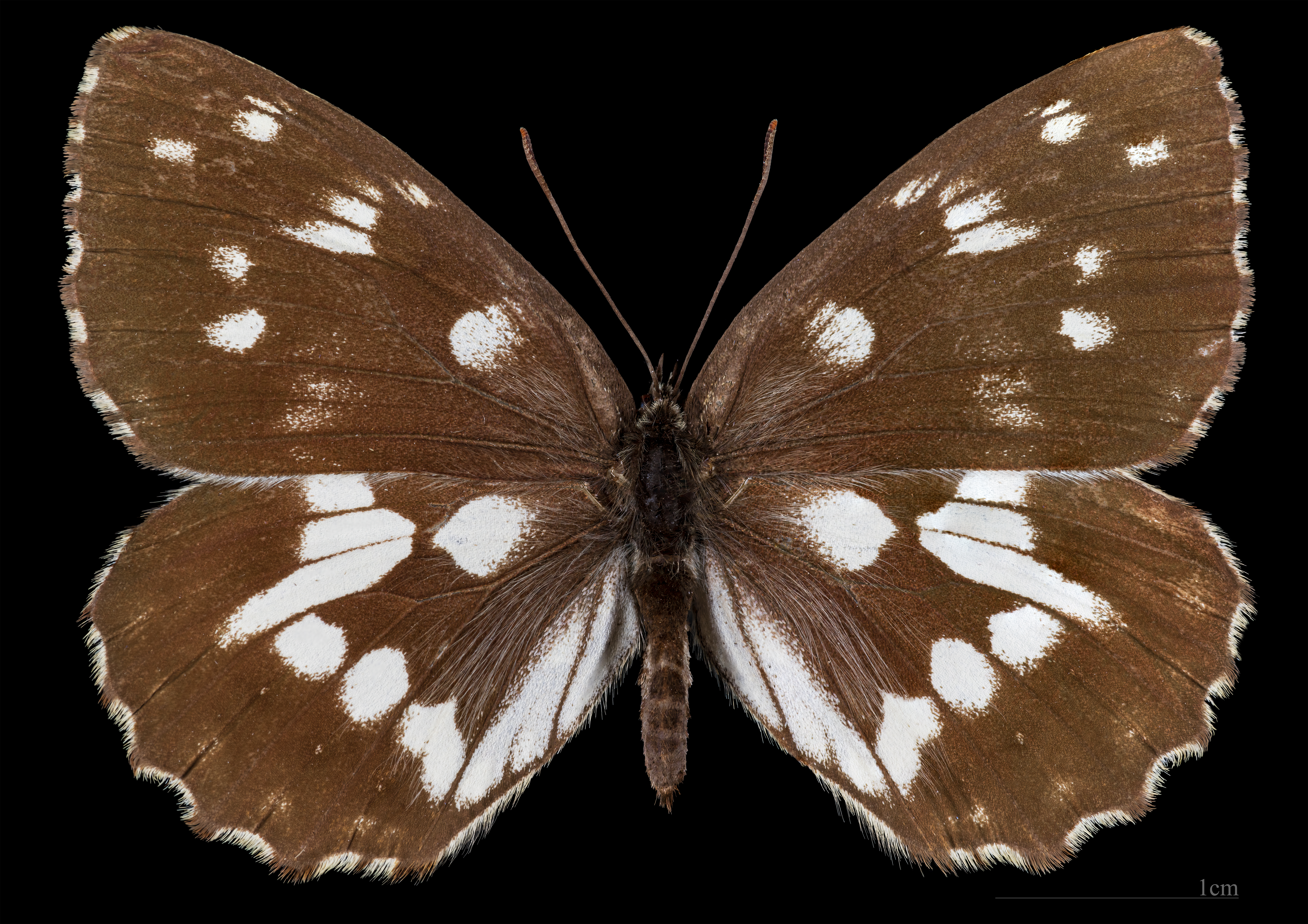
Melanargia galathea magdalenae ♀

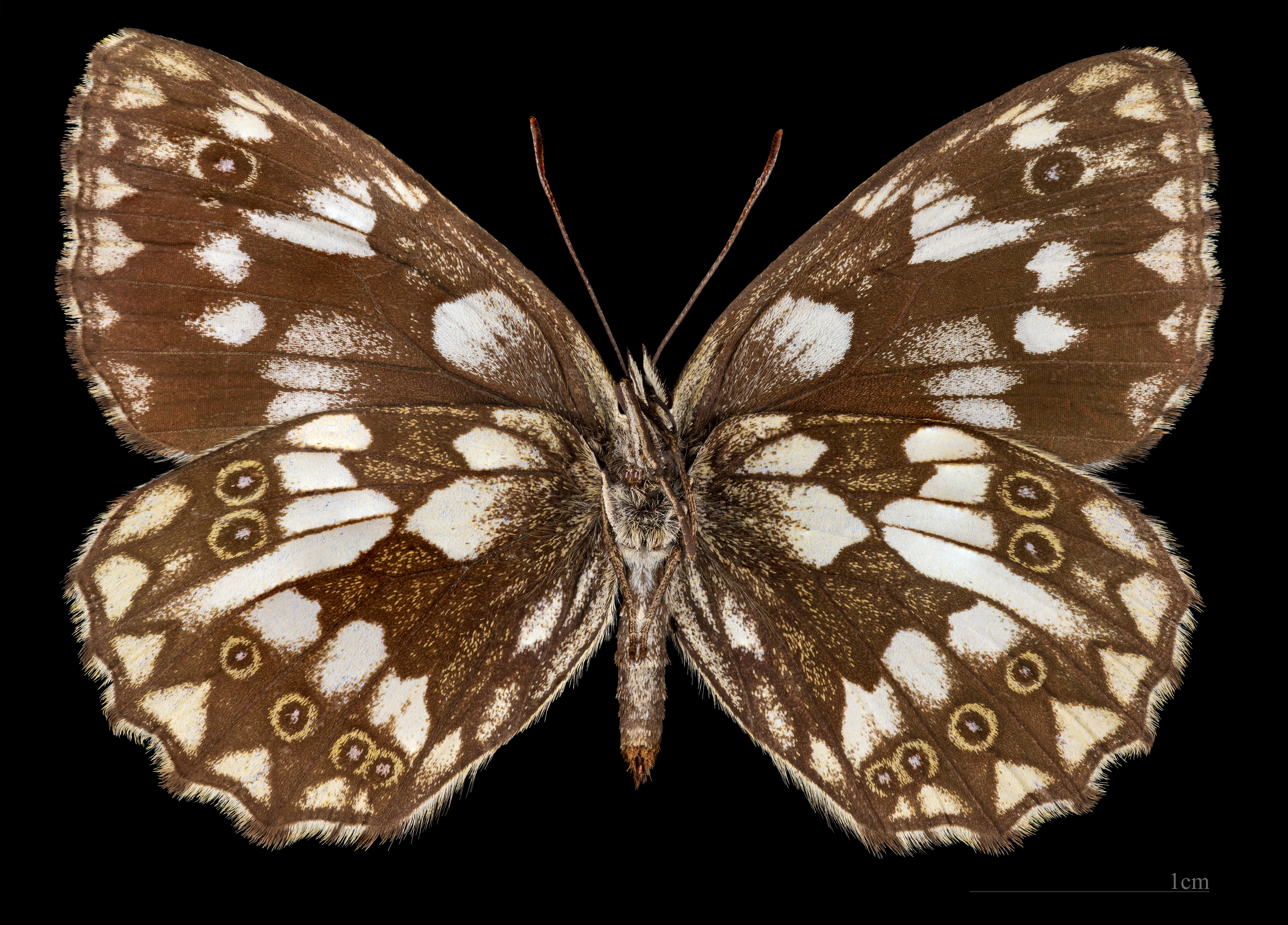
Melanargia galathea magdalenae ♀ △

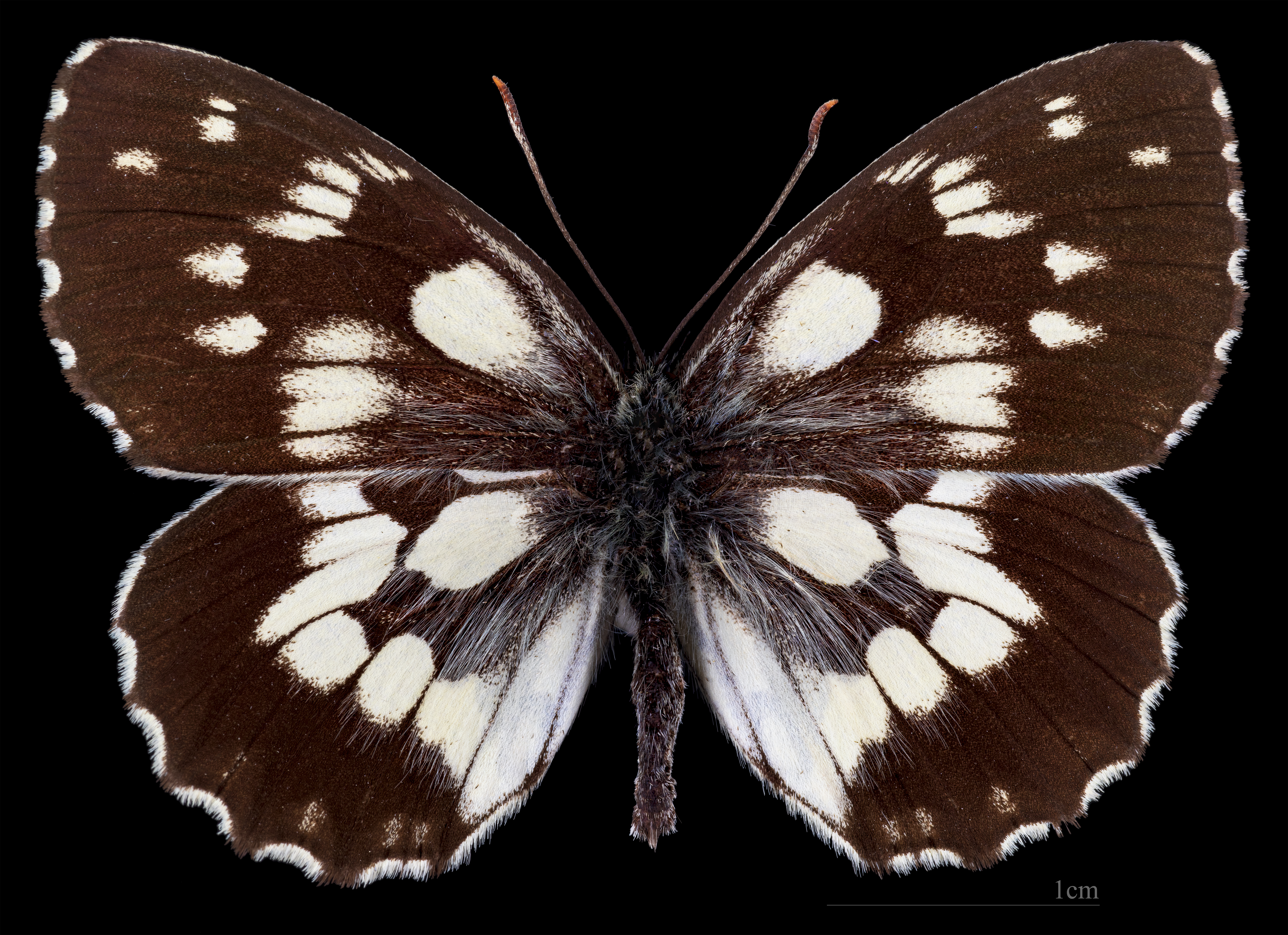
Melanargia galathea procida ♂

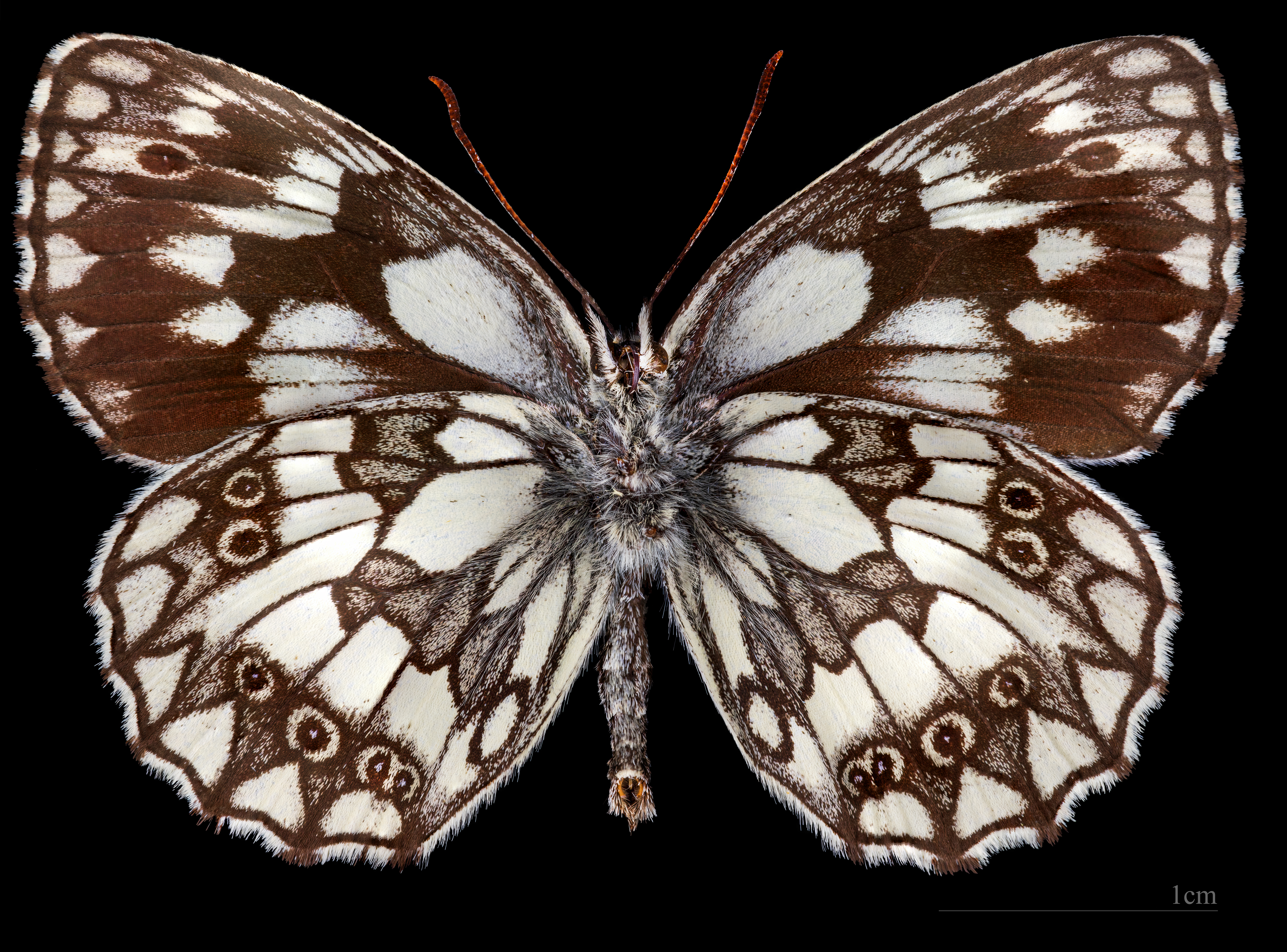
Melanargia galathea procida ♂ △
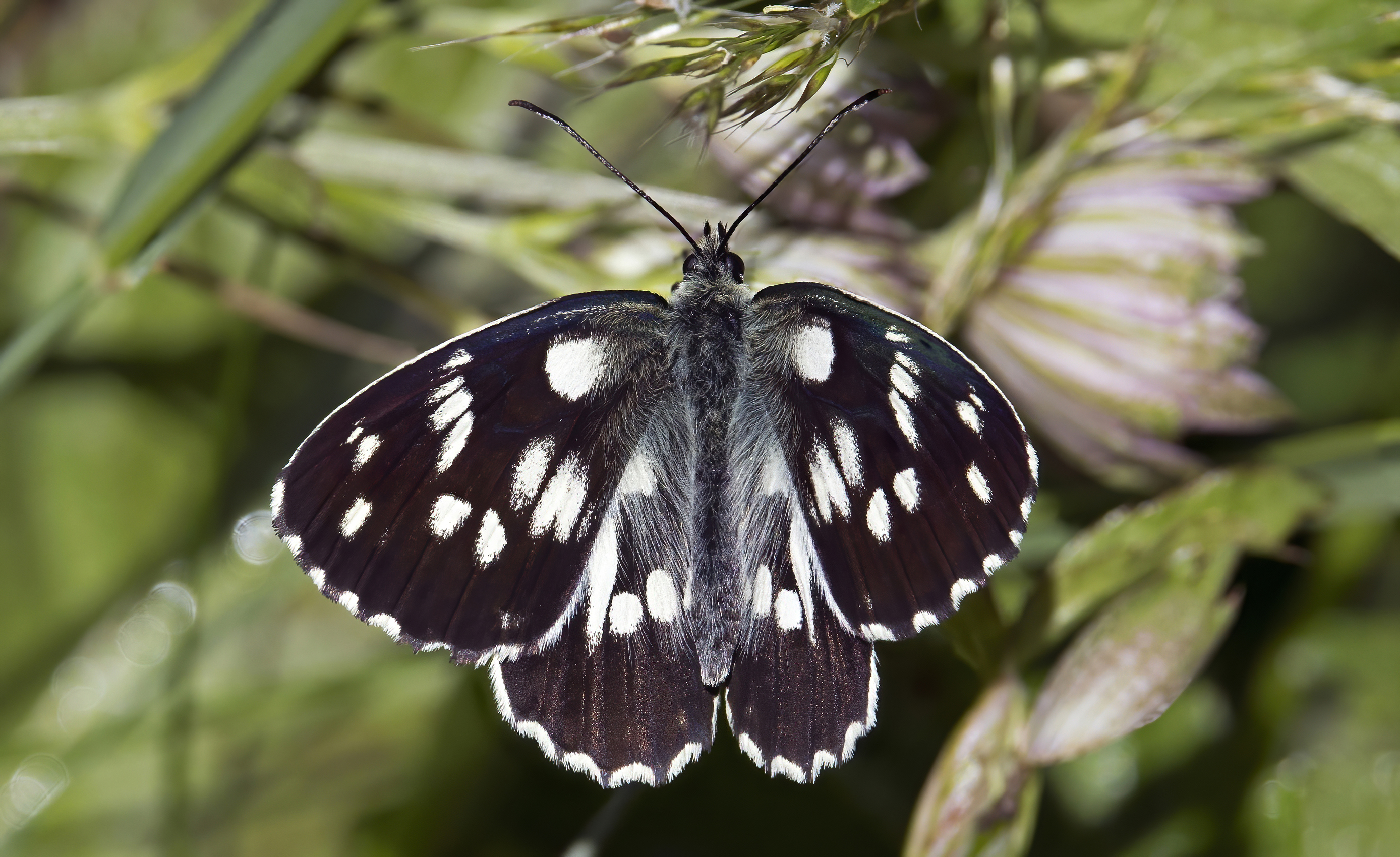
male form procida

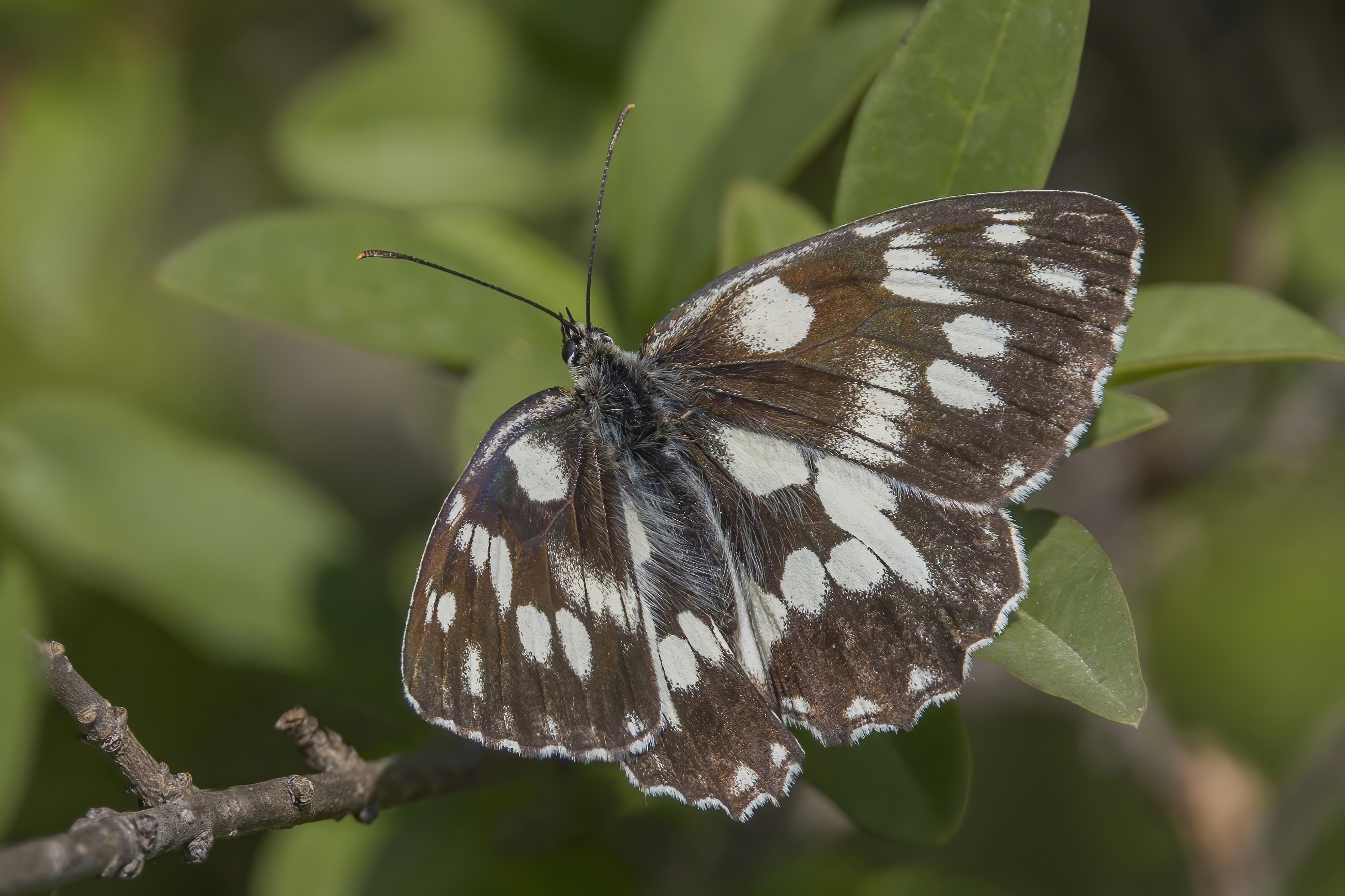
female form procida

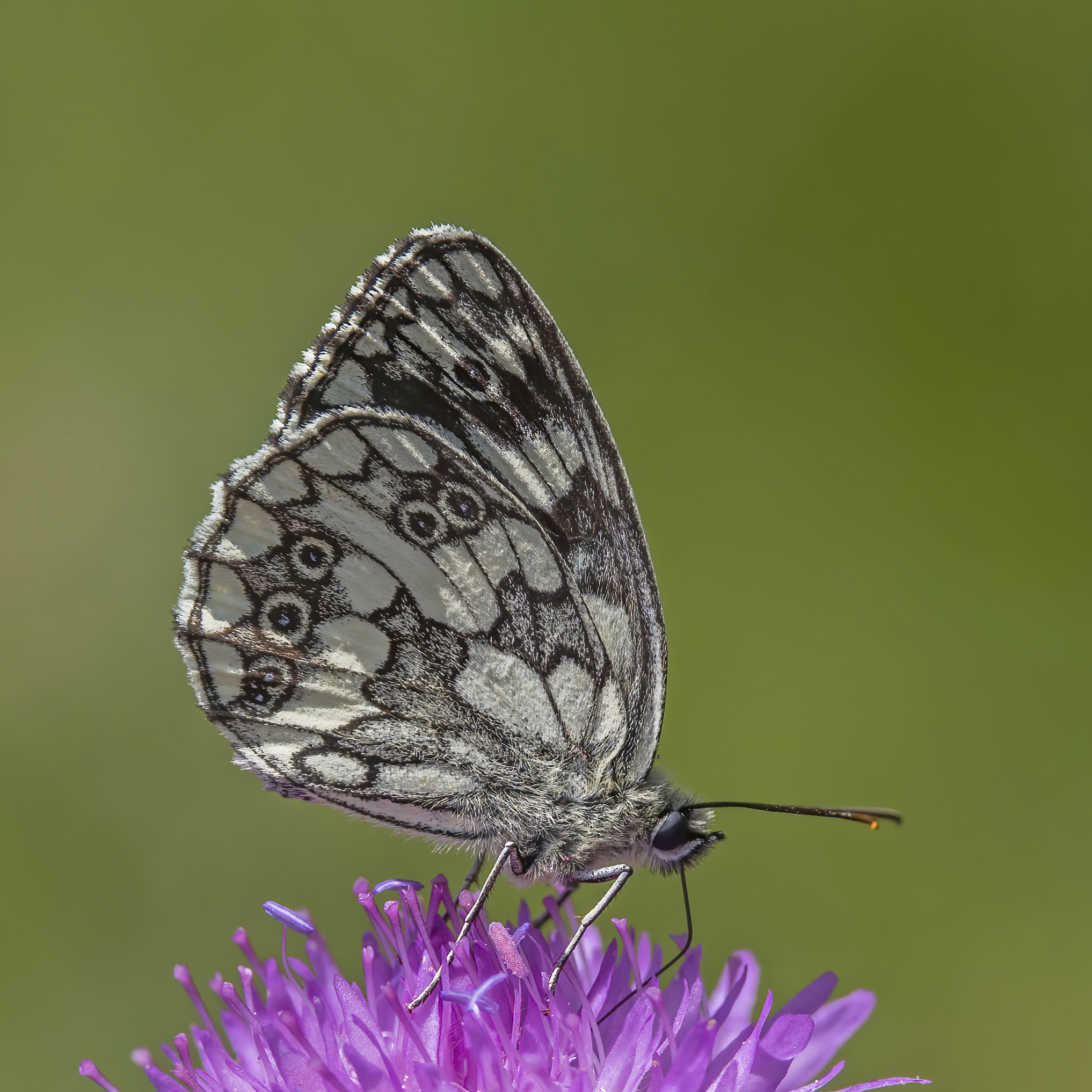
male form procida underside

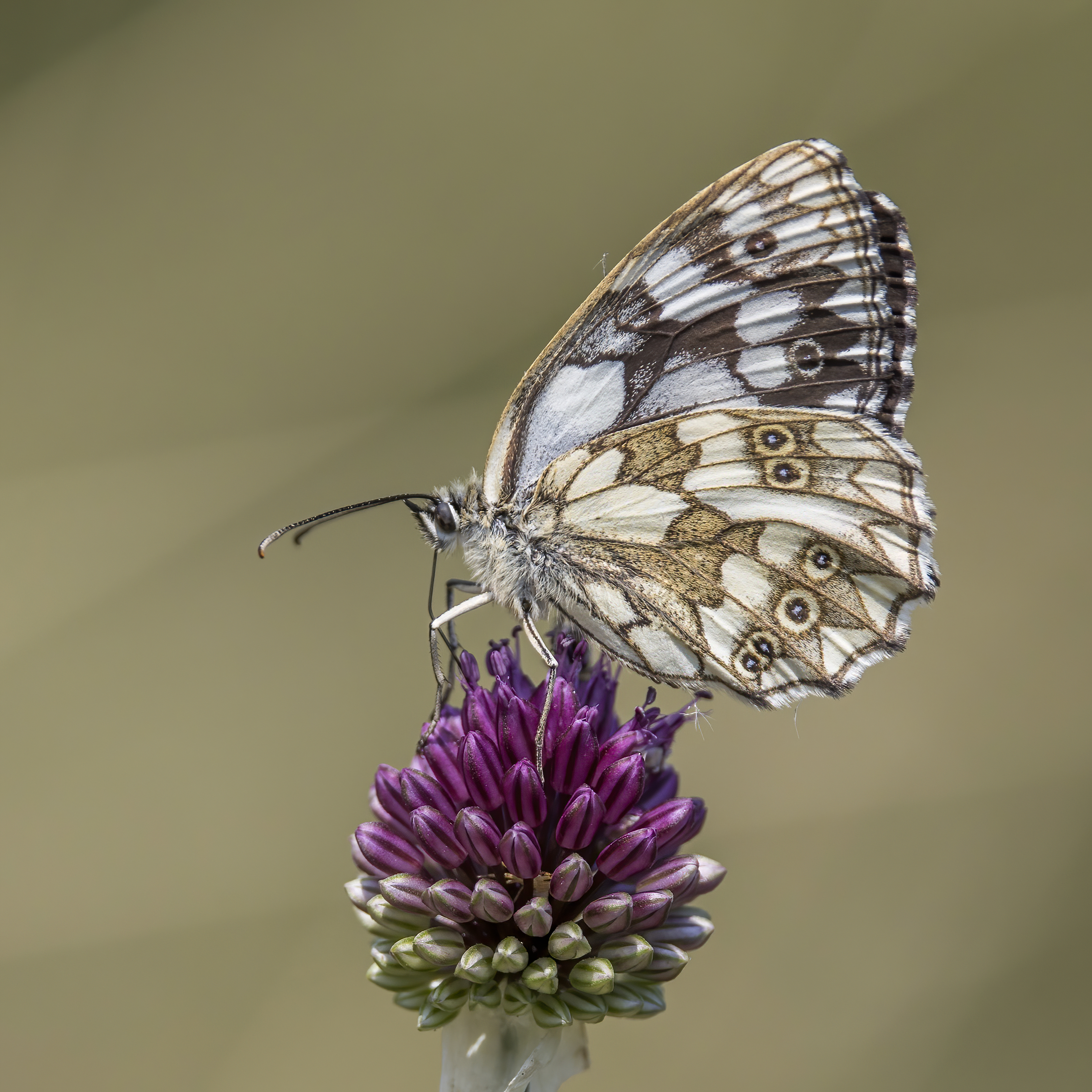
female form procida underside

== Habitat ==
It is found in forest clearings and edges, meadows and steppe where it occurs up to 1,500-1,700 m above sea level. They are a common sight in unimproved grasslands across southern Britain, particularly on the South Downs, but also extending slightly further north to places such as the Dunstable Downs, Devil's Dyke near Newmarket, Fleam Dyke, Les King Wood near the South Cambs village of Cottenham, The "Edwards" wood, Dry Drayton.

== Distribution ==
This species can be found across most of Europe, southern Russia, Asia Minor and Iran. There is an isolated population in Japan. It is not found in Ireland, North Britain, Scandinavia (except Denmark) and Portugal or Spain. The late twentieth century saw an expansion of its range in the UK.

== Similar species ==
This species is rather similar to the Iberian marbled white (Melanargia lachesis) that replaces M. galathea in Spain and southern France.

The caterpillars are about 28 millimeters long. They are green or yellow with some lighter and darker narrow longitudinal lines. The head is always light brown.

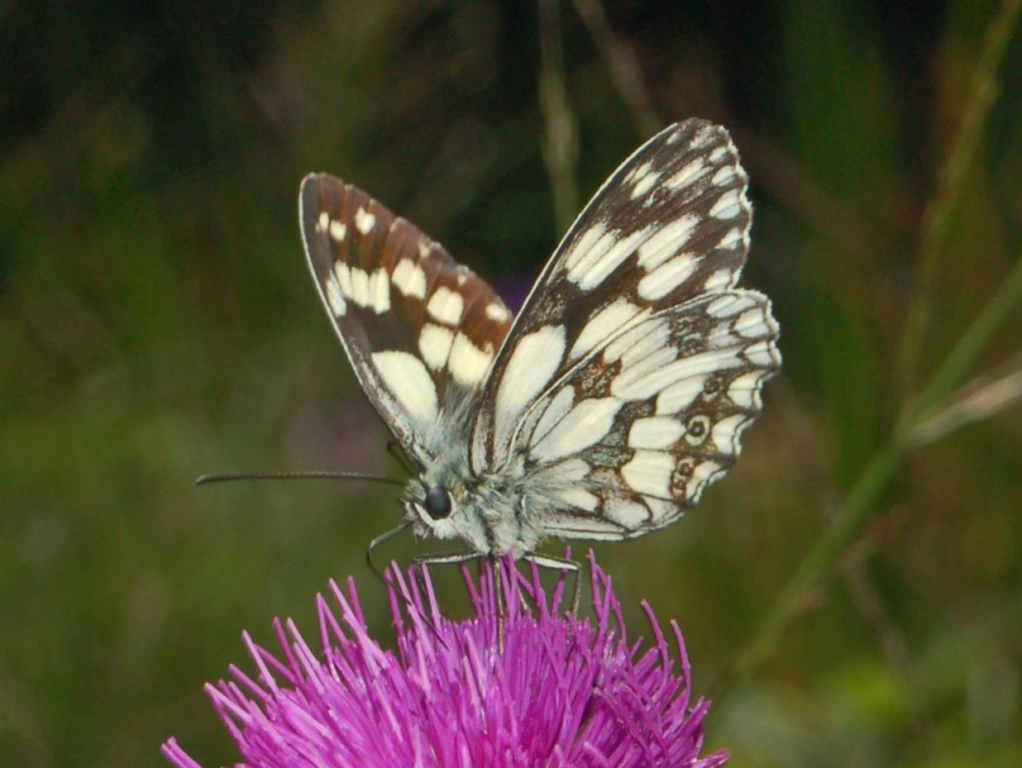

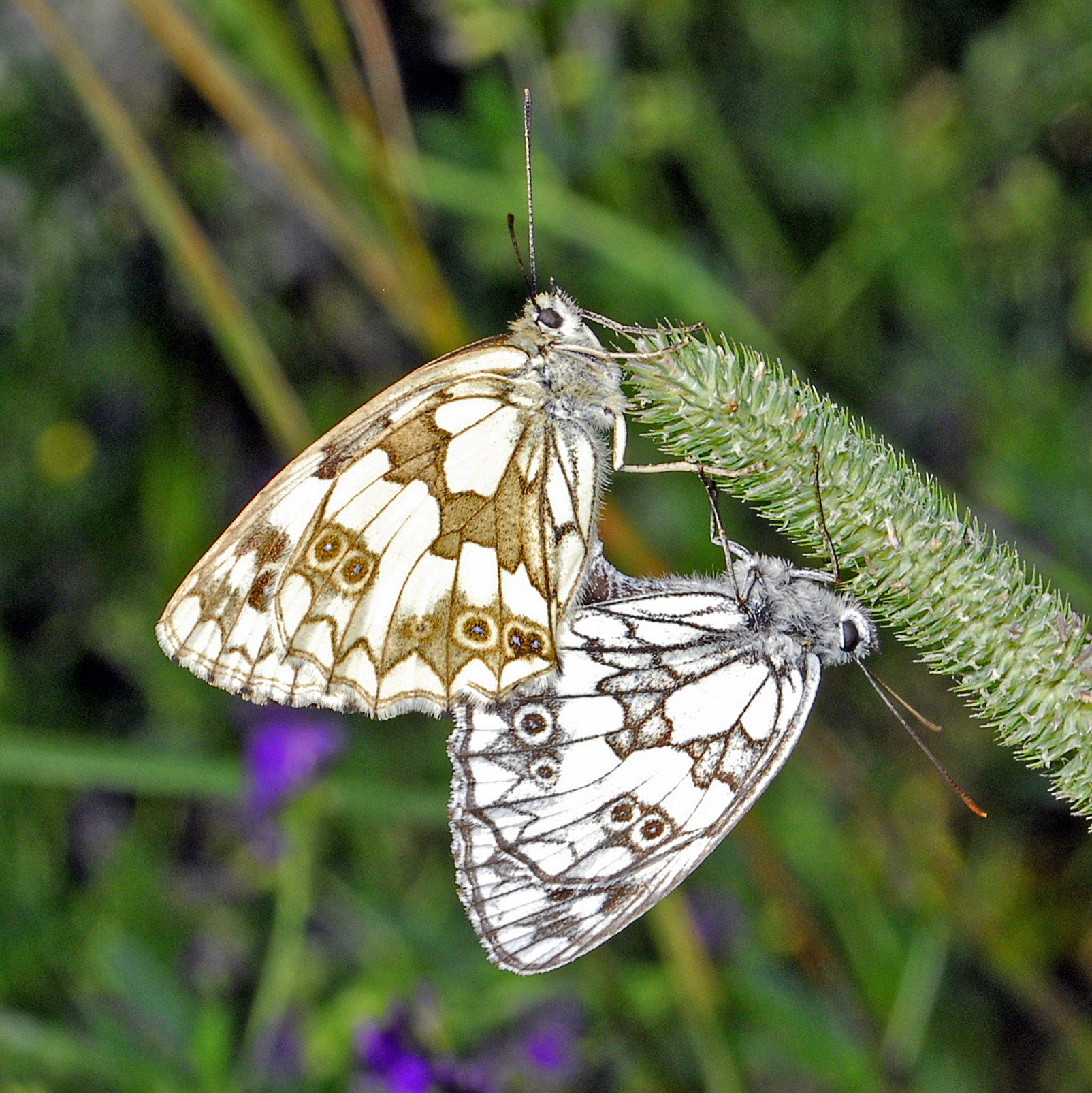
Mating

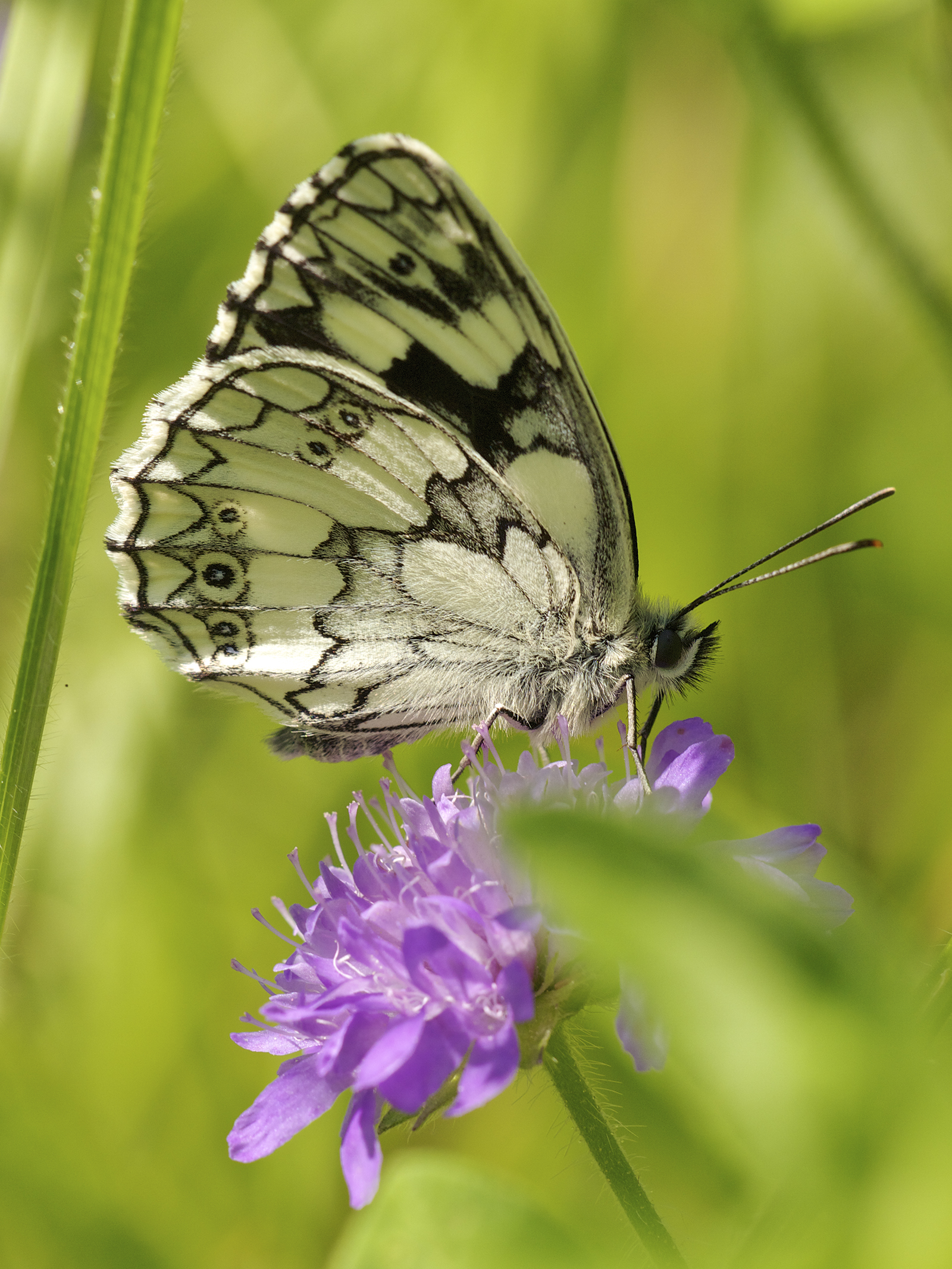
Male underside

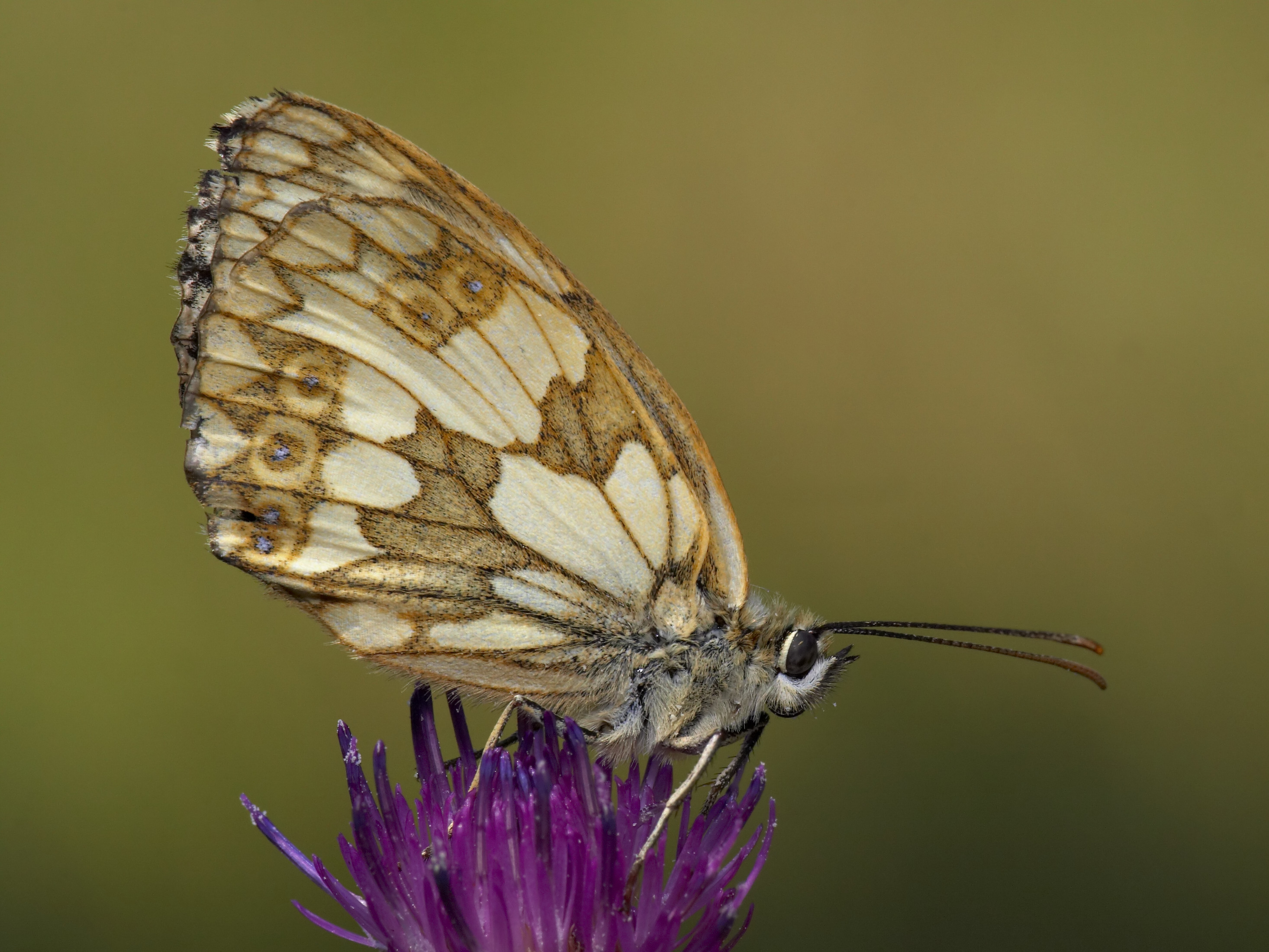
Female underside

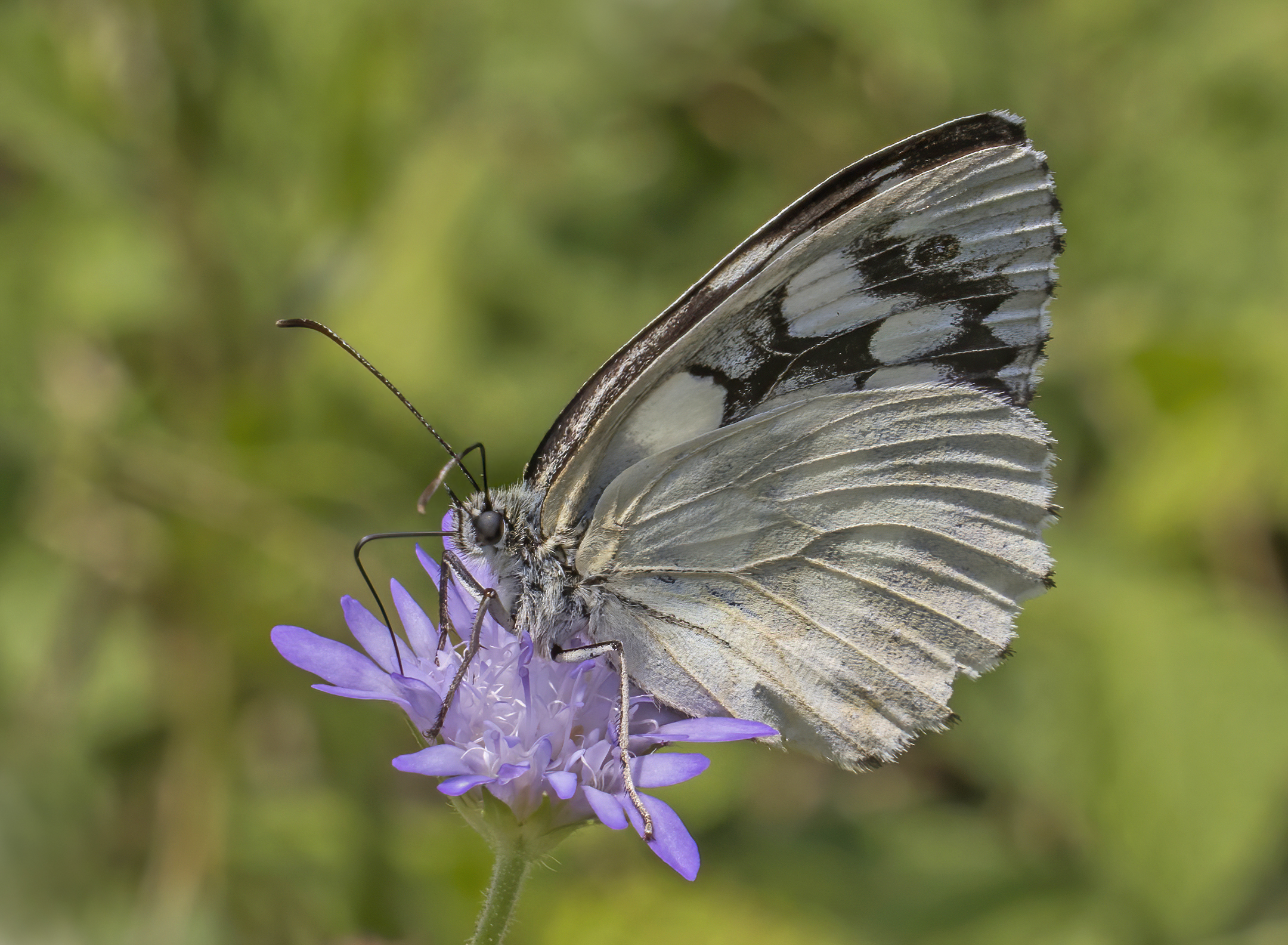
Form procida aberration leucomelas
