= Joseph Dandridge =

English silk-pattern designer and amateur naturalist (1665–1747)

- Born: January 1665; Winslow, Buckinghamshire
- Died: December 23, 1747 (aged 82); London
- Scientific career
- Fields: Entomology

Joseph Dandridge (January 1665 Winslow, Buckinghamshire – 23 December 1747 London), was an English silk-pattern designer of Huguenot descent, a natural history illustrator, an amateur naturalist specialising in entomology, and a leading figure in the Society of Aurelians of which he was a founder member.

Despite having left no published works, and not being part of the close-knit collectors of the Royal Society, Dandridge is credited by numerous entomologists of his time with having provided invaluable assistance and access to his extensive collections of specimens, and even near the end of his life remaining 'affable and communicative'. The collections spanned, besides insects and arachnids, shells, fossils, birds' eggs and skins, flowering plants, lichens, mosses and fungi. A volume of 119 water-colours by Dandridge dating from before 1710 of the arachnids, accompanied by meticulous notes, is in the Sloane Collection of the British Museum and is designated Sloane MS 3999. W. S. Bristowe discovered that this work had been used without acknowledgement by Eleazar Albin in his Natural History of Spiders and other Curious Insects of 1736.

Large numbers of Huguenot silk weavers moved to the Spitalfields area at the end of the 17th century. One of the most noted silk producers was James Leman (1688–1745), who was both designer and manufacturer and made use of other designers such as Christopher Baudouin and Joseph Dandridge. A number of Dandridge's silk designs dating from 1717 to 1722 have found their way to the Victoria & Albert Museum and may be seen in the Prints & Drawings Study Room.

Dandridge lived at Moorfields near Bedlam, close to his friend James Petiver, and for a while at Stoke Newington, which at that time was in the country. He became acquainted with the leading workers in the fields of his interests, such as John Ray, Adam Buddle, Benjamin Wilkes, Eleanor Glanville and William Sherard, and instructed Eleazar Albin, the watercolourist, in natural history.

According to Mendes de Costa, Dandridge 'had two daughters who were single women'.

Commemorated by Dandridgia dysderoides White 1849.

== Bibliography ==
- Rothstein, Natalie. Joseph Dandridge : Naturalist and Silk Designer. East London Papers, 9 (1966), 101–18.
- Rothstein, Natalie. Silk Designs of the Eighteenth century from the Collections of the Victoria & Albert Museum Thames & Hudson ISBN 0-500-23589-9 (1990)
- Salmon, Michael A. The Aurelian Legacy:British Butterflies and their Collectors. University of California Press. ISBN 0-520-22963-0 (2000)
- Stewart, Larry and Weindling, Paul. Philosophical Threads: Natural Philosophy and Public Experiment among the Weavers of Spitalfields. The British Journal for the History of Science, Vol. 28, No. 1, Science Lecturing in the Eighteenth Century (Mar., 1995), pp. 37–62. Published by: Cambridge University Press on behalf of The British Society for the History of Science
