= Eleazar Albin =

English naturalist and illustrator (fl. 1690–c. 1742)

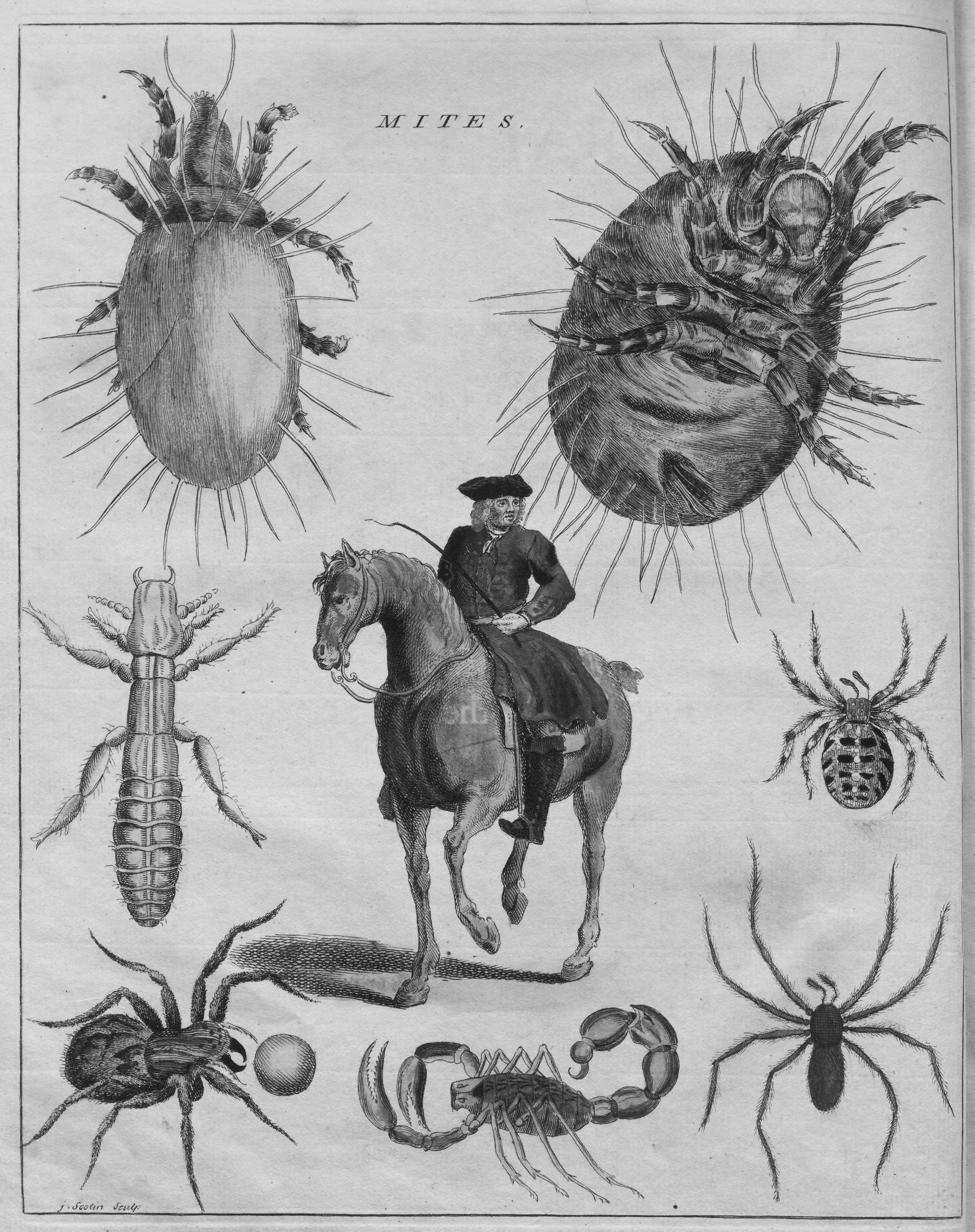
Frontispiece from 1736 edition of The Natural History of Spiders and other Curious Insects with Albin on a horse.

Eleazar Albin (c. 1680 – 1741/1742) was an English naturalist and watercolourist illustrator who wrote and illustrated a number of books including A Natural History of English Insects (1720), A Natural History of Birds (1731–38) and A Natural History of Spiders and other Curious Insects (1736). He has been described as one of the "great entomological book illustrators of the 18th century".

== Biography ==
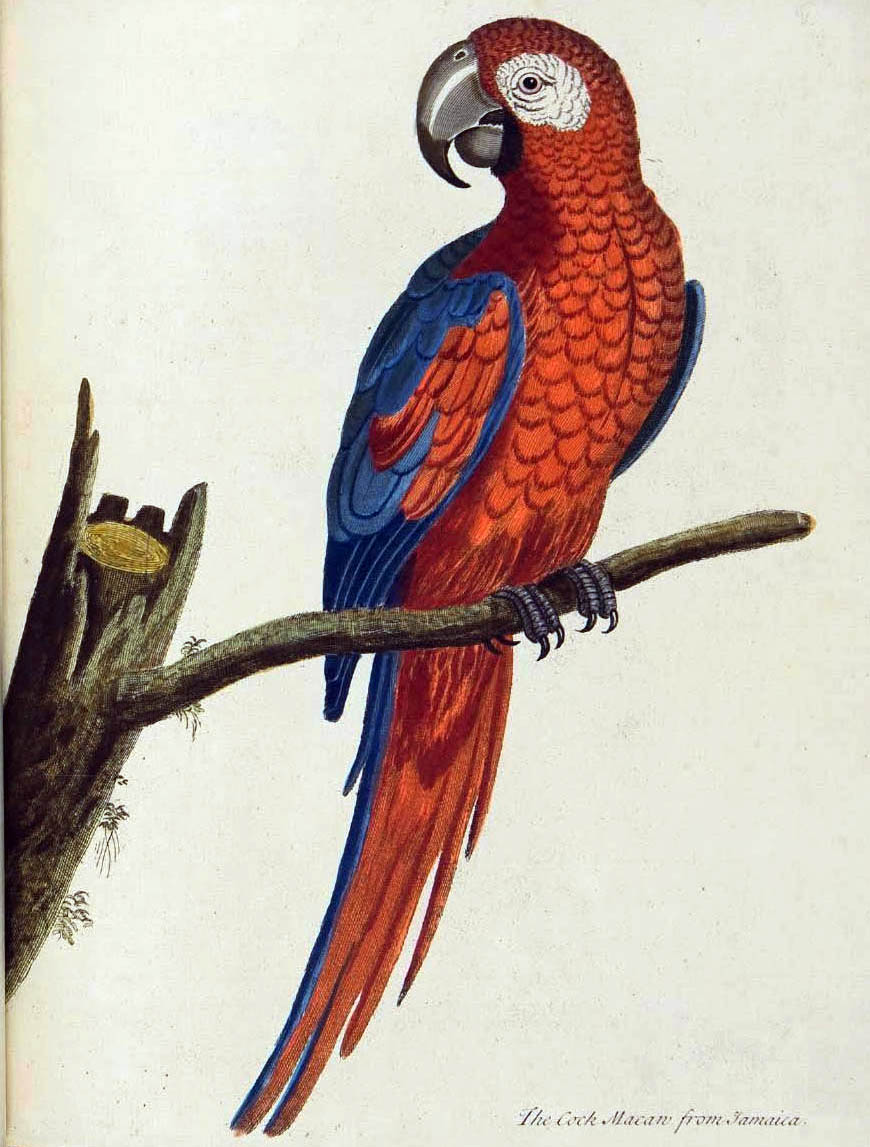
"Albin's Macaw", a Jamaican parrot, a 1734 painting by Eleazar Albin. This is almost certainly the red-and-green macaw (Ara chloropterus) from South America.

His date of birth is unknown but in 1714 he wrote that he needed to support "a great family". This suggests he may have married in around 1700 having been born in around 1680. Nothing is known of Albin's early life, though he may have been German-born; he claimed to have been in Jamaica in 1701. In 1708 he was living in Piccadilly, London when his daughter Elizabeth was born. According to autobiographical details in A Natural History of English Insects, Albin taught watercolour painting before being instructed in natural history by the silk weaver and naturalist Joseph Dandridge. In 1714 Albin published an advertisement for subscribers to his book A Natural History of English Insects but the work did not appear until 1720.

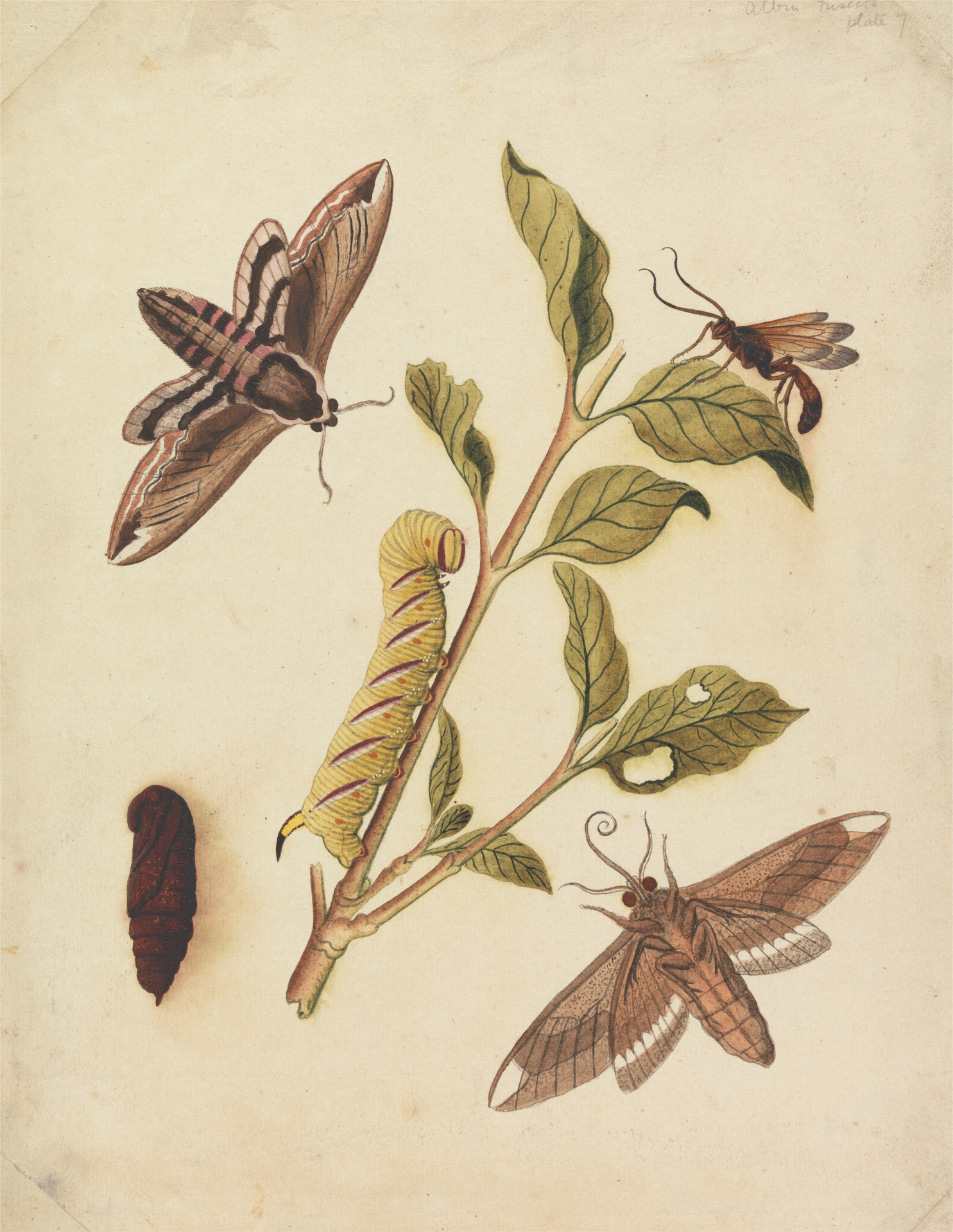
Privet Hawk Moths and Callajoppa Exaltatoria by Eleazar Albin, 1720

A Natural History of Birds has coloured engravings by Albin and his daughter Elizabeth Albin. In that book Albin writes "As for the paintings, they are all done from life, with all the exactness I could either with my own hand, or my daughters, whom I have taught to draw and paint after the life".

In his work on birds he describes the wood-crow (northern bald ibis) from a stuffed specimen belonging to Thomas Lowther, being probably the last description of this bird made while the species was still extant in Europe.

Albin was criticised by other naturalists. In 1840 the English zoologist William Swainson wrote that Albin was "without much knowledge of natural history and a very indifferent artist".

The exact date of Albin's death is unknown but an announcement of the sale of books formerly owned by Eleazar Albin, who was "lately deceased", was published in the Daily Advertiser newspaper on 22 February 1741 (1742 New Style).

== Works ==
- Albin, Eleazar (1720). A Natural History of English Insects. Illustrated with a Hundred Copper Plates, Curiously Engraven from the Life: and (for those who desire it) exactly coloured by the author. London: Self published.
- Albin, Eleazar (1731). A Natural History of Birds : Illustrated with a Hundred and One Copper Plates, Curiously Engraven from the Life. Vol. 1. London: Printed for the author and sold by William Innys.
- Albin, Eleazar (1734). A Natural History of Birds : Illustrated with a Hundred and One Copper Plates, Curiously Engraven from the Life. Vol. 2. London: Printed for the author and sold by William Innys.
- Albin, Eleazar (1738). A Natural History of Birds : Illustrated with a Hundred and One Copper Plates, Curiously Engraven from the Life. Vol. 3. London: Printed for the author and sold by William Innys.
- Albin, Eleazar (1736). A Natural History of Spiders, and Other Curious Insects. London: Printed by John Tilly for R. Montagu.
- Albin, Eleazar (1737). A Natural History of English Songbirds. London: A. Bettersworth and C. Hitch.
- North, Roger; Albin, Eleazar (1794). The History of Esculent Fish. London: Edward Jeffery, Robert Faulder, J. Cuthell and J. Deighton.

== Sources ==
- Jackson, Christine E. (1985). Bird Etchings: The Illustrators and Their Books 1655–1855. Ithaca, New York: Cornell University Press. ISBN 0-8014-9684-5.

This article incorporates text from a publication now in the public domain: "Albin, Eleazar". Dictionary of National Biography. London: Smith, Elder & Co. 1885–1900.
