= Benjamin Wilkes =

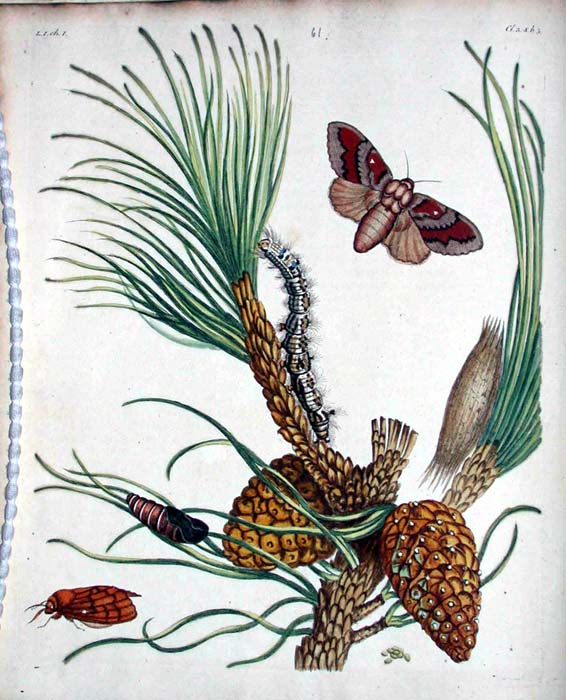
Wild Pine Tree Lappit Moth - Plate 61 from "The English Moths and Butterflies"

Benjamin Wilkes (died c. 1749) was an 18th-century artist and naturalist in London. Wilkes' profession was 'painting of History Pieces and Portraits in Oyl'. When a friend invited him to a meeting of the Aurelian Society, where he first saw specimens of butterflies and moths, he became convinced that nature would be his 'best instructor' as to colour and form in art. He began to study entomology spending his leisure time collecting, studying and drawing the adults, larvae, pupae and parasitoids (Tachinidae and Ichneumonidae) of Lepidoptera, assisted by the collector Mr. Joseph Dandridge. Wilkes' own collection was kept, "against the Horn Tavern in Fleet Street," London, "Where any gentleman or lady," could see his collection of insects. Henry Baker, writing in August 1749, stated that Wilkes had, "died of a fever in about a week after he had finished his laborious and elegant work," and paid tribute to Wilkes as, "indefatigable in his observations and faithful in minuting down every particular but for want of learning quite incapable of writing a book."

== Works ==
- 1742 Twelve new designs of English butterflies. This rare work consisted solely of twelve engraved plates each depicting geometric arrangements of both butterflies and moths. It depicts seven hawkmoths. The captions to each provide information on the time of emergence, host plants and occurrence of the caterpillar.
- 1749 English moths and butterflies. More ambitious, this work ran to three editions, the last of which incorporated Linnaean nomenclature and was published in 1824.

== See also ==
- Aurelian
