= Isaac Rand =

English botanist & apothecary (1674–1743)

Isaac Rand (1674–1743) was an English botanist and apothecary, who was a lecturer and director at the Chelsea Physic Garden.

== Life ==
Isaac was probably son of James Rand, who in 1674 agreed, with thirteen other members of the Society of Apothecaries, to build a wall round the Chelsea Botanical Garden. Isaac Rand was already an apothecary practising in the Haymarket, London, in 1700.

The year of his death is given by Dawson Turner as 1743 (Richardson Correspondence, p. 125); but he was succeeded in the office of demonstrator by Joseph Miller in 1738 or 1740.

== Works ==
In Leonard Plukenet's Mantissa, published in that year, he is mentioned as the discoverer, in Tothill Fields, Westminster, of the plant now known as Rumex palustris, and was described (p. 112) as "stirpium indagator diligentissimus ... pharmacopœus Londinensis, et magnæ spei botanicus.' He seems to have paid particular attention to inconspicuous plants, especially in the neighbourhood of London. Thus Samuel Doody records in a manuscript note: "Mr. Rand first showed me this beautiful dock Rumex maritimus, growing plentifully in a moist place near Burlington House" (Trimen and Dyer, Flora of Middlesex, p. 238), and Adam Buddle, in his manuscript flora (Sloane MSS. 2970–80), which was completed before 1708, attributes to him the finding of Mentha pubescens "about some ponds near Marybone", and of the plant styled by James Petiver "Rand's Oak Blite" (Chenopodium glaucum).

In 1707 Rand, and nineteen other members, including Petiver and Joseph Miller, took a lease of the Chelsea garden, to assist the Society of Apothecaries, and were constituted trustees; and for some time prior to the death of Petiver in 1718 Rand seems either to have assisted him or to have succeeded him in the office of demonstrator of plants to the society. In 1724 he was appointed to the newly created office of præfectus horti, or director of the garden. Among other duties, he had to give at least two demonstrations in the garden in each of the six summer months, and to transmit to the Royal Society the fifty specimens per annum required by the terms of Sir Hans Sloane's donation of the garden. Lists of the plants sent for several years are in the Sloane MSS. Philip Miller was gardener throughout Rand's tenure of the office of præfectus, and it was in 1736 that Carl Linnæus visited the garden. Dillenius's edition of John Ray's Synopsis Methodica Stirpium Britannicarum (1724) contains several records by Rand, whose assistance is acknowledged in the preface, and he is specially mentioned by the illustrator Elizabeth Blackwell as having assisted her with specimens for her Curious Herbal (1737–39), which was executed at Chelsea. He is one of those who prefix to the work a certificate of accuracy, and a copy in the British Museum Library has manuscript notes by him.

Rand prompted botanical artists like Blackwell, and Georg Dionysius Ehret, to make illustrations of the living herbaceous plants produced by the gardens.

Rand was friends with Mark Catesby, receiving seeds he collected in the Americas and a subscriber to his seminal Natural History of the region.

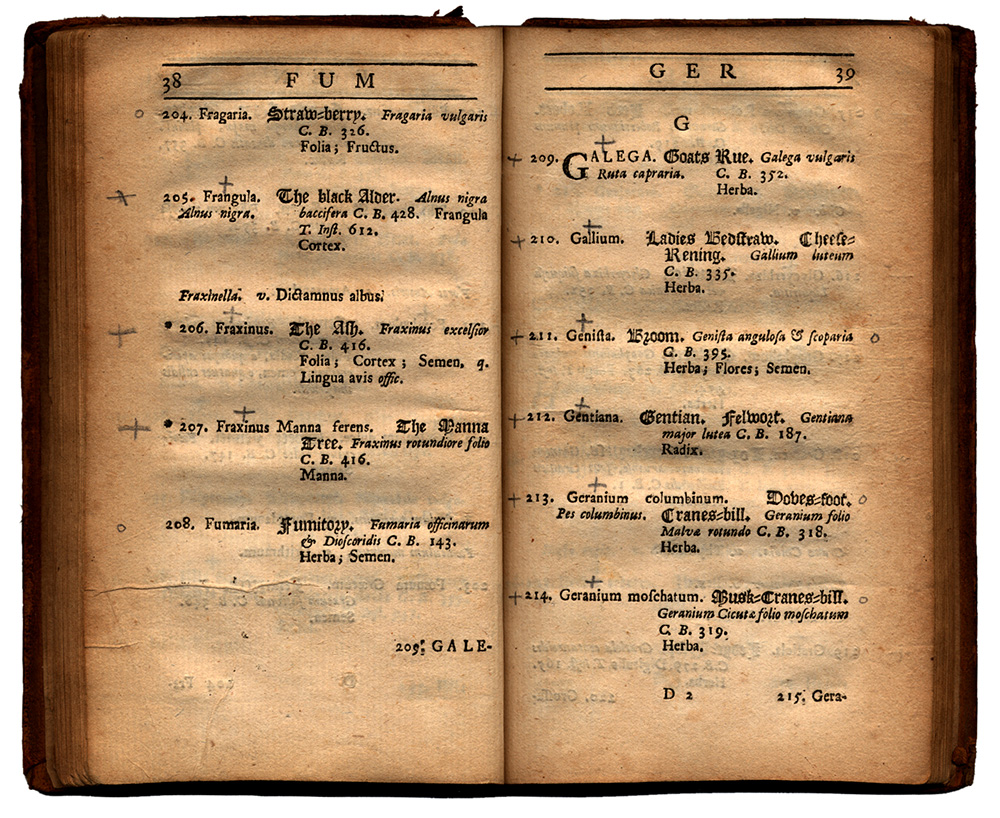
Page of Index plantarum officinalium ... in horto Chelseiano

Rand produced two catalogues of the Garden and coöperated with the Leiden Physic Garden via Herman Boerhaave. In 1730, perhaps somewhat piqued by Philip Miller's issue of his Catalogus in that year, Rand printed an Index plantarum officinalium in horto Chelseiano. In a letter to Samuel Brewer, dated 'Haymarket, 11 July 1730' (Nichols, Illustrations, i. p. 338), he says that the Apothecaries' Company ordered this to be printed. In 1739 Rand published 'Horti medici Chelseiani Index Compendiarius,' an alphabetical Latin list occupying 214 pages.

His widow presented his botanical books and an extensive collection of dried specimens to the company, and bequeathed 50s a year to the præfectus horti for annually replacing twenty decayed specimens in the latter by new ones. This herbarium was preserved at Chelsea, with those of Ray and Dale, until 1863, when all three were presented to the British Museum (Journal of Botany, 1863, p. 32). Rand was a fellow of the Royal Society in 1739. Linnæus retained the name Randia, applied by William Houston in Rand's honour to a genus of tropical Rubiaceæ.

He is also honoured in the naming of the genus Singaporandia (family Rubiaceae), which was found in Singapore, but also refers to Randia L..
