= Samuel Doody =

English botanist (1656–1706)

Samuel Doody (28 May 1656 – November 1706) was an early English botanist. He worked as an apothecary, corresponded with Hans Sloane and helped John Ray.

== Life ==
Samuel Doody was the eldest of the second family of his father, John Doody, who according to many sources was noted as an apothecary in Staffordshire. There is however no evidence that he was an apothecary and the confusion is due to his father John Doody (1616–1680) and his namesake grandson, John Doody (1687–1753). He inherited property in Yoxhall and purchased a malthouse and inn at Stafford and his profession at the time of death was recorded as "maltster". Samuel was born in the parish of St. Mary, Staffordshire on 28 May 1656. He apprenticed as an apothecary in 1672 and worked with maltster John Solley before going into his father's business, to which he succeeded around the year 1696. Doody also took an interest in astrology and astrological medicine. Around 1687 he had a private botanical garden.

Doody undertook the care of the Apothecaries' Garden at Chelsea in 1693, at a salary of £100. It seems he continued in these duties until his death. Two years later, he was elected Fellow of the Royal Society. He collaborated with Hans Sloane, Petiver, Jacob Bobart and Tancred Robinson. He assisted John Ray with his Synopsis Methodica Stirpium Britannicarum. He died, after some weeks' illness, the last week in November 1706, and was buried at Hampstead on 3 December. His funeral sermon was preached by his friend Adam Buddle, who was also a botanist as well as a member of the clergy.

== Works ==
Doody's sole scientific contribution, as an author, seems to be a paper in the Philosophical Transactions (1697), xix. 390, on a case of dropsy in the breast. He had given some attention to botany before 1687, the date of a commonplace book, but his help is first acknowledged by John Ray in 1688 in the second volume of the Historia Plantarum. He was intimate with the botanists of his time: Ray, Leonard Plukenet, James Petiver, and Hans Sloane. Doody devoted himself to cryptogams, at that time very little studied, and became an authority on them. The results of his herborisations around London were recorded in his copy of Ray's ‘Synopsis,’ 2nd edit., now in the British Museum, and were used by Dillenius in preparing the third edition.
