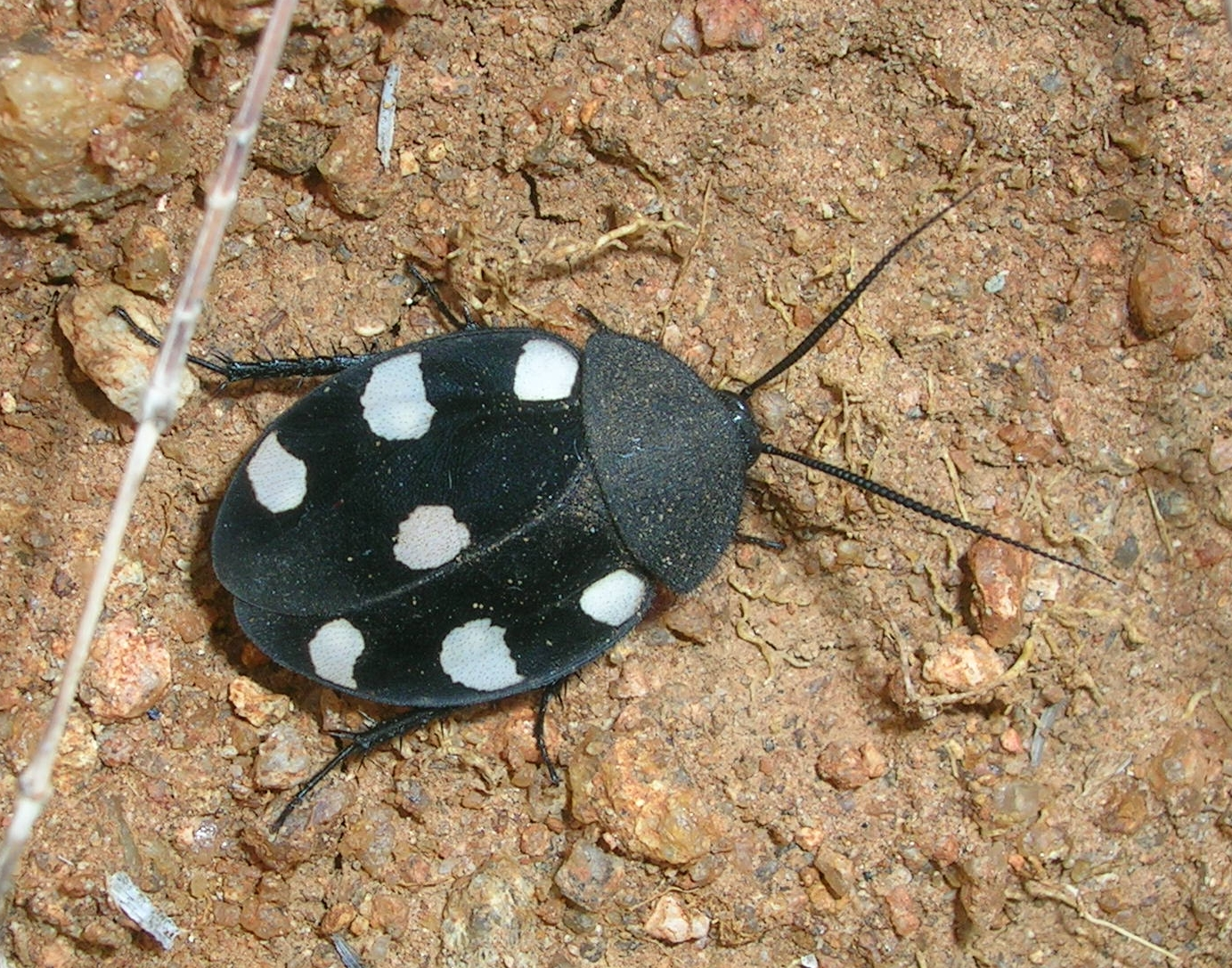

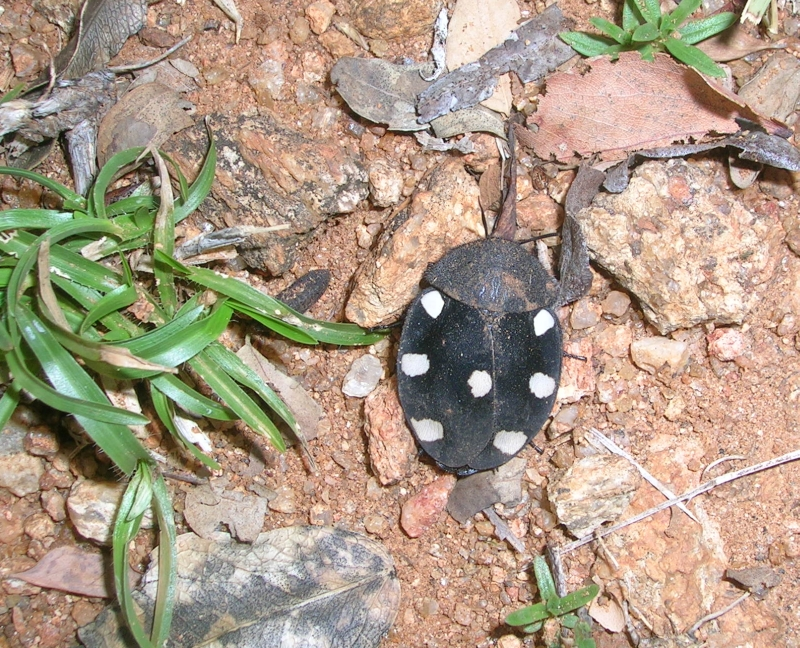
- Male above, female below (with shorter antennae)

Scientific classification
- Kingdom: Animalia
- Phylum: Arthropoda
- Clade: Pancrustacea
- Class: Insecta
- Order: Blattodea
- Family: Corydiidae
- Genus: Therea
- Species: T. petiveriana

Binomial name
- Therea petiveriana (Linnaeus, 1758)

Synonyms
- Corydia petiveriana Cassida petiveriana

= Therea petiveriana =

Species of cockroach

Therea petiveriana, variously called the desert cockroach, seven-spotted cockroach, domino cockroach, or Indian domino cockroach, is a species of crepuscular cockroach found in southern India. They are members of a basal group within the cockroaches. This somewhat roundish and contrastingly marked cockroach is mainly found on the ground in scrub forest habitats where they may burrow under leaf litter or loose soil during the heat of the day.

Domino cockroach walking

== Description ==
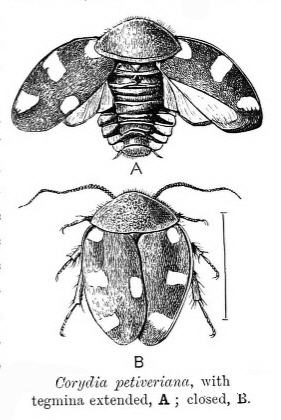
Pattern of spots on the tegmina

The black and white pattern of adults is believed to have evolved to mimic the pattern of the aggressive ground beetle Anthia sexguttata that has strong defenses, including the ability to spray chemical irritants. The upperside of the abdomen is orange-yellow, but is hidden by the tegmina. The spots on the asymmetrical tegmina are placed so that when closed, the spots appear symmetrical. The right tegmen lobe is bright orange-yellow. The species has been said to be one of the few cockroaches with "grace and beauty". The head is bent back underneath the pronotal shield (hypognathous) and the ocelli (simple eyes) face forward, helping sense light and thereby time, and they forage actively during early morning and late evening.

== Reproduction ==
Once a female has copulated with a male, she does not allow other males to approach, kicking them away with her hind legs. The eggs are laid in leaf litter. Up to 13 oothecae are produced by a female over 3 to 40 days (blocking the ocelli of the females has been found to inhibit the laying of eggs). The oothecae are produced as in other cockroaches by the secretions from the asymmetrical colleterial glands of the females. Once the ootheca is extruded it is deposited in suitably moist leaf litter. Nymphs lead a life hidden below the ground and may go as deep as 30 cm during the dry season.

== Taxonomy ==
This is the type species for the genus Therea. The species epithet is after James Petiver (1663–1718), who obtained specimens from Madras and its vicinity (probably from the surgeon at Fort St. George, either Samuel Browne or more likely Edward Bulkley). Carl Linnaeus placed the species under Cassida and described C. petiveriana and another that he called C. septemguttata, now considered a synonym.

== Communication ==
Like other cockroaches, T. petiveriana uses chemical pheromones to communicate with each other. When disturbed, they are said to raise their wings and evert lateral glands on the second and third abdominal segments. Their glandular secretions were found to contain volatile compounds N-3-methylbutylacetamide (MBA) and N-3-methylbutylpropanamide (MBP), making up nearly 60% of the volatile fraction. These chemicals appeared to induce alarm behaviour.

== Digestion ==
Like termites, these cockroaches have symbiotic bacteria and flagellates in their gut that aid in digestion.

== As pets ==
The conspicuously marked Therea cockroaches are popular as pets and easy to keep. The most commonly kept species has often been identified as T. petiveriana, but in 2009 it was instead suggested that the captive population actually belongs to a separate species, T. bernhardti, that differs primarily in the hindwings (which usually are hidden behind the tegmina), but also in small details of the tegmina pattern.
