= Georg Joseph Kamel =

Jesuit missionary, pharmacist, and naturalist

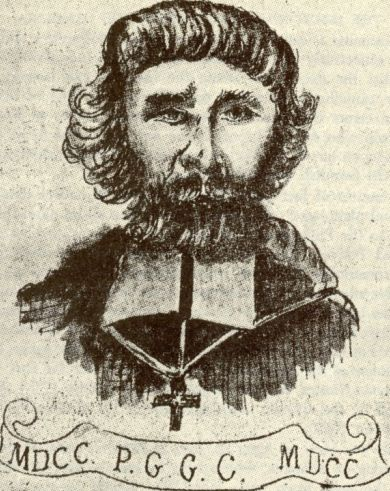
- Born: 21 April 1661; Brno, Moravia
- Died: 2 May 1706 (aged 45); Manila, Captaincy General of the Philippines
- Scientific career
- Fields: Botany, zoology, natural history
- Author abbrev. (botany): KAMEL
- Author abbrev. (zoology): KAMEL

Georg Joseph Kamel (German: [ˈkaːml̩]; Latin: Georgius Josephus Camellus; Czech: Jiří Josef Kamel; Spanish: Jorge Camel; 12 April 1661 – 2 May 1706) was a Jesuit missionary, pharmacist and naturalist known for producing the first comprehensive accounts of Philippine flora and fauna and for introducing Philippine nature to the European learned world. A number of Kamel's treatises were published in the Philosophical Transactions, while his descriptions of Philippine flora appeared as an appendix to the third volume of John Ray's Historia Plantarum.

== Biography ==
=== Early life ===
Kamel was born on 12 April 1661 in the city of Brno, Moravia (now the Czech Republic). His name suggests that he was of German origin. In November 1682 he joined the Jesuits as a lay brother and spent his novitiate in Brno. In 1685 he was sent to the Holy Trinity College in Jindřichův Hradec where he served as an assistant infirmarian and pharmacist. The Jesuit roster for that year indicated Kamel knew German, Czech and some Latin. In 1686 he was moved to the Jesuit college in Krummau where he worked as a pharmacist.

His pharmacy has been minutely restored and still exists in the local Museum of Český Krumlov During this time, Kamel applied to be sent to the Jesuit overseas missions and his request was granted.

=== Philippines ===
In 1687 Kamel was sent to the Philippines with a number of other Moravian and Bohemian missionaries. He embarked from Cádiz on 9 July 1687 and sailed first to Vera Cruz, New Spain. From there he traveled overland to Acapulco where he boarded a galleon and arrived in Manila sometime in 1688. In Manila he was assigned to the local Jesuit college, Colegio de Manila where he established the college pharmacy and gave free medical treatment to the city’s poor. He also created a botanical garden which became well known for its collection of rare and medicinal plants. In 1696, Kamel made his final vows at the Church of the Society in Manila.

Through Kamel's labours, the Jesuit College in Manila soon became the most reputed one in the Philippines and his treatment was sought by persons of high authority. At the same time, observing the Christian ideals of charity, he supplied remedies to the poor and the indigenous people for free. Kamel's reputation fast extended even beyond the Philippine Islands, as he entered into scholarly correspondence with learned men both in Europe and Asia. He exchanged letters, information and specimens with Willem ten Rhijne, a Dutch botanist in Batavia; Samuel Browne and Edward Bulkley, two English surgeons in Madras; and two members of the Royal Society, the apothecary James Petiver and the naturalist John Ray.

Kamel died at the age of 45 from a disease whose symptoms included diarrhoea.

== Work ==
Kamel drew, described and commented on diverse parts of Philippine nature: from plants to animals, from minerals to insects, shells and molluscs, snakes and even monsters (see below), with his first known text published in 1699.

Although the first consignment of his treatises fell into the hands of pirates and was lost, he successfully shipped his accounts to London where they were published by his correspondents Ray and Petiver. Kamel's descriptions of Philippine herbs, shrubs and trees were published as a 96-page appendix to Ray's third volume of Historia Plantarum (1704), while the remainder of his works appeared the Philosophical Transactions. Kamel was the first to acquaint Europe with species such as the tarsier, the colugo and the St Ignatius bean, a medicinal plant and source of strychnine. Linnaeus did not have a high opinion of Kamel's work and he was critical of the descriptions used in John Ray and declared them as “Descriptiones imperfectae. Florum nulla notitia.” Linnaeus preferred the works of Rumphius for plants of the region.

The majority of Kamel's surviving notes are now kept in the British Library in London, while one volume each are held in the Natural History Museum, London and the Maurits Sabbe Library in Leuven, Belgium. Copies of parts of Kamel's work can be found in his birthplace in Brno, the Czech Republic, alongside his birth register records and several other documents.

=== Overview of some of his works ===
Published as an appendix to John Ray's Historia Plantarum

- Plants of Luzon Island: Historia stirpium insula Luzonis et reliquarum Philippinarum. In John Ray, Historia plantarum, vol. 3, London 1704, pp. 1–96 (online).

Published in Philosophical Transactions from 1699

- On True Amomum (Gingeraceae): A description and figure of the True Amomum, or Tugus (1699), 21 (248): 2–4 (DOI:10.1098/rstl.1699.0002).
- On Bean of St. Ignatius (Strychnine): An account of the vertues of Faba Sancti Ignatii, mentioned last Transaction (1699), 21 (250): 87 (DOI:10.1098/rstl.1699.0018).
- A further and more exact account of the same, sent in a letter from Father Camelli to Mr. John Ray and Mr. James Petiver, Fellows of the Royal Society (1699), 21 (250): 88–94 (DOI:10.1098/rstl.1699.0019).
- On Some Philippine Animals: An account of Mr. Samuel Brown his sixth book of East India Plants, with their names, vertues, description etc. By James Petiver, apothecary, and fellow of the Royal Society. To these are added some animals etc. which the reverend Father George Joseph Camel very lately sent him from the Philippine Isles (1702), 23 (277): 1055–1068 (DOI:10.1098/rstl.1702.0003).
- On Philippine Birds Georgii Josephi Cameli observationes de avibus Philippensibus, communicatae a Jacobo Petiver, S. R. S. (1702), 23 (285): 1394–1399 (DOI:10.1098/rstl.1702.0051).
- On Philippine Coralls and Marine Animals: A description of some coralls and other curious submarines lately sent to James Petiver, apothecary and fellow of the Royal Society, from the Philippine Isles by the reverend George Joseph Camel; as also an account of some plants from Chusan, an island on the coast of China, collected by Mr James Cuninghame, chyrurgeon & F.R.S. (1702), 23 (286): 1419–1429 (DOI:10.1098/rstl.1702.0056).
- Tractatulus de ambaro, a reverendo domino domino Georgio Josepho Camello, communicatus domino Jacobo Petiverio Societatis Regiae socio (1704), 24 (291): 1591–1596 (DOI:10.1098/rstl.1704.0017).
- Philippine Plants part 1: Reverendi Patris Georgii Josephi Camelli tractatus de plantis Philippensibus scandentibus, ad Jacobum Petiver, S.R.S. missus (1704), 24 (293): 1707–1722 (DOI:10.1098/rstl.1704.0034).
- Philippine Plants part 2: Georgii Josephi Camelli de plantis Philippensibus scandentibus; pars secunda. Ad Jacobum Petiver, S.R.S. nuper transmissa (1704), 24 (294): 1763–1773 (DOI:10.1098/rstl.1704.0042).
- Philippine Plants part 3: Georgii Josephi Camelli de plantis Philippensibus scandentibus; pars tertia. Ad Jacobum Petiver, S.R.S. nuper transmissa (1704), 24 (295): 1809 (DOI:10.1098/rstl.1704.0053).
- Philippine Plants part 4: Reverendi Patris Georgii Josephi Camelli de plantis Philippensibus scandentibus; pars quarta. Ad dominum Jacobum Petiver, S.R.S. nuper transmissa (1704), 24 (296): 1816–1842 (DOI:10.1098/rstl.1704.0055).
- Philippine Fishes, Moluscs and Crustaceans: De piscibus, moluscis at crustaceis Philippensibus, ex manuscriptis reverendi Patris Georgii Josephi Camelli ad dominum Jacobum Petiver, S.R.S. transmissis (1704), 24 (301): 2043–2080 (DOI:10.1098/rstl.1704.0084).
- On fourlegged animals of the Philippines (including first ever picture of tarsier or flying lemur): De quadrupedibus Philippensibus tractatus a reverendo Georgio Josepho Camello transmissus Jacobo Petiver, pharmacopolae et Societatis Regiae socio Londini (1706), 25 (305): 2197–2204 (DOI:10.1098/rstl.1706.0002).
- Philippine Monsters and Snakes: De monstris, quasi monstris et monstrosis; item de serpentibus, etc. Philippensibus ex manuscripto reverendi Patris Georgii Josephi Camelli communicavit dominus Jacobus Petiver, pharmacopola Londini et S.R.S. (1706), 25 (307): 2266–2276 (DOI:10.1098/rstl.1706.0019).
- Philippine Shells, Minerals and Fossils: De conchyliis turbinatis, bivalvibus et univalvibus; item de mineralibus, fossilibus et thermis Philippensibus, ex manuscriptis reverendi Patris Georgii Josephi Camelli communicavit dominus Jacobus Petiver, pharmacopola Londini et S.R.S. (1706), 25 (311): 2397–2408 (DOI:10.1098/rstl.1706.0043).
- Philippine Animals:De variis animalibus Philippensibus, ex manuscriptis reverendi Patris Georgii Josephi Camelli communicavit dominus Jacobus Petiver, pharmacopola Londini et S.R.S. (1708), 26 (318): 241–248 (DOI:10.1098/rstl.1708.0037).
- Philippine Spiders and Beetles: De araneis et scarabaeis Philippensibus, ex manuscriptis reverendi Patris Georgii Josephi Camelli communicavit dominus Jacobus Petiver, pharmacopola Londini et S.R.S. (1711), 27 (331): 310–315 (DOI:10.1098/rstl.1710.0025).

== Plants named after Kamel ==
Several plants were named in Kamel's honour, though in his adopted homeland, the Philippines, he is mostly forgotten.

Carl Linnaeus named the well known genus of flowering plants Camellia in Kamel's honour. American botanist Elmer Drew Merrill named Eugenia kamelii after Kamel.

== See also ==
- List of Catholic clergy scientists

== Literature ==
- Cullum, Leo A. (1956). "Georg Joseph Kamel: Philippine Botanist, Physician, Pharmacist". Philippine Studies. 4 (2): 319–339. ISSN 0031-7837. JSTOR 42719223.
- Gicklhorn J. and Gicklhorn R. (1954) "Georg Joseph Kamel, S. J.: Apotheker, botaniker, arzt und naturforscher der Philippineninseln", Eutin: Holstein Internationale Gesellschaft für Geschichte der Pharmazie.
- Kroupa, Sebestian (2015) "Ex epistulis Philippinensibus: Georg Joseph Kamel SJ (1661–1706) and His Correspondence Network", Centaurus 57(4): 229–259.
- Murillo Velarde P. (1716) "Historia de la Provincia de Philipinas de la Compañia de Jesus. Segunda parte, que comprehende los progresos de esta provincia desde el año de 1616. Hasta el de 1716", Manila, pp. 393v-394r.
- Reyes, Raquel A. G. (2009). "Botany and zoology in the late seventeenth-century Philippines: the work of Georg Josef Camel SJ (1661–1706)". Archives of Natural History. 36 (2): 262–276. doi:10.3366/e0260954109000989. PMID 20014508.
- "Kamel, Georg Joseph (1661-1706) on JSTOR". plants.jstor.org.
