= Charles Dubois (treasurer) =

Charles Dubois or Charles du Bois FRS (10 September 1658 (baptised) – 20 October 1740) was treasurer to the East India Company, cloth merchant, and naturalist. He corresponded with other naturalists including James Petiver, William Sherrard and Hans Sloane and was famous for maintaining a garden with interesting plants from the colonies. He was instrumental in introducing rice cultivation in North America.

== Biography ==
Dubois was the son of John Dubois (1622–1684) and Anne, daughter of Charles Herle. The wealthy Huguenot family was in the cloth and silk trade and Charles inherited his father's home at Mitcham, Surrey, where he had a garden filled with the newest exotics at that time in course of introduction. The family ran a business at St Mary Aldermanbury. John Dubois was involved in the politics of London and represented the Whigs. In 1681 he was in the Committee of the East India Company. A son who was also known as John Dubois became cashier general to the East India Company on 30 September 1697. Dubois became cashier-general to the East India Company on 27 October 1702 after the death of his step-brother, John Dubois the younger. In 1730 Charles Dubois and his nephew Waldo Dubois were implicated in a financial scandal involving some cargo shipments and false accounts. In 1734 he and a clerk named Tullidge were implicated in monetary losses arising from accepting security notes instead of cash from traders. As regards botany, he seems to have been chiefly a patron rather than a worker; thus he appears as one of twelve English subscribers to Micheli's ‘Nova Genera,’ 1728. His name, however, occurs as having contributed observations to the third edition of John Ray's ‘Synopsis,’ 1724. Many of the plants in his collection was acquired by his step-brother Daniel du Bois while others came from correspondents such as Edward Bulkley in Madras. His dried plants occupy seventy-four folio volumes, the entire number of specimens being about thirteen thousand, and are in excellent preservation; they form part of the herbarium at the Oxford Botanic Garden. Dubois also collected shells, fossils and coins. He made notes on insects as well. Dubois obtained rice seed from India which was introduced into British South Carolina in 1766 through a Thomas Marsh.

He died 21 October 1740. It has been claimed that Robert Brown established his genus Duboisia in honour of Charles Dubois but it was actually named in honour of a Louis Dubois.
