= Tancred Robinson =

English physician (c.1658–1748)

Sir Tancred Robinson (c.1658 – 29 March 1748) was an English physician, known also as a naturalist.

== Life ==
He was born in Yorkshire, the second son of Thomas Robinson (died 1676), a Turkey merchant, and his wife Elizabeth (died 1664), daughter of Charles Tancred of Arden; he often spelt his own name Tankred. He was educated at St John's College, Cambridge where he was admitted in 1673 at age 15, and graduating M.B. in 1679.

Robinson then travelled for some years abroad, and, with Hans Sloane, attended the lectures of Joseph Pitton de Tournefort and Guichard Joseph Duverney in Paris. A letter from him to John Ray is dated from there in 1683. In September of the same year he wrote from Montpellier, where he visited Pierre Magnol; and, after staying at Bologna, where he met Marcello Malpighi, and in Rome and Naples, he travelled on, in 1684, to Geneva and Leyden.

In August 1684 Robinson was in London. From Montpellier he had written to Martin Lister a letter on the Pont-Saint-Esprit on the Rhône River, printed as one of his first contributions to the Philosophical Transactions in June 1684, and in the same year he was elected a Fellow of the Royal Society.

Robinson became M.D. of Cambridge in 1685, and fellow of the Royal College of Physicians in 1687, serving as censor in 1693 and 1717. He was appointed physician in ordinary to George I, and was knighted by him.

Robinson died at an advanced age on 29 March 1748.

== Works ==
Robinson's own contributions to Philosophical Transactions included ten papers on varied topics. Though his letters and papers deal with natural history generally, he paid particular attention to plants, and was styled by Leonard Plukenet in 1696 "vir de re herbariâ optime meritus", in his Almagestum. There is evidence that he assisted both James Petiver and Samuel Dale with the Latin of their scientific works.

John Ray was a good friend, and 17 letters from Robinson to Ray were printed in Ray's Philosophical Letters (1718). Ray repeatedly acknowledges his assistance, especially in his Historia Plantarum (1686) and Synopsis Stirpium (1690). Robinson was mainly instrumental in securing the publication of Ray's Wisdom of God in Creation, and suggested the Synopsis Animalium and the Sylloge Stirpium Europæarum.

Robinson has been credited with Two Essays by L.P., M.A., from Oxford, concerning some errors about the Creation, General Flood, and Peopling of the World, and … the rise of Fables … London, 1695. In a printed letter, in answer to remarks by John Harris, addressed by Robinson to William Wotton, a college friend, Robinson denied the authorship of the Two Essays. He admitted having assisted the author, and to having written the introduction to Sir John Narborough's Account of several late Voyages (London, 1694), and the epistle dedicatory to the English translation of Louis le Comte's Memoirs and Observations made in … China (London, 1697). Harris printed a reply to Robinson.

== Family ==
Robinson married Alethea, daughter of George Morley, and left a son William.
