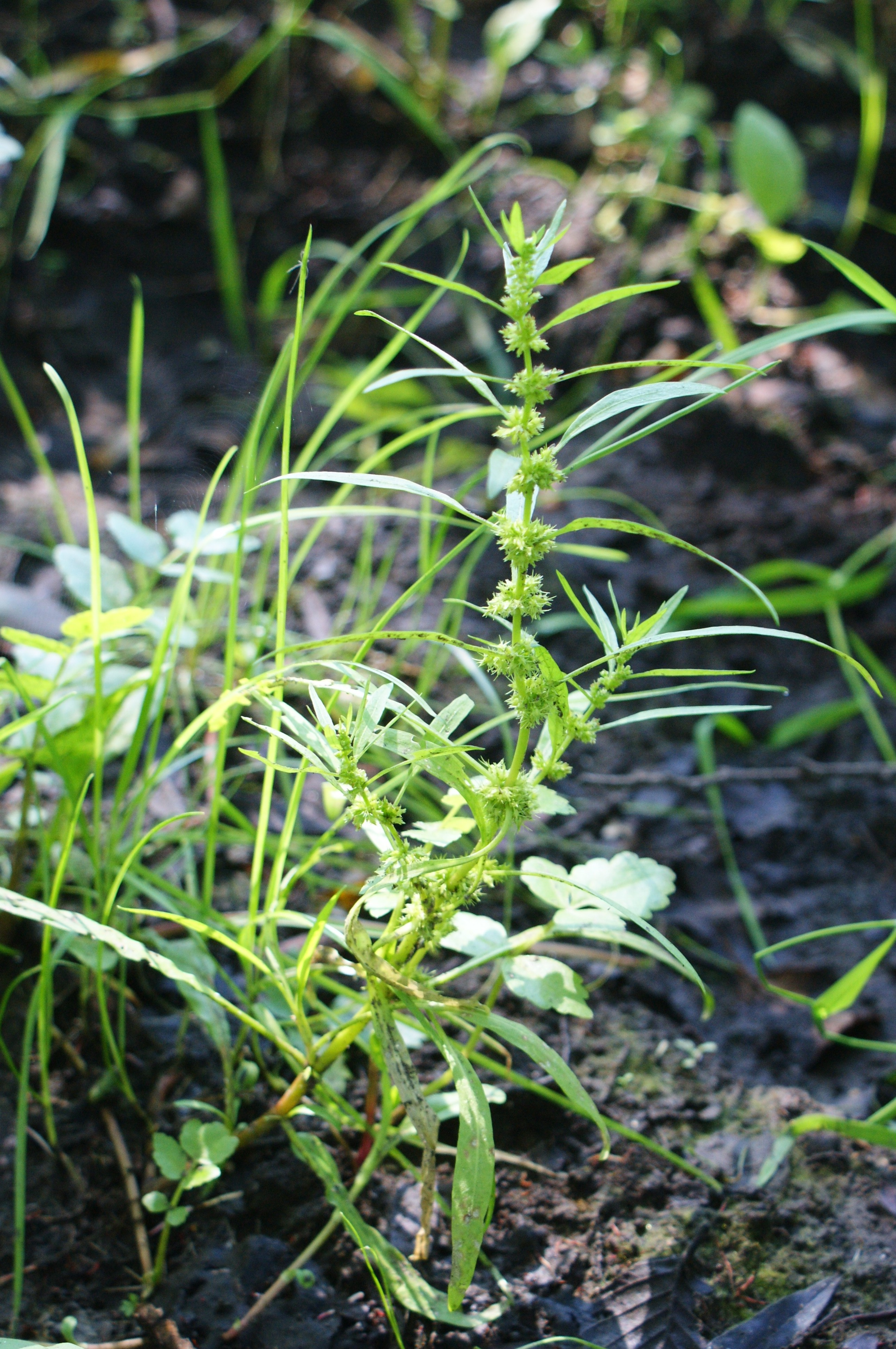

Scientific classification
- Kingdom: Plantae
- Clade: Embryophytes
- Clade: Tracheophytes
- Clade: Spermatophytes
- Clade: Angiosperms
- Clade: Eudicots
- Order: Caryophyllales
- Family: Polygonaceae
- Genus: Rumex
- Species: R. palustris

Binomial name
- Rumex palustris Sm.

= Rumex palustris =

Species of flowering plant

Rumex palustris, or marsh dock, is a plant species of the genus Rumex, found in Europe. The species is a dicot belonging to the family Polygonaceae. The species epithet palustris is Latin for "of the marsh" which indicates its common habitat.

== Description ==
Rumex palustris is an herb that can be perennial, biennial, or annual. The stem is upwardly inclined and bears sparse hairy protuberances. The stem is less than one meter tall. The branch attachment is alternate. The basal leaves are lanceolate; they are broader in the middle and taper to a pointed end. The cauline leaves are also lanceolate. The inflorescence consists of whorls with reddish-brown flowers. The root is wider at the middle and tapers towards the end.

This species' diploid number is 60.

== Taxonomy ==
The species name was first mentioned by Leonard Plukenet, based on a collection made by Isaac Rand. The authority of the accepted description, Rumex palustris, was James Edward Smith, in Fl. Brit. volume 1, on page 394 in 1800.

=== Subspecies ===
- Rumex palustris uliginosus
- Rumex palustris maritimus

== Habitat and distribution ==
Rumex palustris can be found in wetlands such as moist meadows, marshes, lake shores and the shallow edges of streams. It is native to Europe and is concentrated in the Southeastern and Middle parts of the continent. The species was also introduced to America; it now grows in California and New Jersey.

== Uses ==
Rumex palustris is used as a model organism for research. Most studies involve flood-resistance in Rumex palustris due to its unique mechanism to elongate in an effort to outgrow submergence. When flooded, Rumex palustris is able to elongate its petioles in order to emerge from the surface of the water. This mechanism is a beneficial adaptation for Rumex palustris to survive its wetland habitat and is being studied for research on plant stress resistance.
