= Samuel Browne (surgeon) =

English surgeon & botanist (??–1698)

Samuel Browne or Brown (died 21 December 1698 (Note: Desmond (1994) gives the date as 22 September but the tomb inscription is 21 December and the burial date is 22 December per Fort records (see Winterbottom, 2010))) was an English surgeon and botanist. He worked in the English East India Company factory at Fort St. George, Madras. Aside from his work he collected specimens of the local plants, especially grasses, along with vernacular names and made notes on their applications in medicine and other traditional use. He corresponded with several other contemporary naturalists including John Ray, Georg Joseph Kamel (of Camellia fame) and James Petiver.

== Life ==
Browne was stationed at the end of the 17th century at Madras, in the English factory at Fort St. George. Elihu Yale was the administrator of Fort St. George during this period. Browne had previously served aboard a ship, the Dragon, and was locally posted on 7 May 1688 after the death of Dr John Heathfield. The official surgeon appointed by the Company was Edward Bulkley who arrived only in 1692 and even after he did Browne continued to receive pay. Browne took an interest in the local plants and sent collections of dried plants and other botanical material to England along with notes on their local names. These were described by James Petiver, in a series of papers in Philosophical Transactions. Petiver's plants then passed into the hands of Sir Hans Sloane, and to the herbarium of the British Museum. From there they went to the Natural History Museum, London. Petiver was also in correspondence with Reverend George Lewis at Fort St. George, a collector of seashells. Browne was also in communication with Georg Joseph Kamel and John Ray. Some of the communications between Petiver and Browne are on the plants of the region as well as on the works of others. A letter to Petiver is on the 4th book of Bontius (De Medicina Indorum), "his animadversions upon Garcias ab Orto". After his death, Ray and Petiver were in communication with Bulkley. It was through Bulkley that Ray's Synopsis Methodica Avium (1713) included a list of birds and some illustrations by natives from Madras.

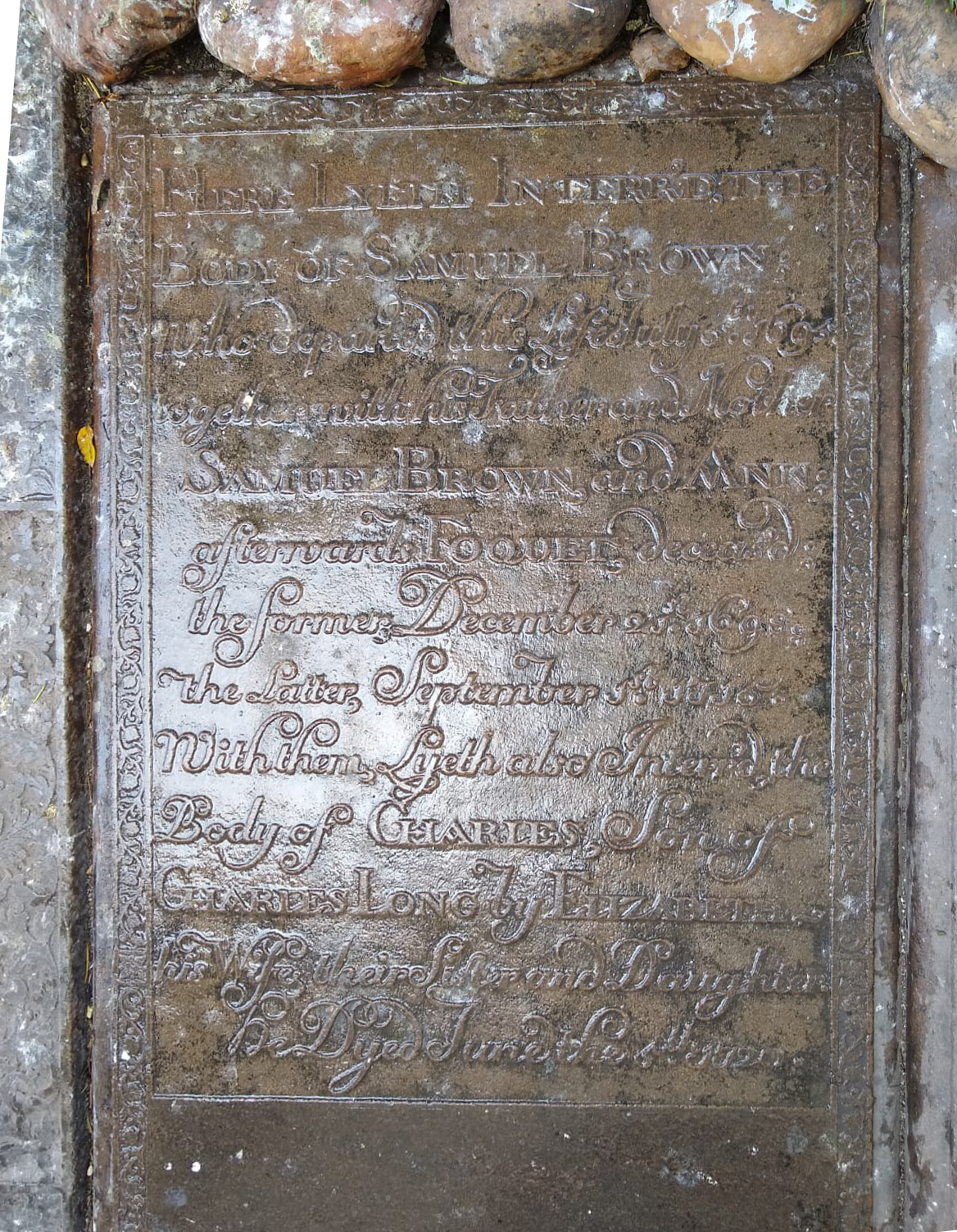
Inscription on family memorial stone in St. Mary's Church, Madras

Browne's medical career took a major turn when one of his patients, James Wheeler, a member of the Council took a dose of medication prepared by an assistant on the morning of 30 August 1693. He failed to turn for a Council meeting and died before noon. The medicine had apparently been pounded by Browne's assistant, using a mortar that had previously contained arsenic. Browne took responsibility for the death and wrote to the President of the Council- "I have Murthered Mr. Wheeler by giveing him Arsenick. Please to execute Justice on me the Malifactor as I deserve." The autopsy was conducted by Dr Bulkley and this was possibly the first post-mortem report published by the East India Company. Browne was acquitted by the Grand Jury.

Browne got into further trouble after drinking and challenging another physician, Dr. Blackwall from Cuddalore, to a duel in 1693; and was held in custody again in April 1696 for assaulting an Indian ("pulling the beard of a Mughal customs official"). He was then discharged from service on 3 January 1698 and the Council also took notice that a second surgeon had been employed at the Fort St. George against the regulations. He married Ann Baker in 1688, ten years before his death.

== Collections ==
Browne's plant collections in the Sloane Herbarium are made up of seven large volumes with dried specimens and Tamil names both in the original script (written on strips of palm leaf) and transliterated. Some plants are also accompanied by their Telugu names. Many of the plants mentioned are said to be febrifuges. Some remedies for smallpox, dysentery, and poisoning are to be found apart from medication for women and children. It is most likely that he was assisted by a Tamil medical practitioner who travelled with him. Unlike in the Hortus Malabaricus that Browne possessed, he does not note the names of his native assistants. When Browne was discharged in 1698 he wrote to Petiver that he had made arrangements for a "Malabar" (Tamil-speaking) doctor to help Edward Bulkley. Bulkley sent notes as well as drawings by local artists to Petiver.

Browne communicated with Georg Joseph Kamel in the Philippines. Browne brought Kamel to the attention of Petiver who noted that he (Browne) "''hath also procured me a correspondence with divers Ingenious Persons residing in remoter parts''”. Kamel's materials went to John Ray and some consignments were lost like the one in January 1698 when two volumes were lost due to a pirate attack on the ship transporting them. Kamel wrote to Ray that "evidence of ten years work was lost in a day, as I fear, in a day”. Copies were sent again but by the time it reached, Browne was dead. Fortunately Browne's widow passed it on to Edward Bulkley who passed on the collections.
