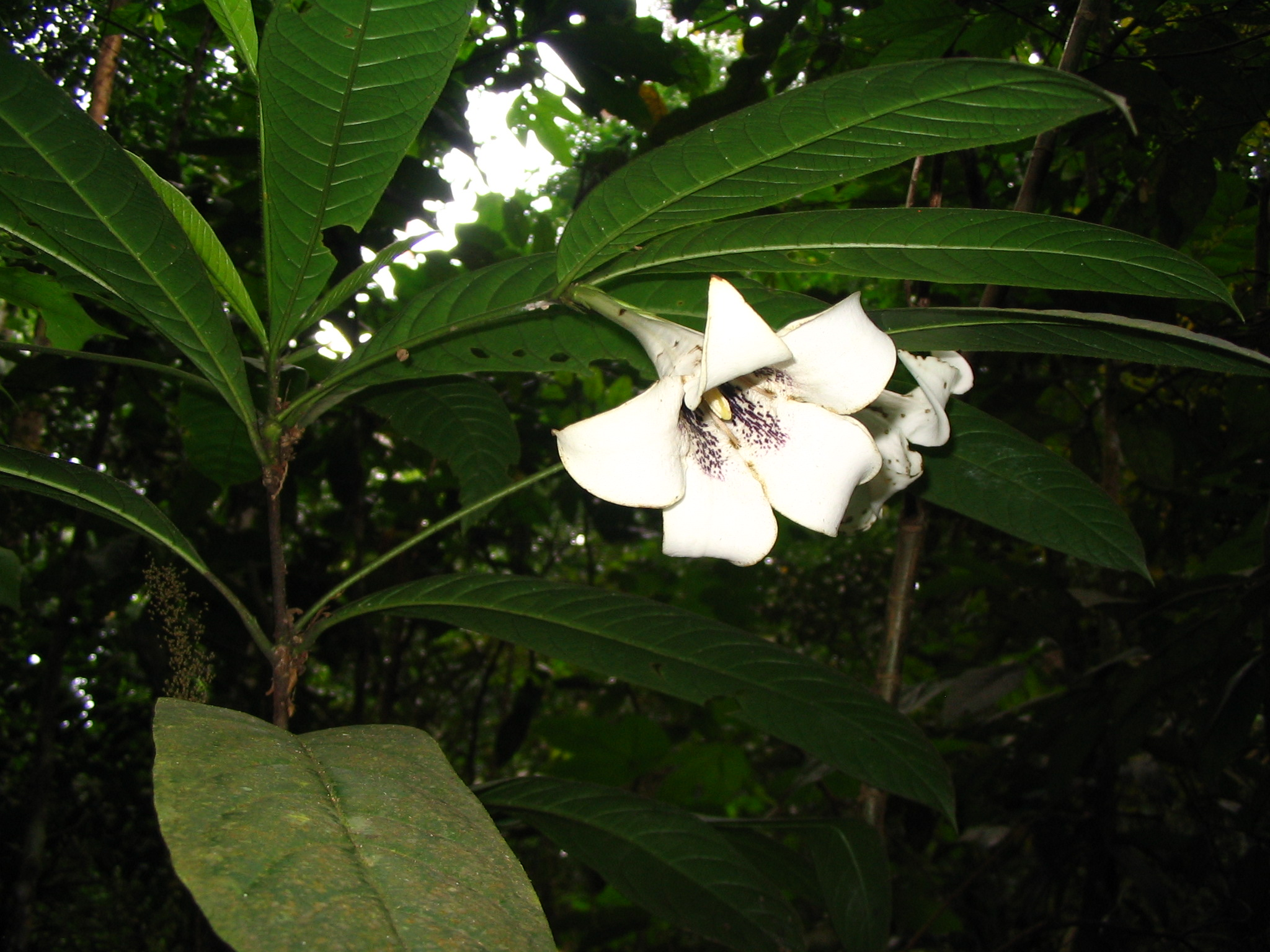

Scientific classification
- Kingdom: Plantae
- Clade: Tracheophytes
- Clade: Angiosperms
- Clade: Eudicots
- Clade: Asterids
- Order: Gentianales
- Family: Rubiaceae
- Subfamily: Ixoroideae
- Tribe: Gardenieae
- Genus: Singaporandia; K.M.Wong
- Species: S. macrophylla

Binomial name
- Singaporandia macrophylla (Hook.f.) K.M.Wong

Synonyms
- Randia macrophylla Hook.f.; Rothmannia macrophylla (Hook.f.) Bremek.

= Singaporandia =

Species of plant

Singaporandia macrophylla (Hook.f.) K.M.Wong is a small tree of the family Rubiaceae. It is the only species in the genus Singaporandia. It occurs in lowland dipterocarp forest in Malaysia, Thailand and Sumatra.

The genus name of Singaporandia refers to Singapore, where the plant was first found and also Isaac Rand (1674–1743), who was an English botanist and apothecary, who was a lecturer and director at the Chelsea Physic Garden, London.

The genus and species were circumscribed by Khoon Meng Wong in Sandakania vol.21 on pages 53 and 54 in 2016.
