= Historia Plantarum (Ray book) =

Botany book by John Ray

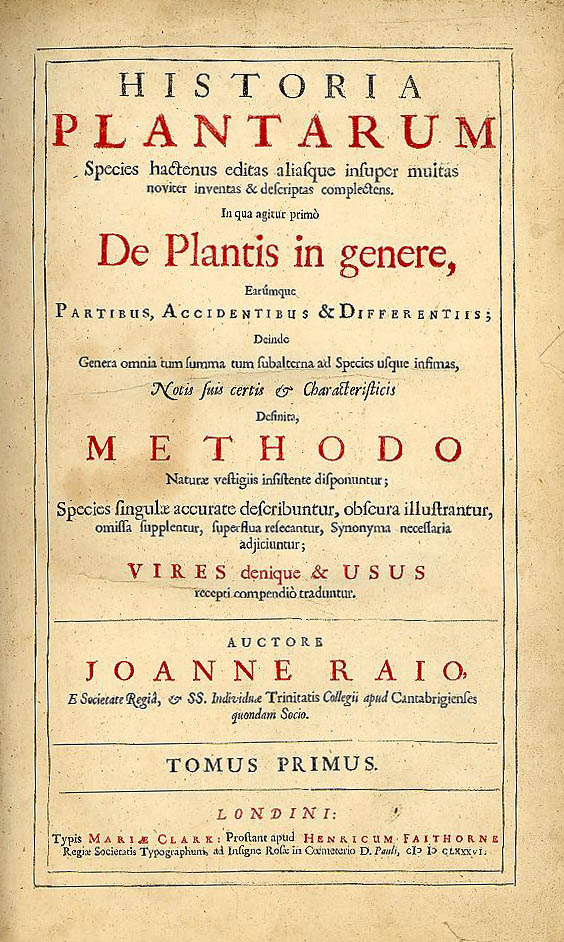
Title page of Historia Plantarum, John Ray, 1686

Historia Plantarum (The History of Plants) is a botany book by John Ray, published in 1686.

== Publication ==
Historia Plantarum was published in three volumes: vol 1 in 1686, vol 2 in 1688, vol 3 in 1704. The third volume lacked plates, so Ray's assistant, the apothecary James Petiver, published Petiver's Catalogue, effectively a supplement containing the plates, in parts in 1715–1764. The work on the first two volumes was supported by subscriptions from the President and Fellows of the Royal Society.

=== Editions ===
- Ray, John (1686). Historia plantarum. London: Clark. Vol 1 - Vol 2 - Vol 3

== Sources ==
- Armstrong, Patrick (2000). The English Parson-naturalist: A Companionship Between Science and Religion. Gracewing. ISBN 978-0-85244-516-7.
- Raven, Charles E. (1950). John Ray, naturalist: his life and works. Cambridge University Press.
