= Edward Bulkley =

English surgeon (??–1714)

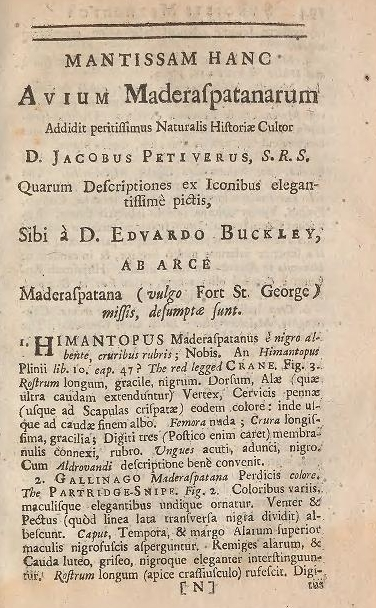
Page from John Ray's Synopsis methodica avium & piscium (1713) with a list of birds from Madras. Note that Bulkley is spelled as "Buckley" here.

Edward Bulkley (died 10 August 1714) was an East India Company surgeon (1602–1709) posted in Madras and a pioneer naturalist. He corresponded with James Petiver and was the first to document the bird species of which a list of birds was published by John Ray. Ray incorrectly notes him as "Buckley". Bulkley also studied the local plants and corresponded with the Jesuit botanist Georg Joseph Kamel and acted as an intermediary between Kamel and Petiver. Bulkley corresponded with Charles du Bois on plants and collected Tamil and Telugu names for many medicinal and economically useful plants.

Surgeon Bulkley is credited with conducting the first post-mortem in India. The case involved the death of James Wheeler in 1693 and the only previous such examination was in November 1680 when a soldier, Joshua Adams was killed by a strike on the head by Daniel Hughes. An examination of just the scalp was made but Bulkley's was the first case where a complete autopsy was carried out. James Wheeler was a member of the Council of Madras and had been treated by the physician Samuel Browne whose assistant had used a pestle-and-mortar, suspected to have been used earlier for arsenic, to grind pearls as medication. Bulkley determined from the autopsy that it was not arsenic poisoning as suspected and Browne was acquitted.

Bulkley was a correspondent of several naturalists in Britain and maintained correspondence with Petiver after the death of Browne who had previously supplied natural history specimens. Bulkley sent samples of soils from India to J. Woodward who included them in his 1729 catalogue.

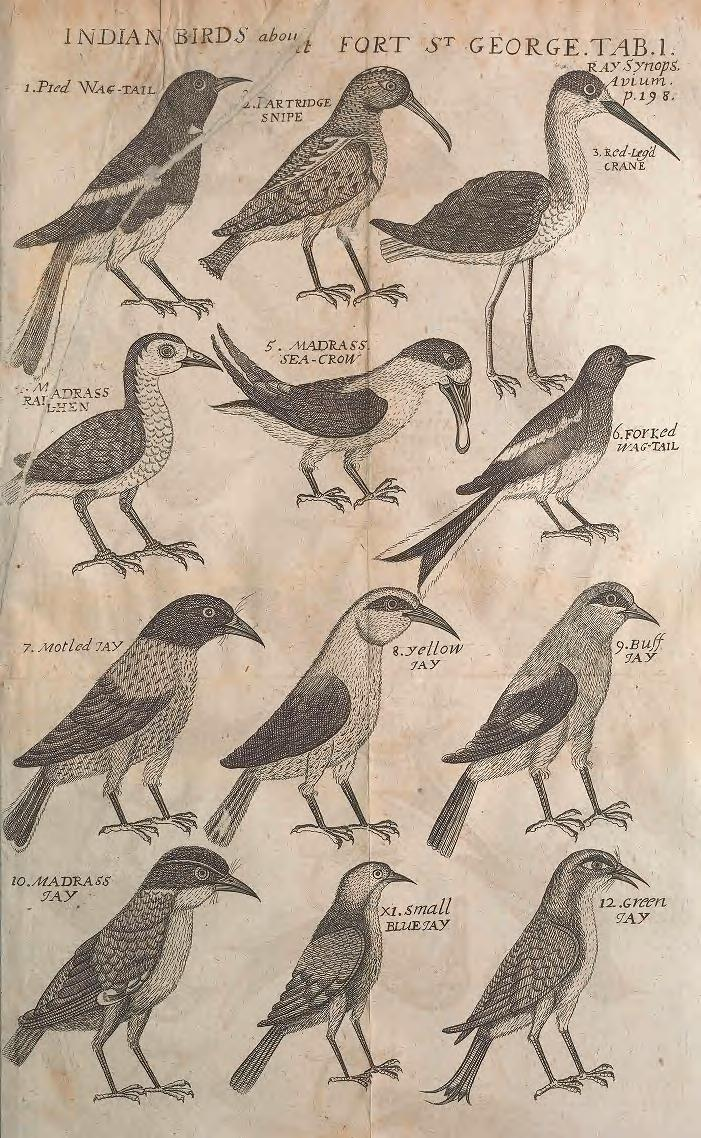
Birds about Fort St. George, one of the earliest illustrated account of the birds of India. The drawings were made by an Indian artist, the coloured originals are in the British Library.

Edward Bulkley also served as a Member of the Council of Madras and as a Paymaster. He resigned from work due to ill health in February 1713. He was buried in his garden in Peddanaikpetta, now in the Army lines opposite the Madras Medical College. The inscription on his tomb reads Sacrum sit hoc monumentum perenni memoriae Edwardi Bulkley, Honorabili Anglorum Societati medici, feliciter experti et ipsae tandema consiliis, qui cum naturae arcana diu indagasset, laeto animo ipsae satisfecit viii. Augusti MDCCXIV, et anno aetatis suae climacterico. Ne mireris viator quod in horto ubi animum perpoliebat, corpus suum voluit reponi, beatam sperans ressurectionem. His funeral sermon was given by Rev. William Stevenson at St Mary's.
