= Ray Society =

UK scientific society

The Ray Society is a scientific text publication society that publishes works devoted principally to British flora and fauna. As of 2019, it had published 181 volumes. Its publications are predominantly academic works of interest to naturalists, zoologists, botanists and collectors.

The society was founded in 1844, largely on the initiative of George Johnston and named after the naturalist John Ray (1627–1705). It is based at the Natural History Museum, London, and is a registered charity under English law.

== Publications ==
The Ray Society's publications are concerned with natural history, and have special but not exclusive reference to British flora and fauna. They include original monographs on particular groups and topics, facsimiles of historically important volumes and translations of existing works.

During Charles Darwin's lifetime, the Ray Society published not only Darwin's two volumes on living barnacles (1851 and 1854) but also the work of many of the foremost British naturalists: Thomas Henry Huxley, William Crawford Williamson, John Blackwall, Albert Günther, James Scott Bowerbank, etc.

Recent publications have included:

- Morton, B., ed. (2008). The Historical Ecology of the River Arun and its Beaches at Littlehampton, West Sussex: 1000 years of change. Ray Society. Vol. 169. London. ISBN 9780903874403.
- Malpighi, Marcello (2008). Redfern, Margaret; Cameron, Alexander J.; Down, Kevin (eds.). De Gallis – On Galls. Ray Society. Vol. 170. London. ISBN 9780903874410.
- Harrison, Keith; Smith, Eric (2008). Rifle-Green by Nature: a Regency naturalist and his family, William Elford Leach. Ray Society. Vol. 171. London. ISBN 9780903874359.
- Brook, Alan J.; Williamson, David B. (2010). Price, J. H.; Evans, Nicholas J. (eds.). A Monograph on some British Desmids: order Zygnematales, suborder Zygnemoidiineae, family Zygnemataceae, subfamily Mesotaenioideae (Saccoderm Desmids) and suborder Closteriineae, family Peniaceae and family Closteriaceae. Ray Society. Vol. 172. London. ISBN 9780903874427.
- Oswald, P. H.; Preston, C. D., eds. (2011). John Ray's Cambridge Catalogue (1660). Ray Society. Vol. 173. ISBN 9780903874434.
- Preece, R.; Sparks, T., eds. (2012). Fauna Cantabrigiensis: the Vertebrate and Molluscan Fauna of Cambridgeshire by the Rev. Leonard Jenyns (1800–1893): Transcript and Commentaries. Ray Society. Vol. 174. London. ISBN 9780903874441.
- Jackson, Christine E. (2014). Menageries in Britain, 1100–2000. Ray Society. Vol. 175. London. ISBN 9780903874458.
- Ray, John (2014). Nimis, Stephen A.; Tschantz Unroe, Kathleen; Vincent, Michael A. (eds.). Methodus plantarum nova (1682). Ray Society. Vol. 176. London. ISBN 9780903874465.
- Linnaeus, Carl (2013). Stearn, W. T.; Jarvis, C. E. (eds.). Linnaeus Species Plantarum 1753 (Facsimile: Volume 1). Ray Society. Vol. 177. London. ISBN 9780903874472.
- Linnaeus, Carl (2013). Jarvis, C. E.; Heller, J. L.; Stearn, W. T. (eds.). Linnaeus Species Plantarum 1753 (Facsimile: Volume 2). Ray Society. Vol. 178. London. ISBN 9780903874489.
- Clayton, Dudley (2017). Charles Parish: plant hunter and botanical artist in Burma. Ray Society. Vol. 179. London. ISBN 9780903874502.
- Else, George R.; Edwards, Mike (2018). Handbook of the Bees of the British Isles. Ray Society. Vol. 180. London. ISBN 978-0-903874-51-9. (in 2 volumes)
- Britz, Ralf, ed. (2019). Francis Hamilton's Gangetic Fishes in Colour: a new edition of the 1822 monograph, with reproductions of unpublished coloured illustrations. Ray Society. Vol. 181. London. ISBN 978-0-903874-52-6.

A complete list of all volumes is available on the Society's website.

== Collections ==
University College London holds c.150 items published by the Ray Society, a near complete set of works between 1844 and 1996.
