= James Petiver =

British biologist & pharmacist (c.1665–1718)

- Born: between 1663 and 1665; Hillmorton, Warwickshire, England
- Died: 2 April 1718
- Known for: specimen collections
- Scientific career
- Fields: Botany; Entomology; Pharmacy

James Petiver (c. 1665 – c. 2 April 1718) was a London apothecary, a fellow of the Royal Society as well as London's informal Temple Coffee House Botany Club, famous for his specimen collections in which he traded and study of botany and entomology. He corresponded with John Ray and Maria Sibylla Merian. Some of his notes and specimens were used by Carolus Linnaeus in descriptions of new species. The genus Petiveria was named in his honour by Charles Plumier. His collections were bought by Sir Hans Sloane and became a part of the Natural History Museum.

== Life ==
Born somewhere between 1663 and 1665 in Hillmorton, Warwickshire, to James (baptism record from Hillmorton has "Pettyfer", 22 February 1635) and Mary née Elborow, the family moved to London soon after where his father became a haberdasher. After the death of his father in 1676, Petiver was sent to Rugby Free School, sponsored by his maternal grandfather Richard Elborow. Petiver later stated that "I have often bewailed my not being allowed after that time academical learning." He became an apprentice to an apothecary Charles Feltham in London on 5 June 1677, and was made a freeman of the Society of Apothecaries on 6 October 1685, later supplying medicine to St. Bartholomew's Hospital.

In 1692 he set up his apothecary practice "at the sign of the white cross" on Aldersgate and lived in London for the rest of his life. His interest in natural history may have come from visits to the garden of the Society for Apothecaries or at Fulham Palace. Early naturalist influences included John Watts and fellow apothecary Samuel Doody. The Temple Coffee House Botany Club, an informal group set up around 1689 by several people, including Dr Hans Sloane, was a place of botanical discussion. By 1691, the club included Martin Lister, Tancred Robinson, John Watts, Nehemiah Grew, William Sherard, Samuel Doody, Leonard Plukenet, Charles Hatton, Adam Buddle, and Samuel Dale. Petiver began to collect objects of natural history through his networks and his office became a centre for visiting travellers and collectors. Collectors and correspondents included Rev. John Banister from Virginia, Samuel Browne in Madras, surgeon Edward Bartar in Africa, John Smyth in Jamaica, and John Dickinson in Bermuda. In 1695 he published a catalogue, the first of many, of his collections as Musei Petiverani Centuria Prima Rariora Naturae Continens.

He managed numerous specimens received by post and was routinely sending collection instructions to his correspondents (he had nearly 80 in America). One visitor, Zacharias von Uffenbach, noted that his specimens were poorly documented and heaped into a cabinet unworthy of display. In 1700 he was appointed as Apothecary to the Charterhouse. Patrick Blair promoted Petiver's publications in Scotland. Petiver himself did not travel much with visits restricted to Bristol and Cambridge and in 1711 to the Netherlands. He was known for his administrative ability which he extended to the Royal Society to which he (along with Samuel Doody) was elected in 1695 and Society of Apothecaries.

He never married and was found dead around 2 April 1718 (incorrectly noted as 20 April in some sources) after a long illness. His body was taken on 10 April, the pallbearers included Sir Hans Sloane, Dr Levit and four other physicians and was buried at St Botolph Church on Aldersgate.

== Scientific work ==
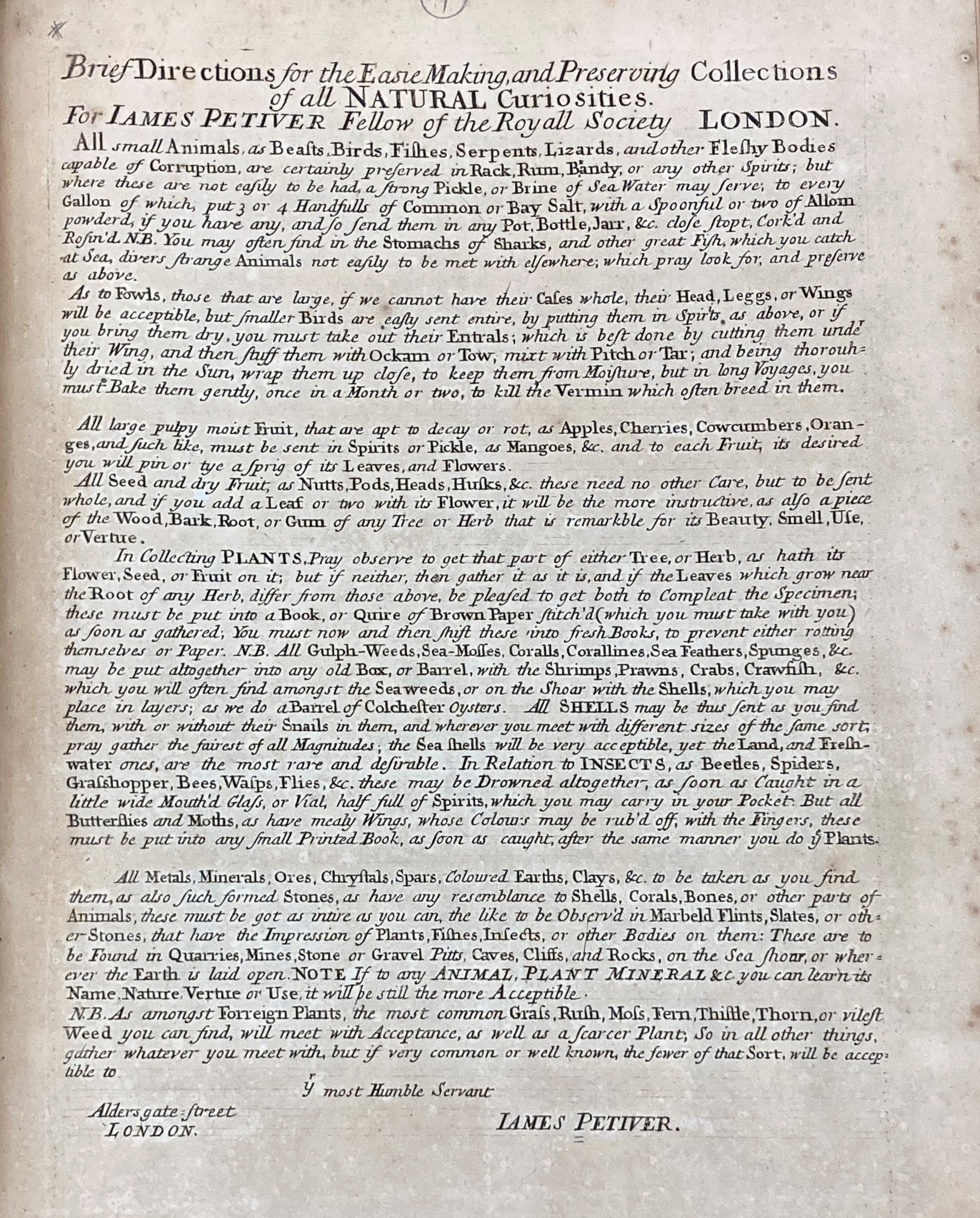
Petiver's instructions for specimen collectors, c. 1709

Petiver made use of a global network of collectors who worked aboard colonial trading ships and naval vessels, about a quarter to a third of his collectors were associated with the global slave trade. The collection that Petiver amassed was the largest natural history collection in his time.

Petiver visited the Netherlands in 1711 on behalf of Sloane to study the collections of the Dutch entomologist Paul Hermann. He also met Boerhaave and other Dutch naturalists of the period and received an honorary degree from the University of Leiden. He recorded many English folk-names for butterflies, also coining some himself, and wrote some of the first butterfly books that used English names in addition to Latin. He himself was not very proficient in Latin although he was a member of several scholarly societies and an educated gentleman. He named the white admiral butterfly, and gave the name fritillary to another group of butterflies after the Latin word for a chequered dice box. He called skippers "hogs", swallowtails "Royal Williams", walls as "Enfield Eyes" and marbled whites as "Half-Mourners".

Petiver received many specimens, seeds and much other material from overseas correspondents including Samuel Browne and Edward Bulkley in Madras, Jezreel Jones in Barbary, and the Czech Jesuit Georg Joseph Kamel in Manila. Petiver traded these specimens, often at exorbitant prices. From 1709 he used his position in the Society of Apothecaries to use the Chelsea botanic garden for his personal gain. After his death, his collections went to his sister Jane Woodstock and were purchased by Sir Hans Sloane for £4000, and some of it is now in the Natural History Museum in London. Sloane found the condition of Petiver's collections appalling on purchase in 1718.

== Published works ==
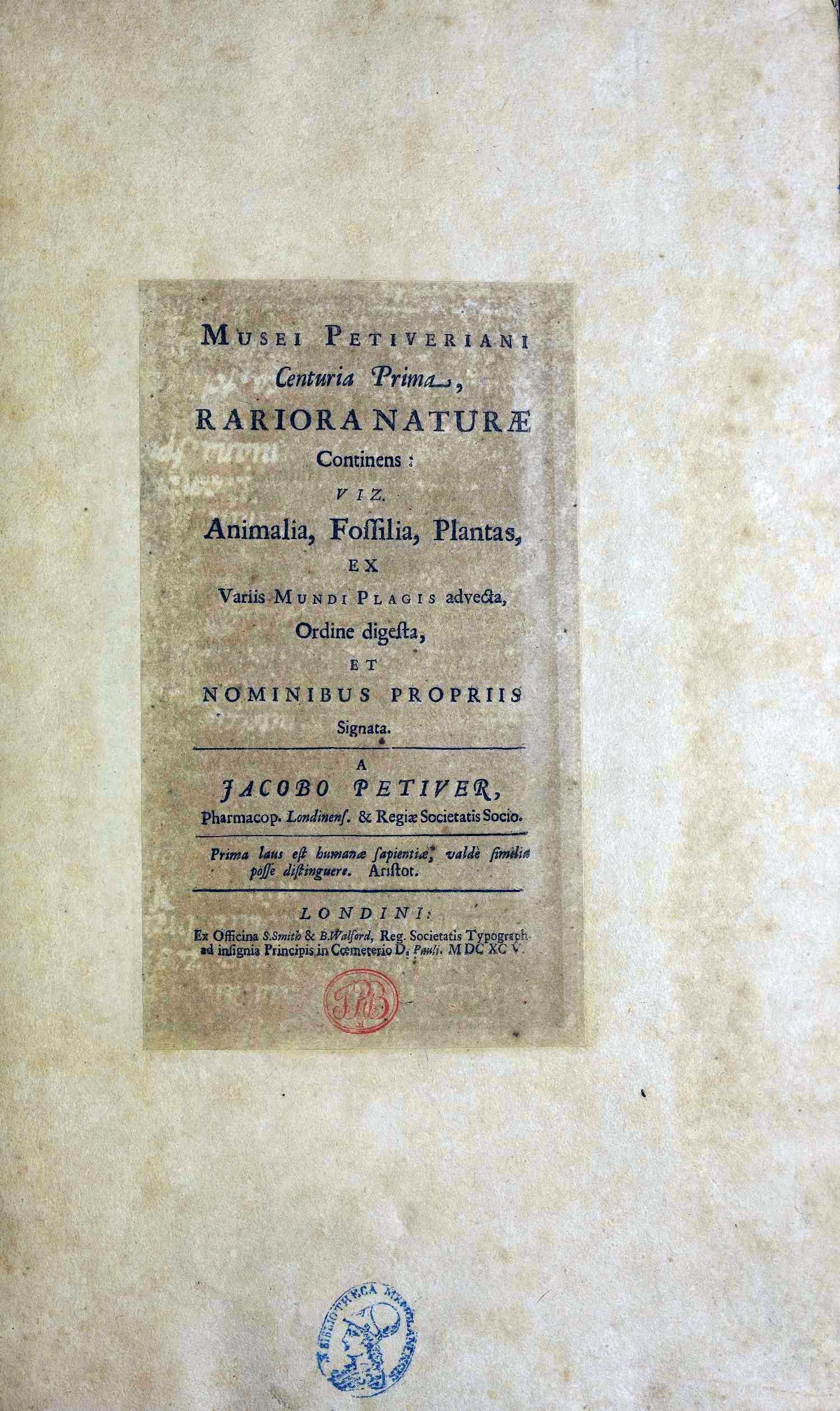
Musei Petiveriani centuriae, 1695

- Musei Petiveriani centuriae (in Latin). London: Samuel Smith & Benjamin Walford. 1695.
- 1698 An account of some Indian plants etc. with their names, descriptions and vertues; communicated in a letter from Mr James Petiver...to Mr Samuel Brown, surgeon at Fort St George, Philosophical Transactions of the Royal Society of London.
- 1700–1703 — An account of part of a collection of curious plants and drugs, lately given to the Royal Society of the East India Company, Philosophical Transactions of the Royal Society
- Gazophylacii naturae & artis decades (in Latin). London: Samuel Smith & Christopher Bateman. 1702–1706.
- Gazophylacium naturae et artis (1702–06) — an illustrated catalogue of British insects
- Papilionum Britanniae icones (1717) — included 80 British butterflies with life-histories based on rearing
