= Samuel Dale (physician) =

English physician (1659–1739)

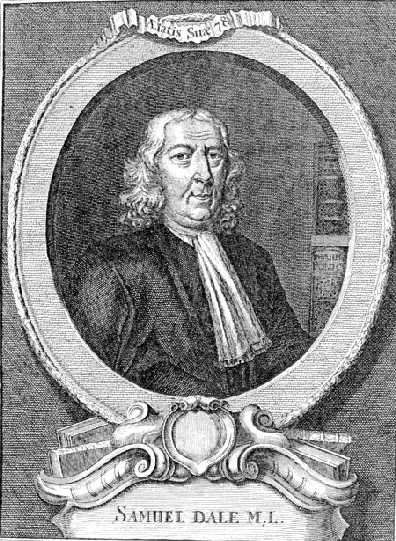
- Portrait of Samuel Dale
- Born: 1659; London, England
- Died: 18 March 1739 (aged 79–80); Braintree, Essex
- Scientific career
- Fields: Physiology, Botany, Geology
- Author abbrev. (botany): S.Dale

Samuel Dale (1659 – 18 March 1739) was an English naturalist and physician notable for his work in the natural sciences and his authorship of the Pharmacologia seu Manuductio ad Materiam Medicam in 1693.

== Career ==
Born in London, England, Dale was apprenticed to an apothecary at the age of 15. In 1680, he left to open his own apothecary's shop in Braintree, Essex. He soon became licensed to practise medicine, and worked as a general doctor. It was in this position where Dale met and befriended John Ray, and began to assist him in his botanical work. While studying under Ray, Dale undertook regular excursions collecting plants for both his apothecary business, and for personal enjoyment. He assisted with some of Ray's publications, including the Synopsis methodica stirpium Britannicarum in 1690.

Dale also began authoring his own works, including Pharmacologia in 1693, which was a well received textbook of pharmacology and therapeutics. Samuel Dale contributed nine papers to the Philosophical Transactions of the Royal Society including the first account of the strata and fossils of Harwich cliff.

By 1737, Dale was given a license to practice physic by the Royal College of Physicians, earning the title of physician. He died on March 18, 1739.

== Legacy ==
Dale’s name is honoured in the gastropod Buccinum dalei and in the botanical genera Dalea. An oil painting of Dale hangs at the Apothecaries' Hall in London.

== Books ==
- 1730 The history and antiquities of Harwich and Dovercourt, topographical, dynastical and political, London: Davis and Greeh
- 1739 Pharmacologia seu Manuductio ad Materiam Medicam, London: Arnold Langerack
