= Adam Buddle =

English cleric and botanist (1662–1715)

- Born: 1662; Deeping St James, Lincolnshire
- Died: 1715 (aged 52–53); Holborn, London
- Scientific career
- Fields: Botany
- Author abbrev. (botany): Buddle

Adam Buddle (1662 – 15 April 1715) was an English clergyman and botanist. Born at Deeping St James, a village near Peterborough, Buddle was educated at Woodbridge School and St Catharine's College, Cambridge, where he gained a BA in 1681, and a MA four years later. He was a Fellow from 1686 until 1691 when he was ejected as a non-juror but he later conformed.

Buddle was ordained as a deacon in 1685 and priest of the Church of England in December 1702, obtaining a living at North Fambridge, near Maldon, Essex, in 1703. He was also a reader at Gray's Inn under the patronage of Robert Moss. His life between graduation and ordination remains obscure, although it is known he lived in or around Hadleigh, Suffolk, that he established a reputation as an authority on bryophytes, and that he married Elizabeth Eveare in 1695, with whom he had several children. Buddle compiled a new English Flora, completed in 1708, but it was never published; the original manuscript and Buddle's herbarium were preserved as part of the Sloane collection at the Natural History Museum, London.

Buddle died at Gray's Inn in 1715 and was buried at the church of St Andrew, Holborn.

It is popularly believed that Buddle was posthumously commemorated by Linnaeus, who named the genus Buddleja in his honour, but this is not certain.

The standard author abbreviation Buddle is used to indicate this person as the author when citing a botanical name.
