= Leonard Plukenet =

English botanist (1641–1706)

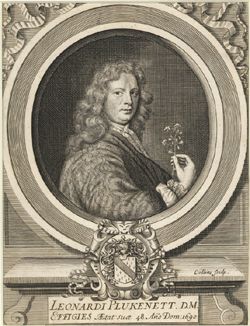
Leonard Plukenet c.1691

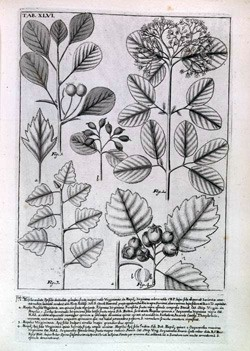
Plate from Phytographia

Leonard Plukenet (1641–1706) was an English botanist, Royal Professor of Botany and gardener to Queen Mary.

== Biography ==
Plukenet published Phytographia (London, 1691–1696) in four parts in which he described and illustrated rare exotic plants. It is a copiously illustrated work of more than 2 700 figures and is frequently cited in books and papers from the 17th century to the present. He collaborated with John Ray in the second volume of Historia Plantarum (London, 1686–1704). The standard author abbreviation Pluk. is used to indicate this person as the author when citing a botanical name.

Paul Dietrich Giseke (1741–1796) compared Plukenet's species with those of Linnaeus in Index Linnaeanus (Hamburg, 1779).

Pluk. mant., refers to the third volume (London, 1700) of the first edition of Historia Plantarum, the whole of which was published 1691–1705.

== Works ==
- Phytographia (in Latin). Vol. 1. London. 1691.
  - Phytographia (in Latin). Vol. 2. London. 1691.
- Almagestum botanicum (in Latin). London. 1696.
- Amaltheum botanicum (in Latin). London. 1705.

== Bibliography ==
- Phytographia, sive Stirpium Illustriorum & minus cognitarum Icones Tabulis Æenis, Summa diligentiâ elaboratœ, pars prior (1690)
- Phytographia, sive Stirpium Illustriorum & minus cognitarum Icones Tabulis Æenis, Summa diligentiâ elaboratœ, pars altera (1691)
- Phytographia, sive Stirpium Illustriorum & minus cognitarum Icones Tabulis Æenis, Summa diligentiâ elaboratœ, pars tertia (1692)
- Phytographia, sive Stirpium Illustriorum & minus cognitarum Icones Tabulis Æenis, Summa diligentiâ elaboratœ, pars quarta (1696)
- Almagestum Botanicum sive Phytographiæ Plukenetianæ Onomasticon Methodo Syntheticâ digestum (1696)
- Almagesti botanici mantissa. Plantarum novissime detectarum ultra millenarium numerum complectens (1700)
- Amaltheum botanicum. stirpium indicarum alterum copiae cornu millenas ad minimum & bis centum diversas species novas & indictas nominatim comprehendens (1705)

== See also ==
- List of florilegia and botanical codices
