= John Ray =

British naturalist (1627–1705)

John Ray FRS
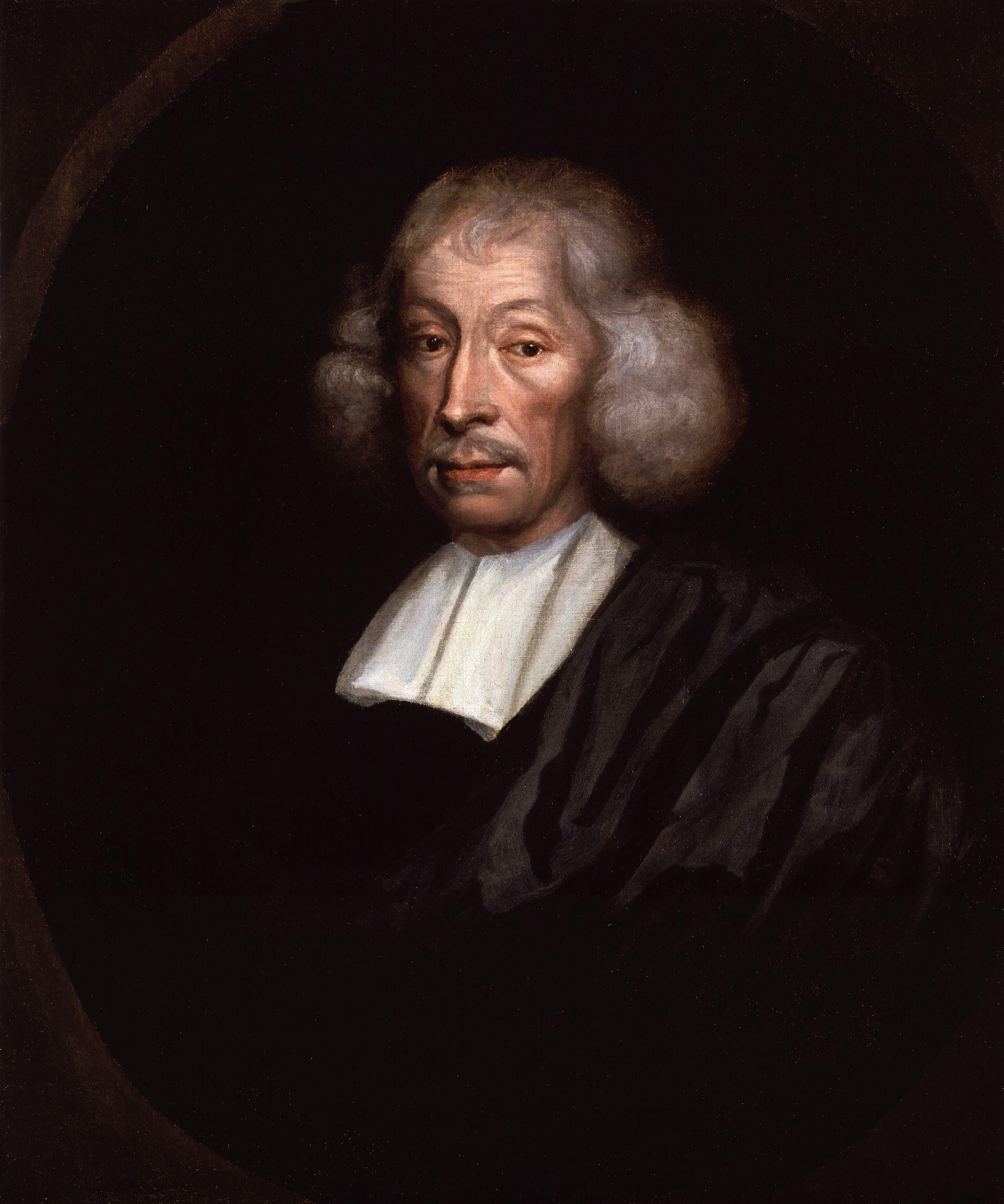
- Born: 29 November 1627; Black Notley, Essex, England
- Died: 17 January 1705 (aged 77); Black Notley, Essex, England
- Education: Trinity College, Cambridge; St Catharine's College, Cambridge
- Scientific career
- Fields: Botany, zoology, natural history, natural theology
- Academic advisors: James Duport
- Author abbrev. (botany): Ray

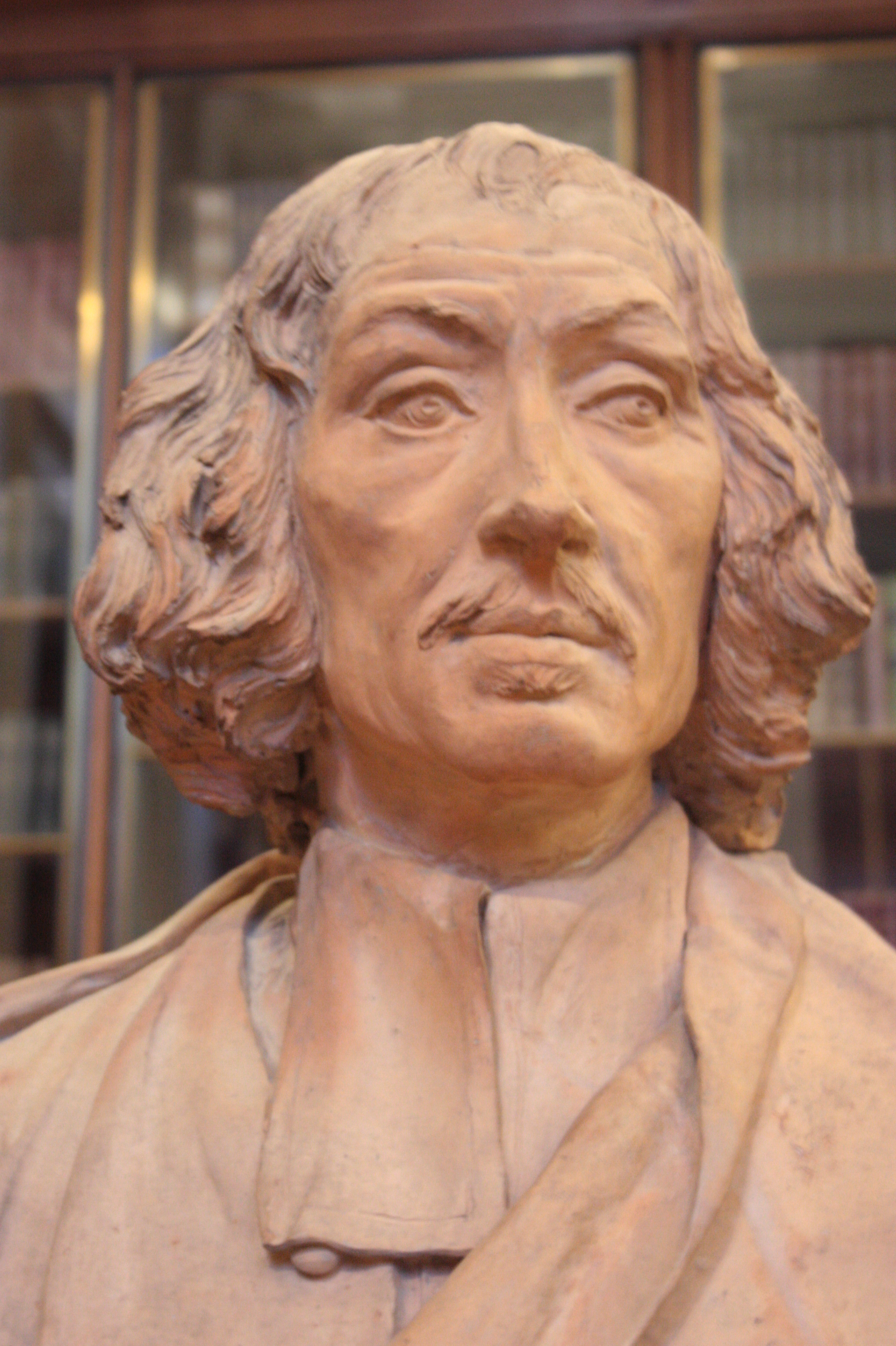
Sculpture of Ray by Louis-François Roubiliac, housed at the British Museum

John Ray (29 November 1627 – 17 January 1705) was an English Christian naturalist and one of the earliest English parson-naturalists. Until 1670 he wrote his name as John Wray; from then on, he used 'Ray', after "having ascertained that such had been the practice of his family before him". He published important works in the fields of botany, zoology and natural theology.

His classification of plants in his Historia Plantarum was an important step towards modern taxonomy. Ray rejected the system of dichotomous division, by which species were classified by repeated sub-division into groups according to a pre-conceived series of characteristics they have or have not, and instead classified plants according to similarities and differences that emerged from observation. He was among the first to attempt a biological definition for the concept of species, as "a group of morphologically similar organisms arising from a common ancestor". Another significant contribution to taxonomy was his division of plants into those with two seedling leaves (dicotyledons) or only one (monocotyledons), a division used in taxonomy today.

== Life ==
=== Early life ===
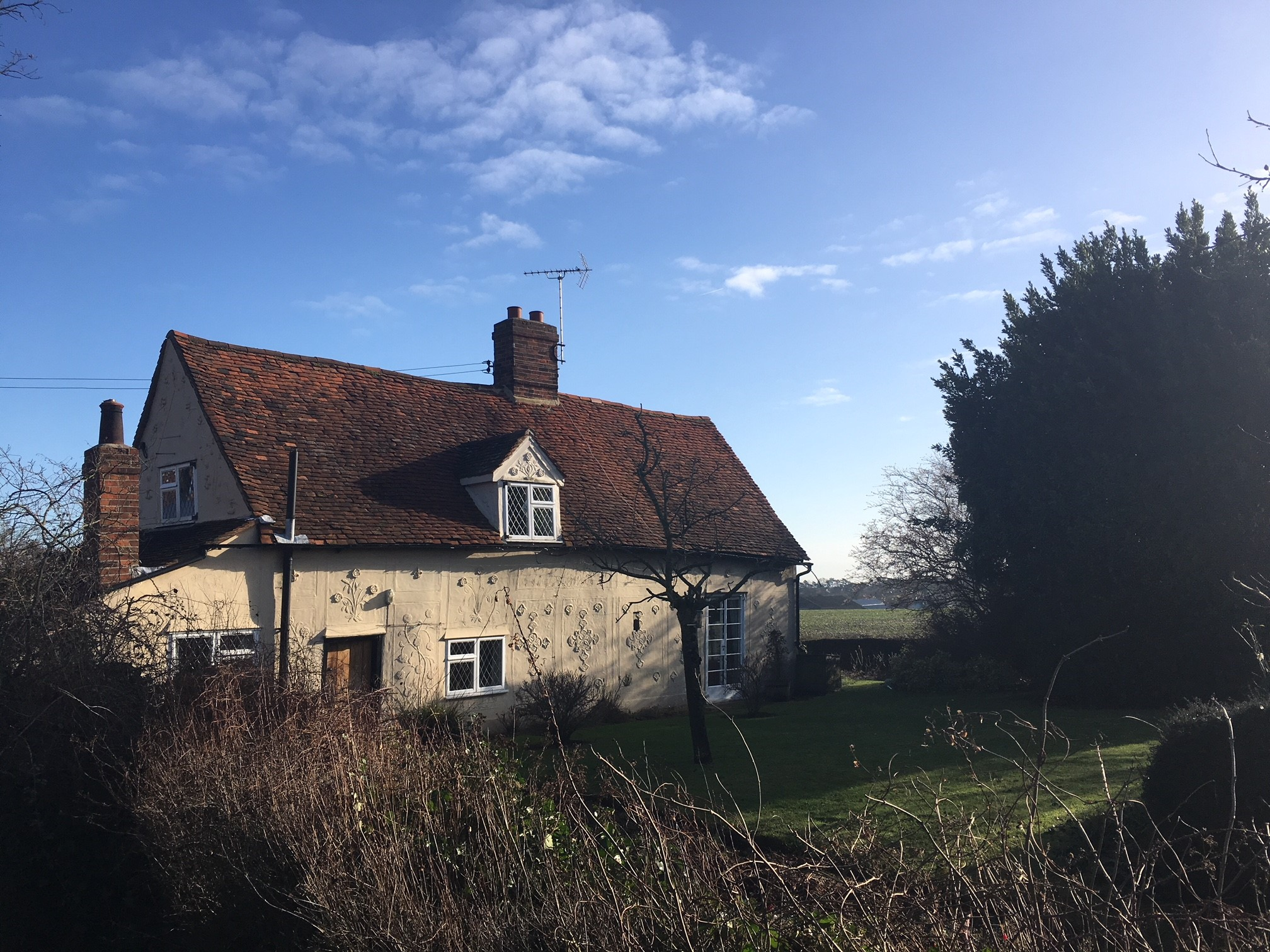
Ray's birthplace in Black Notley, Essex

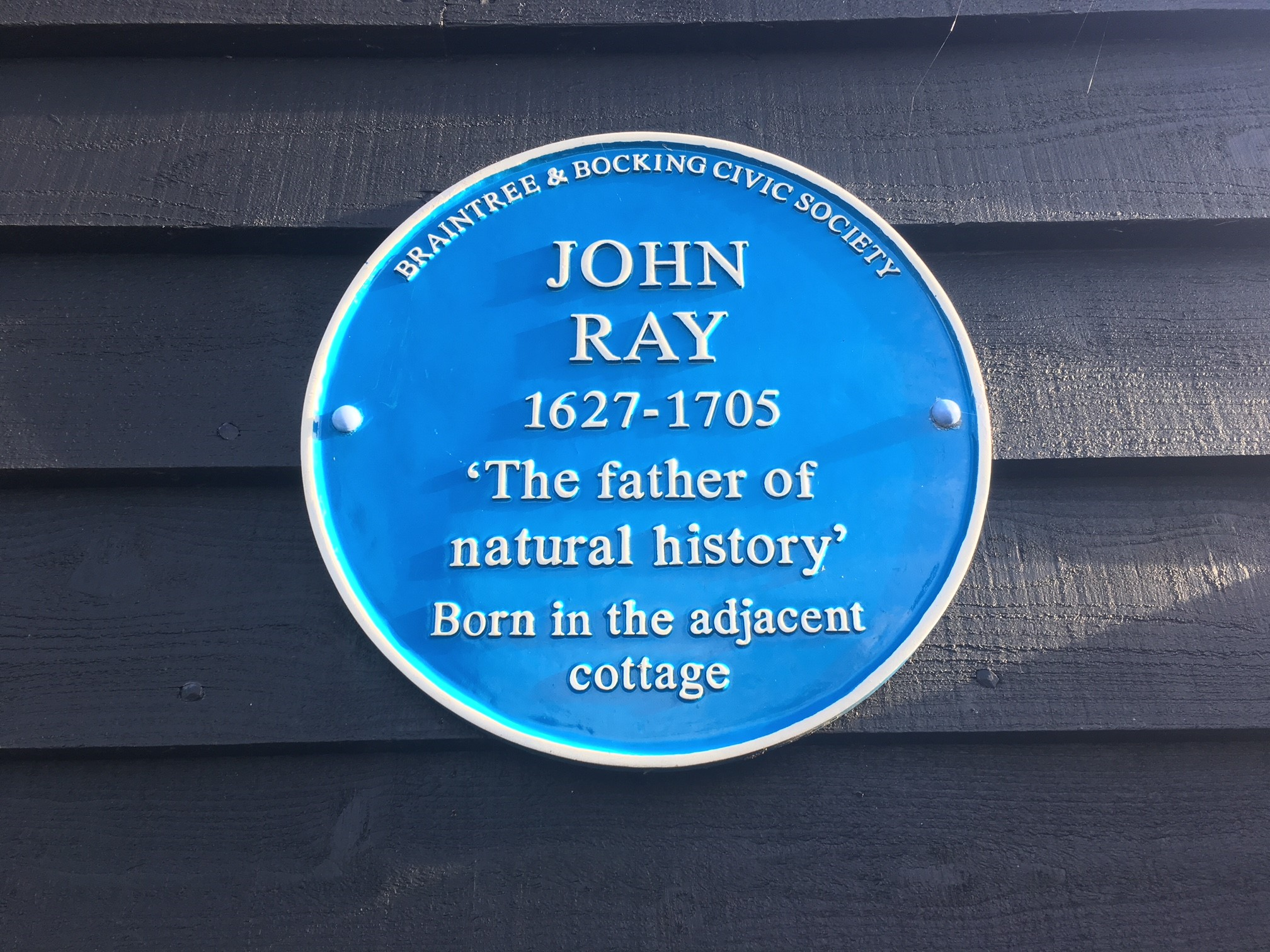
Blue plaque to John Ray

John Ray was born in the village of Black Notley in Essex in the Kingdom of England on 29 November 1627. He is said to have been born in the smithy, his father having been the village blacksmith. After studying at Braintree school, he was sent at the age of sixteen to the University of Cambridge, studying at Trinity College. Initially at Catharine Hall, his tutor was Daniel Duckfield, and later transferred to Trinity, where his tutor was James Duport, and his "intimate friend" and fellow-pupil the celebrated Isaac Barrow. Ray was chosen minor fellow (Note: While still a B.A.) of Trinity in 1649, and later major fellow. (Note: On attaining his M.A.) He held many college offices, becoming successively lecturer in Greek (1651), mathematics (1653), and humanity (1655), praelector (1657), junior dean (1657), and college steward (1659 and 1660); and according to the habit of the time, he was accustomed to preach in his college chapel and also at Great St Mary's, long before he took holy orders on 23 December 1660. Among these sermons were his discourses on The wisdom of God manifested in the works of the creation, and Deluge and Dissolution of the World. Ray was also highly regarded as a tutor and he communicated his own passion for natural history to several pupils. Ray's student, Isaac Barrow, helped Francis Willughby to learn mathematics and Ray collaborated with Willughby later. It was at Trinity that he came under the influence of John Wilkins, when the latter was appointed master of the college in 1659.

=== Later life and family ===
After leaving Cambridge in 1663 he spent some time travelling both in Britain and the continent. In 1673, Ray married Margaret Oakley of Launton in Oxfordshire; in 1676 he went to Middleton Hall near Tamworth, and in 1677 to Falborne (or Faulkbourne) Hall in Essex. Finally, in 1679, he removed to his birthplace at Black Notley, where he afterwards remained. His life there was quiet and uneventful, although he had poor health, including chronic sores. Ray kept writing books and corresponded widely on scientific matters, collaborating with his doctor and contemporary Samuel Dale. He lived, in spite of his infirmities, to the age of seventy-seven, dying at Black Notley. He is buried in the churchyard of St Peter and St Paul, where there is a memorial to him. He is widely regarded as one of the earliest of the English parson-naturalists.

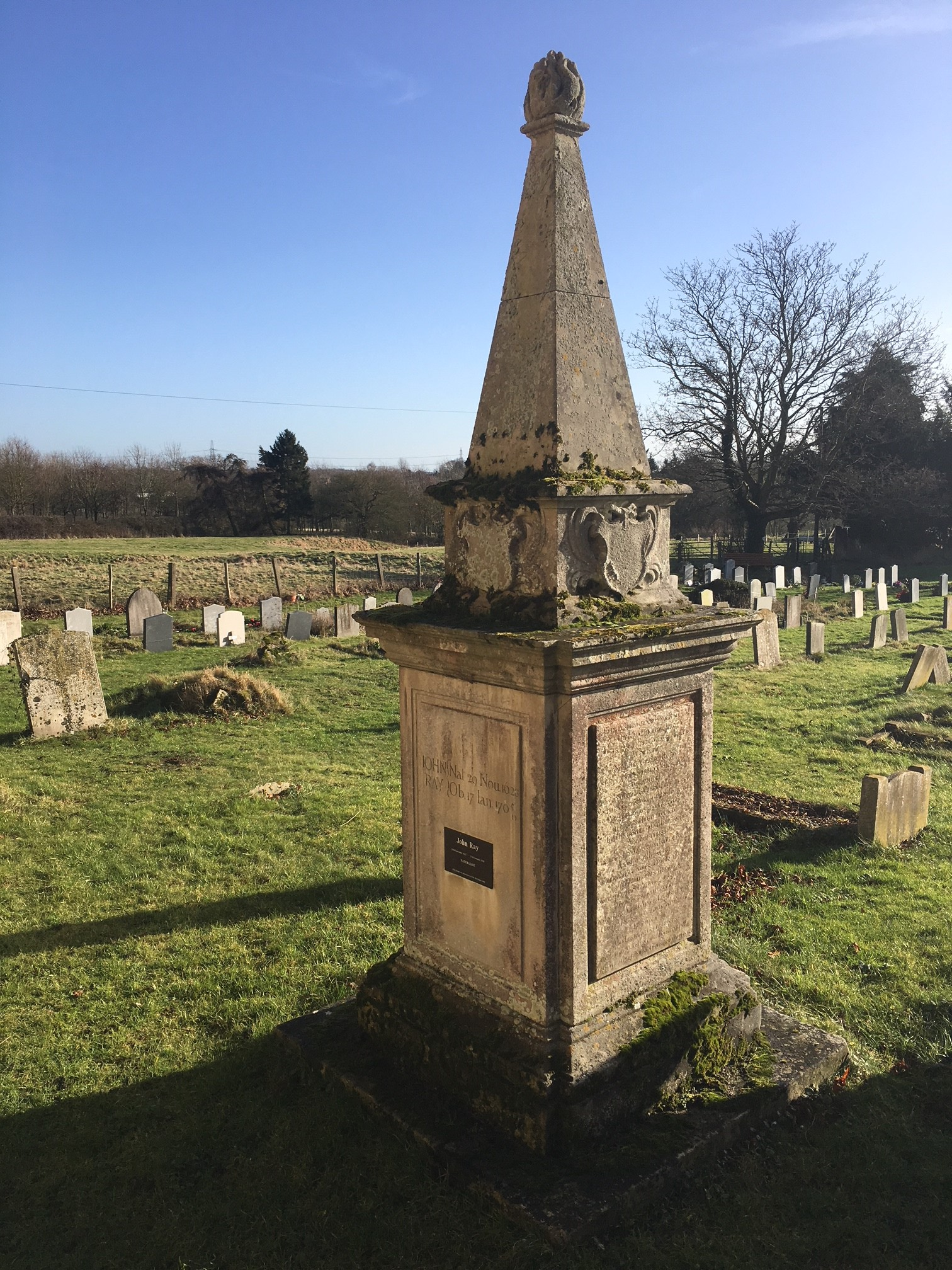
Memorial to John Ray in the churchyard of St Peter and St Paul in Black Notley

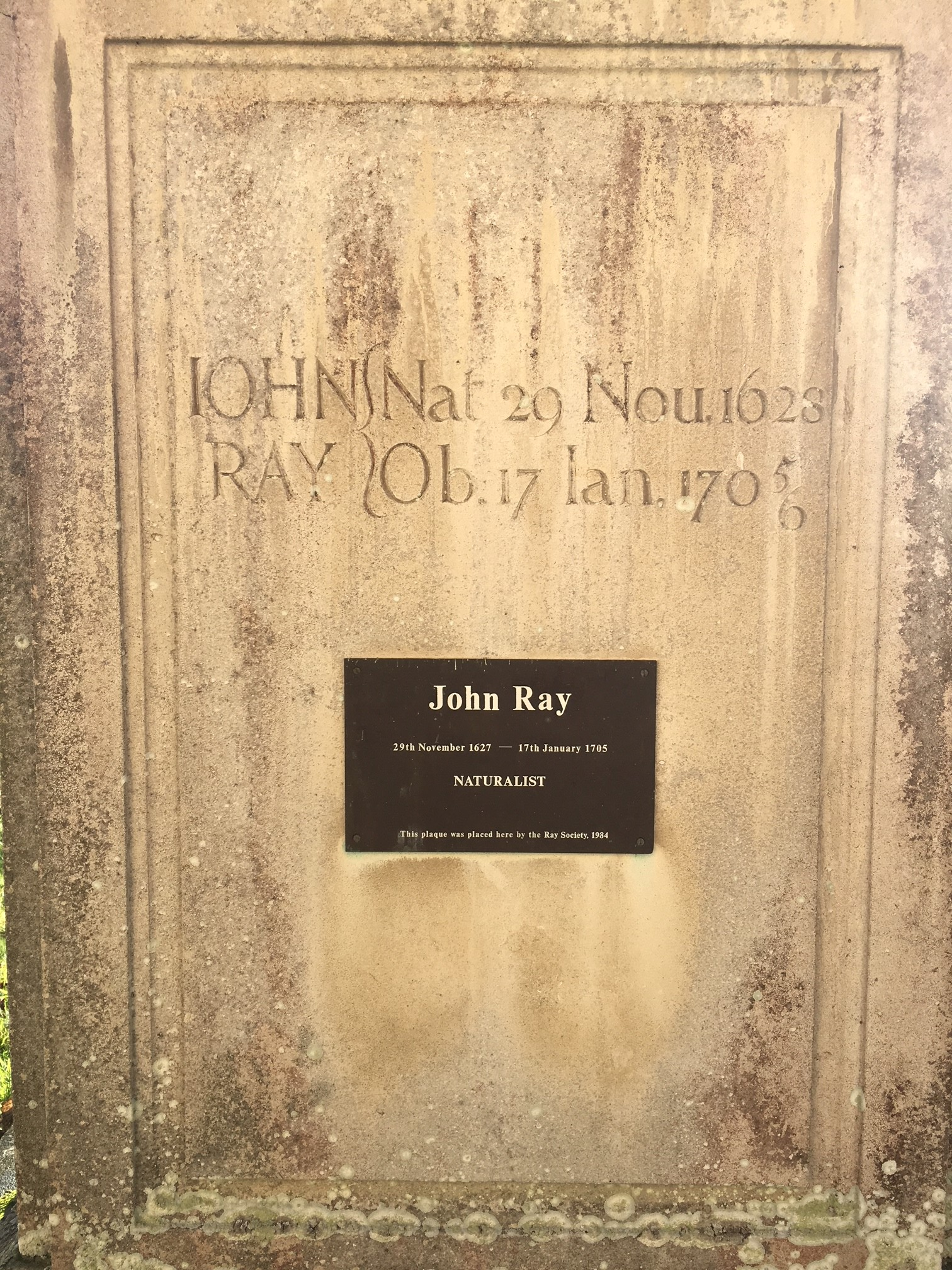
Close-up of memorial to John Ray

== Work ==
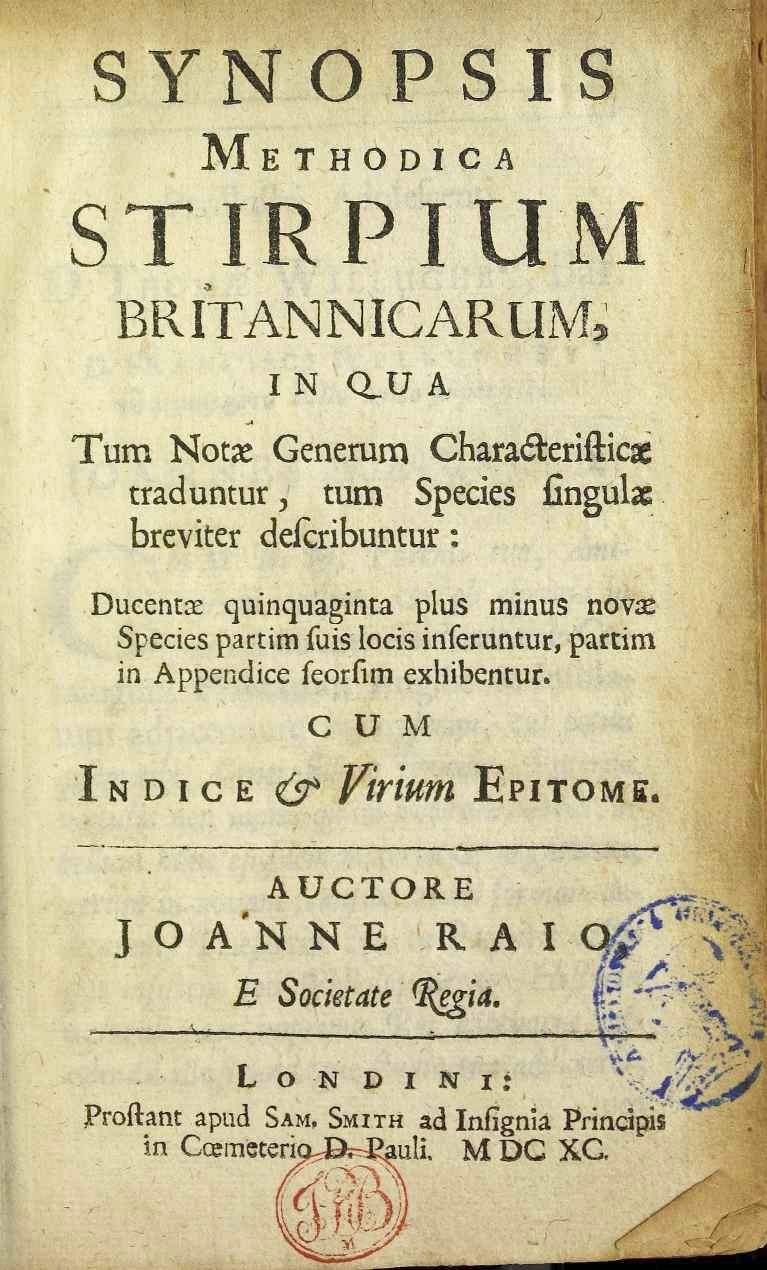
Synopsis methodica stirpium britannicarum, 1690

At Cambridge, Ray spent much of his time in the study of natural history, a subject which would occupy him for most of his life, from 1660 to the beginning of the eighteenth century. When Ray found himself unable to subscribe as required by the Act of Uniformity 1662 he, along with 13 other college fellows, resigned his fellowship on 24 August 1662 rather than swear to the declaration that the Solemn League and Covenant was not binding on those who had taken it. Tobias Smollett quoted the reasoning given in the biography of Ray by William Derham:

The reason of his refusal was not (says his biographer) as some have imagined, his having taken the solemn league and covenant; for that he never did, and often declared that he ever thought it an unlawful oath: but he said he could not say, for those that had taken the oath, that no obligation lay upon them, but feared there might."

His religious views were generally in accord with those imposed under the restoration of Charles II of England, and (though technically a nonconformist) he continued as a layman in the Established Church of England.

From this time onwards he seems to have depended chiefly on the bounty of his pupil Francis Willughby, who made Ray his constant companion while he lived. They travelled extensively, carrying out field observations and collecting specimens of botany, ornithology, ichthyology, mammals, reptiles and insects. Initially they agreed that Ray would take responsibility for the plants, and Willughby for birds, beasts, fishes, and insects. Willughby arranged that after his death, Ray would have 6 shillings a year for educating Willughby's two sons.

In the spring of 1663 Ray started together with Willughby and two other pupils (Philip Skippon and Nathaniel Bacon) on a tour through Europe, from which he returned in March 1666, parting from Willughby at Montpellier, whence the latter continued his journey into Spain. He had previously in three different journeys (1658, 1661, 1662) travelled through the greater part of Great Britain, and selections from his private notes of these journeys were edited by George Scott in 1760, under the title of Mr Ray's Itineraries. Ray himself published an account of his foreign travel in 1673, entitled Observations topographical, moral, and physiological, made on a Journey through part of the Low Countries, Germany, Italy, and France. From this tour Ray and Willughby returned laden with collections, on which they meant to base complete systematic descriptions of the animal and vegetable kingdoms.

In 1667 Ray was elected Fellow of the Royal Society, and in 1669 he and Willughby published a paper on Experiments concerning the Motion of Sap in Trees. In 1671 he presented the research of Francis Jessop on formic acid to the Royal Society.

Following Willughby's death in 1672, Ray took on the responsibility of bringing both Willughby's work and his own to publication. Ray was left with an ornithology and ichthyology to edit as well as his own work dealing with mammals, reptiles and insects. Although he presented the Ornithologia (1676) as Willughby's, he made extensive contributions to the work. His task became more difficult after the death of Lady Cassandra, Willughby's mother, on July 25, 1675. Lady Cassandra had supported Ray's continued work, but the widow Willughby had no interest in her late husband's scientific interests or his scientific friends. Ray was no longer allowed to instruct the children, and Ray and his wife Margaret Oakley were forced to leave the Willughby household in Middleton. Critically, Ray lost access to the Willughby collections, notes and manuscripts at this time. The plants gathered on his British tours had already been described in his Catalogus plantarum Angliae (1670), which formed the basis for later English floras. He had likely already used the botanical collections to lay much of the groundwork of his Methodus plantarum nova (1682). His great Historia generalis plantarum appeared in 3 volumes in 1686, 1688 and 1704.

In the 1690s he published three volumes on religion—the most popular being The Wisdom of God Manifested in the Works of the Creation (1691), an essay describing evidence that all in nature and space is God's creation as in the Bible is affirmed. In this volume, he moved on from the naming and cataloguing of species like his successor Carl Linnaeus. Instead, Ray considered species' lives and how nature worked as a whole, giving facts that are arguments for God's will expressed in his creation of all 'visible and invisible' (Colossians 1:16). Ray gave an early description of dendrochronology, explaining how to find the ash tree's age from its tree-rings.

=== Taxonomy ===
Ray's work on plant taxonomy spanned a wide range of thought, starting with an approach that was predominantly in the tradition of the herbalists and Aristotelian, but becoming increasingly theoretical and finally rejecting Aristotelianism. Despite his early adherence to Aristotelian tradition, his first botanical work, the Catalogus plantarum circa Cantabrigiam nascentium (1660), was almost entirely descriptive, being arranged alphabetically. His model was an account by Bauhin of the plants growing around Basel in 1622 and was the first English county flora, covering about 630 species. However at the end of the work he appended a brief taxonomy which he stated followed the usage of Bauhin and other herbalists.

==== System of classification ====
Ray's system, starting with his Cambridge catalogue, began with the division between the imperfect or lower plants (Cryptogams), and perfect (planta perfecta) higher plants (Seed plants). The latter he divided by life forms, e.g. trees (arbores), shrubs (frutices), subshrubs (suffrutices) and herbaceous plants (herbae) and lastly grouping them by common characteristics. The trees he divided into 8 groups, e.g. Pomiferae (including apple and pear). The shrubs he placed in 2 groups, Spinosi (Berberis etc.) and Non Spinosi (Jasmine etc.). The subshrubs formed a single group and the herbs into 21 groups.

Division of Herbae;

1. Bulbosae (Lilium etc.)
2. Tuberosae (Asphodelus etc.)
3. Umbelliferae (Foeniculum etc.)
4. Verticellatae (Mentha etc.)
5. Spicatae (Lysimachia etc.)
6. Scandentes (Cucurbita etc.)
7. Corymbiferae (Tanacetum)
8. Pappiflorae (Senecio etc.)
9. Capitatae (Scabiosa etc.)
10. Campaniformes (Digitalis etc.)
11. Coronariae (Caryophyllus etc.)
12. Rotundifoliae (Cyclamen etc.)
13. Nervifoliae (Plantago etc.)
14. Stellatae (Rubia etc.)
15. Cerealia (Legumina etc.)
16. Succulentae (Sedum etc.)
17. Graminifoliae (Gramina etc.)
18. [omitted]
19. Oleraceae (Beta etc.)
20. Aquaticae (Nymphaea etc.)
21. Marinae (Fucus etc.)
22. Saxatiles (Asplenium etc)

As outlined in his Historia Plantarum (1685–1703):

- Herbae (Herbaceous plants)
  - Imperfectae (Cryptogams)
  - Perfectae (Seed plants)
    - Monocotyledons
    - Dicotyledons
- Arborae (Trees)
  - Monocotyledons
  - Dicotyledons

==== Definition of species ====
Ray was the first person to produce a biological definition of species, in his 1686 History of Plants:

... no surer criterion for determining species has occurred to me than the distinguishing features that perpetuate themselves in propagation from seed. Thus, no matter what variations occur in the individuals or the species, if they spring from the seed of one and the same plant, they are accidental variations and not such as to distinguish a species... Animals likewise that differ specifically preserve their distinct species permanently; one species never springs from the seed of another nor vice versa.

=== Publications ===
Ray published about 23 works, depending on how they are counted. The biological works were usually in Latin, the rest in English. His first publication, while at Cambridge, was the Catalogus plantarum circa Cantabrigiam nascentium (1660), followed by many works, botanical, zoological, theological and literary. Until 1670 he wrote his name as John Wray. From then on, he used 'Ray', after "having ascertained that such had been the practice of his family before him".

==== List of selected publications ====
- Ray, John (1660). Catalogus plantarum circa Cantabrigiam nascentium ...: Adiiciuntur in gratiam tyronum, index Anglico-latinus, index locorum ... [Catalogue of Cambridge plants] (in Latin). Cambridge: John Field. Appendices 1663, 1685
  - Ray, John (1975). Catalogus Plantarum Circa Cantabrigiam Nascentium [Ray's Flora of Cambridgeshire]. trans. Ewen & Prime. Wheldon and Wesley. ISBN 978-0-85486-090-6.
  - Ray, John (2011). John Ray's Cambridge Catalogue (1660). trans. Oswald and Preston. Ray Society. ISBN 978-0-903874-43-4.
- 1668: Tables of plants, in John Wilkins' Essay
- Ray, John (1677) [1668]. Catalogus plantarum Angliae, et insularum adjacentium: tum indigenas, tum in agris passim cultas complectens. In quo praeter synonyma necessaria, facultates quoque summatim traduntur, unà cum observationibus & experimentis novis medicis & physics [Catalogue of English plants] (in Latin) (2nd ed.). London: A Clark.
- 1670: Collection of English proverbs.
- 1673: Observations in the Low Countries and Catalogue of plants not native to England.
- 1674: Collection of English words not generally used.online
- 1675: Trilingual dictionary, or nomenclator classicus.
- 1676: Willughby's Ornithologia. (Note: "In fact, the book was Ray's, based on preliminary notes by Francis Willughby".^{p52}^{Chapter 12} "Willughby and Ray laid the foundation of scientific ornithology".)
- Ray, John (1682). Methodus plantarum nova: brevitatis & perspicuitatis causa synoptice in tabulis exhibita, cum notis generum tum summorum tum subalternorum characteristicis, observationibus nonnullis de seminibus plantarum & indice copioso [New method of plants] (in Latin). London: Faithorne & Kersey.
  - English translation by Stephen Nimis
- 1686: History of fishes. (Note: Plates subscribed by Fellows of the Royal Society. Samuel Pepys, the President, subscribed for 79 of the plates.)
- 1686–1704: Historia plantarum species [History of plants]. London:Clark 3 vols;
  - Vol 1 1686, Vol 2 1688, Vol 3 1704 (in Latin) (Note: The third volume lacked plates, so his assistant James Petiver published Petiver's Catalogue in parts, 1715–1764, with plates. The work on the first two volumes was supported by subscriptions from the President and Fellows of the Royal Society)
  - Lazenby, Elizabeth Mary (1995). The Historia Plantarum Generalis of John Ray, Book I : a translation and commentary. PhD thesis Newcastle University
- Ray, John (1690). Synopsis methodica stirpium Britannicarum: in qua tum notae generum characteristicae traduntur, tum species singulae breviter describuntur: ducentae quinquaginta plus minus novae species partim suis locis inseruntur, partim in appendice seorsim exhibentur : cum indice & virium epitome [Synopsis of British plants] (in Latin). London: Sam. Smith.
  - 2nd edition 1696
- 1691: The wisdom of God Manifested in the Works of the Creation 7th ed. Archived 7 August 2015 at the Wayback Machine 2nd edition 1692, 3rd edition 1701, 4th edition 1704, 7th edition 1717 (Note: 7th edition Printed by R. Harbin, for William Innys, at the Prince’s-Arms in St Paul’s Church Yard, London 1717. Each edition enlarged from the previous edition. This was his most popular work. It was in the vein later called natural theology, explaining the adaptation of living creatures as the work of God. It was heavily plagiarised by William Paley in his Natural theology of 1802.^{p92}^{p452})
- 1692: Miscellaneous discourses concerning the dissolution and changes of the world (Note: This includes some important discussion of fossils. Ray insisted that fossils had once been alive, in opposition to his friends Martin Lister and Edward Llwyd. "These [fossils] were originally the shells and bones of living fishes and other animals bred in the sea". Raven commented that this was "The fullest and most enlightened treatment by an Englishman" of that time.^{p426})
- 1693: Synopsis of animals and reptiles.
- 1693: Collection of travels.
- 1694: Collection of European plants.
- 1695: Plants of each county. (Camden's Britannia)
- Ray, John (1696). De Variis Plantarum Methodis Dissertatio Brevis [Brief dissertation] (in Latin). London: Smith & Walford.
  - English translation by Stephen Nimis
- 1700: A persuasive to a holy life.
- Ray, John (1703). Methodus plantarum emendata et aucta: In quãa notae maxime characteristicae exhibentur, quibus stirpium genera tum summa, tum infima cognoscuntur & áa se mutuo dignoscuntur, non necessariis omissis. Accedit methodus graminum, juncorum et cyperorum specialis (in Latin). London: Smith & Walford.

Posthumous

- 1705. Method and history of insects
- 1713: Synopsis methodica avium & piscium: opus posthumum (Synopsis of birds and fishes), in Latin. William Innys, London vol. 1: Avium vol. 2: Piscium
- 1713 Three Physico-theological discourses (Note: This is the 3rd edition of Miscellaneous discourses, the last by Ray before his death, and delayed in publication. Its main importance is that Ray recanted his former acceptance of fossils, apparently because he was theologically troubled by the implications of extinction.^{p37} Robert Hooke, like Nicolas Steno, was in no doubt about the biological origin of fossils. Hooke made the point that some fossils were no longer living, for example Ammonites: this was the source of Ray's concern.^{p327})
- Ray, John (1724) [1690]. Dillenius, Johann Jacob (ed.). Synopsis methodica stirpium Britannicarum: in qua tum notae generum characteristicae traduntur, tum species singulae breviter describuntur: ducentae quinquaginta plus minus novae species partim suis locis inseruntur, partim in appendice seorsim exhibentur: cum indice & virium epitome (editio tertia multis locis emendata, & quadringentis quinquaginta circiter speciebus noviter detectis aucta ) [Synopsis of British plants] (in Latin) (3rd ed.). London: Gulielmi & Joaniis Innys.
  - Facsimile edition 197, Ray Society, London. With introduction by William T. Stearn. ISBN 978-0-903874-00-7
  - Fourth edition 1760

==== Libraries holding Ray's works ====
Including the various editions, there are 172 works of Ray, of which most are rare. The only libraries with substantial holdings are all in England.^{p153} The list in order of holdings is:

The British Library, Euston, London. Holds over 80 of the editions.
The Bodleian Library, University of Oxford.
The University of Cambridge Library.
Library of Trinity College, Cambridge.
The Natural History Museum Library, South Kensington, London.
The John Rylands Library, University of Manchester, Deansgate, Manchester

== Legacy ==
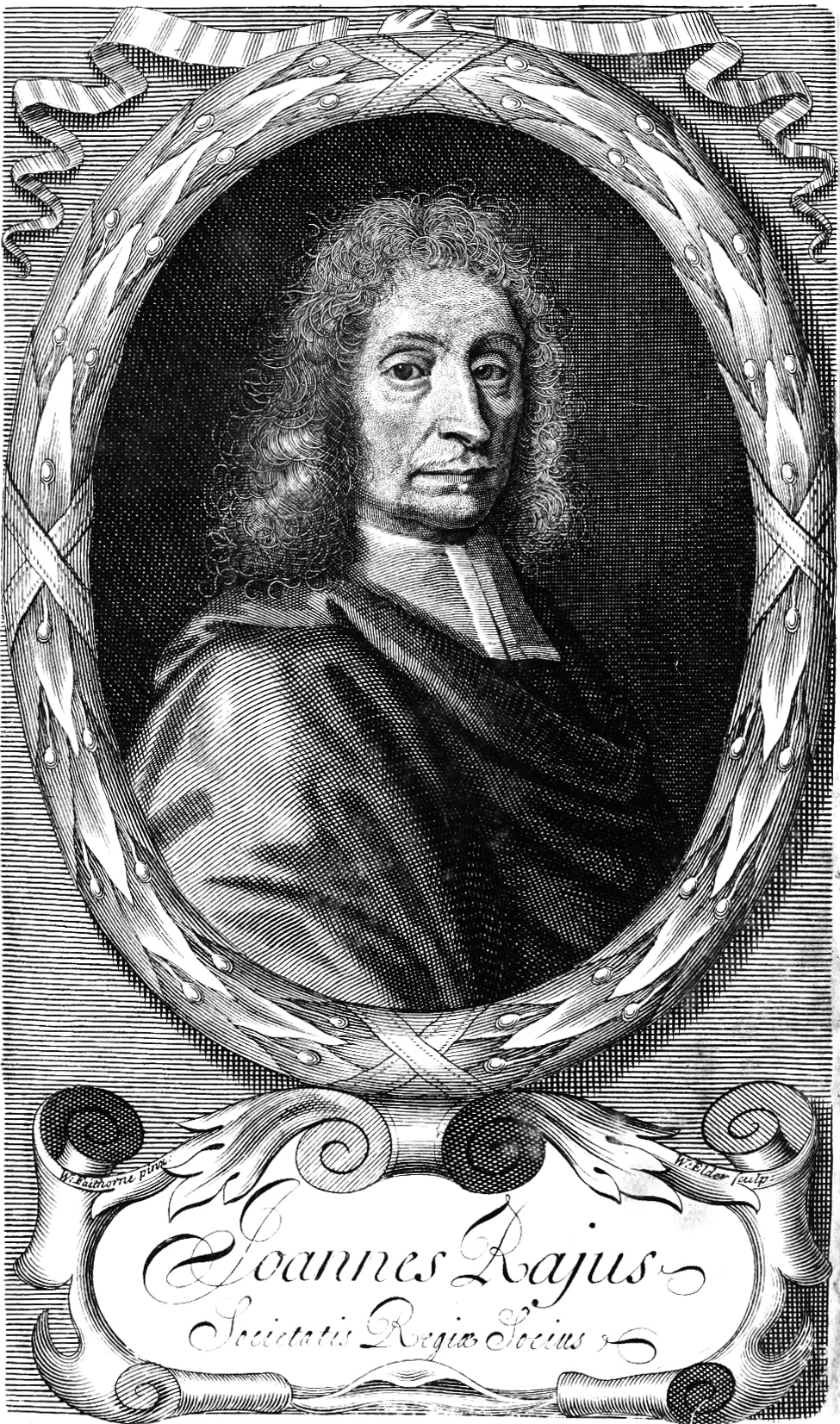
Woodcut (1693)

Ray's biographer, Charles Raven, commented that "Ray sweeps away the litter of mythology and fable... and always insists upon accuracy of observation and description and the testing of every new discovery".^{p10} Ray's works were directly influential on the development of taxonomy by Carl Linnaeus.

The Ray Society, named after John Ray, was founded in 1844. It is a scientific text publication society and registered charity, based at the Natural History Museum, London, which exists to publish books on natural history, with particular (but not exclusive) reference to the flora and fauna of the British Isles. As of 2017, the Society had published 179 volumes.

The John Ray Society (a separate organisation) is the Natural Sciences Society at St Catharine's College, Cambridge. It organises a programme of events of interest to science students in the college.

In 1986, to mark the 300th anniversary of the publication of Ray's Historia Plantarum, there was a celebration of Ray's legacy in Braintree, Essex. A "John Ray Gallery" was opened in the Braintree Museum.

The John Ray Initiative (JRI) is an educational charity that seeks to reconcile scientific and Christian understandings of the environment. It was formed in 1997 in response to the global environmental crisis and the challenges of sustainable development and environmental stewardship. John Ray's writings proclaimed God as creator whose wisdom is "manifest in the works of creation", and as redeemer of all things. JRI aims to teach appreciation of nature, increase awareness of the state of the global environment, and to promote a Christian understanding of environmental issues.

The John Ray Walk, a 9-mile (14.4 km) footpath following the valley of the River Brain in Essex, was set up in memory of Ray in 2000.

In 2026, Trinity College gardeners recreated Ray's garden on the college's front lawn for his 400th anniversary in 2027, based on Ray's written records and using an engraving from 1690 to establish the site.

== See also ==
- Monocotyledons

== Bibliography ==
=== Books ===
- Armstrong, Patrick (2000). The English Parson-naturalist: A Companionship Between Science and Religion. Gracewing Publishing. ISBN 978-0-85244-516-7.
- Birch, Thomas, ed. (1757). The History of the Royal Society of London for Improving of Natural Knowledge from Its First Rise, in which the Most Considerable of Those Papers Communicated to the Society, which Have Hitherto Not Been Published, are Inserted as a Supplement to the Philosophical Transactions, Volume 3. London: Millar.
- Gunther, R.W.T., ed. (1928). Further Correspondence of John Ray. Ray Society.
- Lankester, Edwin, ed. (1848). The Correspondence of John Ray: Consisting of Selections from the Philosophical Letters Published by Dr. Derham, and Original Letters of John Ray in the Collection of the British Museum. London: Ray Society. (also here at Biodiversity Heritage Library)
- Oliver, Francis W., ed. (1913). Makers of British Botany. Cambridge: Cambridge University Press.
- Pavord, Anna (2005). The naming of names the search for order in the world of plants. New York: Bloomsbury. ISBN 9781596919655. See also ebook 2010
- Raven, Charles E. (1950) [1942]. John Ray, naturalist: his life and works (2nd ed.). Cambridge [England]: Cambridge University Press. ISBN 9780521310833.
- Raven, Charles E. (1947). English naturalists from Neckham to Ray: a study of the making if the modern world. Cambridge: Cambridge University Press. ISBN 9781108016346.
- Sachs, Julius von (1890) [1875]. Geschichte der Botanik vom 16. Jahrhundert bis 1860 [History of botany (1530-1860)]. translated by Henry E. F. Garnsey, revised by Isaac Bayley Balfour. Oxford: Oxford University Press. doi:10.5962/bhl.title.30585., see also History of botany (1530-1860) at Google Books
- Singh, Gurcharan (2004). Plant Systematics: An Integrated Approach (3 ed.). Science Publishers. ISBN 1578083516.
- Slaughter, M. M. (1982). Universal Languages and Scientific Taxonomy in the Seventeenth Century. Cambridge University Press. ISBN 978-0-521-24477-0.
- This article incorporates text from a publication now in the public domain: Thompson, D'Arcy Wentworth (1911). "Ray, John". In Chisholm, Hugh (ed.). Encyclopædia Britannica. Vol. 22 (11th ed.). Cambridge University Press. pp. 931–932.
- Vines, Sydney Howard. Robert Morison 1620–1683 and John Ray 1627–1705. pp. 8–43., in Oliver (1913)

=== Articles ===
- Jarvis, Charlie (December 2012). "John Ray's Cambridge Catalogue (1660) translated and edited by P.H.Oswald and C.D.Preston. London: The Ray Society. 2011. ix + 612 pp. Hardback. ISBN 978-0903874-43-4. £80". Botanical Journal of the Linnean Society. 170 (4): 640–641. doi:10.1111/j.1095-8339.2012.01316.x.
- Thompson, Roger (July 1974). "Some newly discovered letters of John Ray". Journal of the Society for the Bibliography of Natural History. 7 (1): 111–123. doi:10.3366/jsbnh.1974.7.1.111.

=== Websites ===
- "The Ray Society"., see also Ray Society
- John Ray's works at the Biodiversity Heritage Library
