= William Cocke (disambiguation) =

William Cocke (1748–1828) was an American pioneer, state legislator, and U.S. senator.

William Cocke may also refer to:

- W. A. Cocke (1796–1844), American politician
- William Michael Cocke (1815–1896), American politician
- William A. Cocke (1822–1887), American attorney and politician
- William Cocke (politician) (1672–1720), American politician
