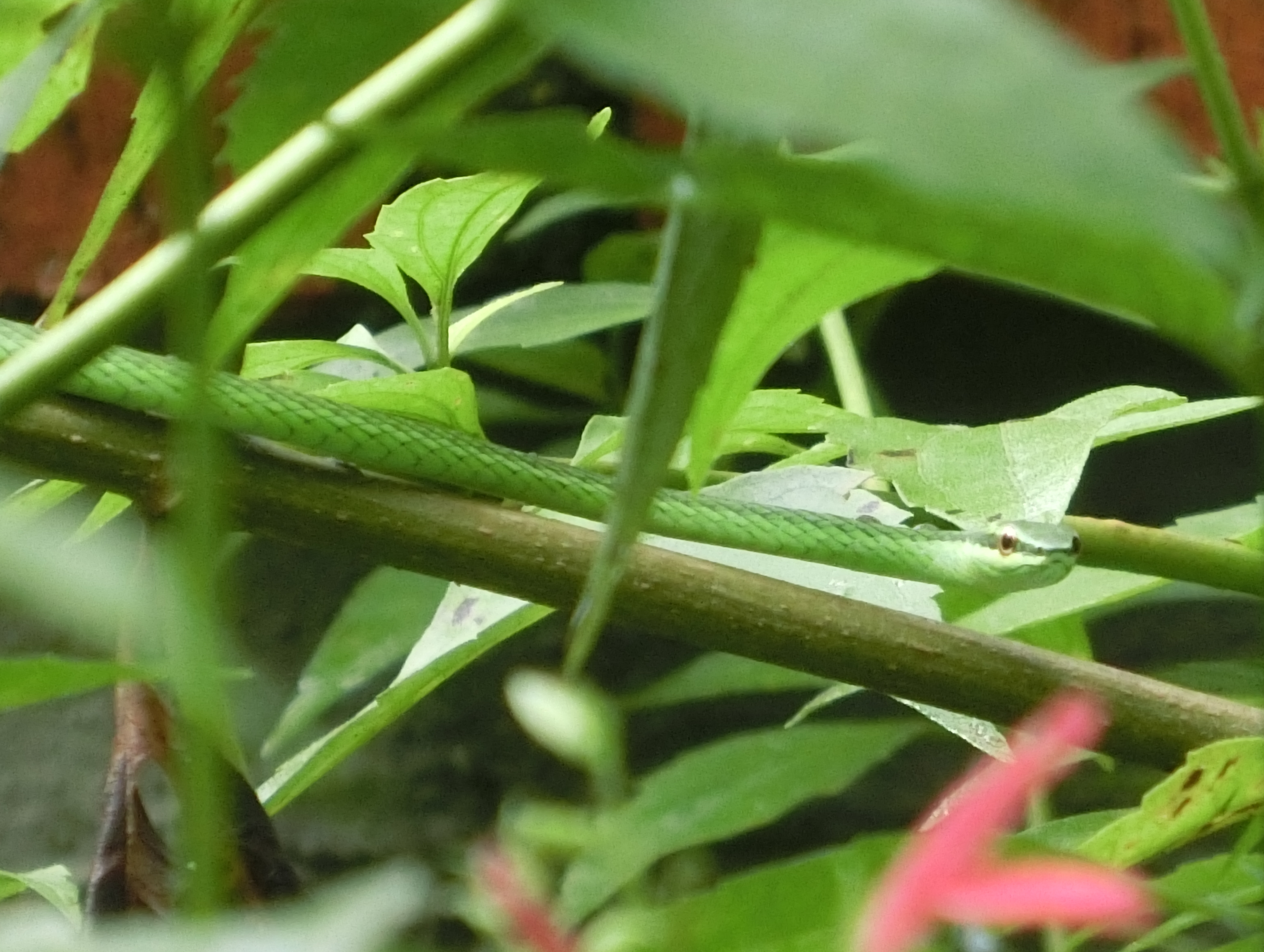

Conservation status
- Least Concern (IUCN 3.1)

Scientific classification
- Kingdom: Animalia
- Phylum: Chordata
- Class: Reptilia
- Order: Squamata
- Suborder: Serpentes
- Family: Colubridae
- Genus: Uromacer
- Species: U. catesbyi

Binomial name
- Uromacer catesbyi (Schlegel, 1837)

Synonyms
- Dendrophis catesbyi Schlegel, 1837; Uromacer catesbyi — A.M.C. Duméril, Bibron & A.H.A. Duméril, 1854

= Uromacer catesbyi =

Species of snake

Uromacer catesbyi, also known commonly as the blunt-headed Hispaniolan vine snake and Catesby's pointed snake, is a species of snake in the family Colubridae. The species is endemic to the island of Hispaniola.

== Etymology ==
The specific name, catesbyi, is in honor of English naturalist Mark Catesby.

== Geographic range ==
U. catesbyi is native to the Dominican Republic and Haiti.

== Habitat ==
Although the preferred natural habitat of U. catesbyi is forest at altitudes from sea level to 1,300 m (4,270 ft), it is also often found in disturbed areas.

== Behavior ==
U. catesbyi is an arboreal species.

== Diet ==
U. catesbyi preys upon frogs (such as Osteopilus), lizards (such as Anolis), and birds (such as Coereba flaveola).

== Reproduction ==
U. catesbyi is oviparous.

== Subspecies ==
Including the nominotypical subspecies, eight subspecies are recognized as being valid.

- Uromacer catesbyi catesbyi (Schlegel, 1837)
- Uromacer catesbyi cereolineatus Schwartz, 1970
- Uromacer catesbyi frondicolor Schwartz, 1970
- Uromacer catesbyi hariolatus Schwartz, 1970
- Uromacer catesbyi inchausteguii Schwartz, 1970
- Uromacer catesbyi insulaevaccarum Schwartz, 1970
- Uromacer catesbyi pampineus Schwartz, 1970
- Uromacer catesbyi scandax Dunn, 1920

Nota bene: A binomial authority or trinomial authority in parentheses indicates that the species or subspecies was originally described in a genus other than Uromacer.
