= Uromacer frenatus =

Conservation status
- Near Threatened (IUCN 3.1)

Scientific classification
- Kingdom: Animalia
- Phylum: Chordata
- Class: Reptilia
- Order: Squamata
- Suborder: Serpentes
- Family: Colubridae
- Genus: Uromacer
- Species: U. frenatus

Binomial name
- Uromacer frenatus (Günther, 1865)

Synonyms
- Ahaetulla frenata Günther, 1865; Uromacer inornatus Garman, 1887; Uromacer frenatus — Boulenger, 1893

Species of snake

Uromacer frenatus, the slender Hispaniolan vine snake or island pointed snake, is a species of snake in the family Colubridae. The species is endemic to Hispaniola in the West Indies.

== Geographic range ==
U. frenatus is found in Haiti and the Dominican Republic.

== Habitat ==
The preferred natural habitat of U. frenatus is forest at altitudes from sea level to 929 m (3,048 ft).

== Reproduction ==
U. frenatus is oviparous.

== Subspecies ==
Four subspecies are recognized as being valid, including the nominotypical subspecies.

- Uromacer frenatus chlorauges Schwartz, 1976
- Uromacer frenatus dorsalis Dunn, 1920
- Uromacer frenatus frenatus (Günther, 1865)
- Uromacer frenatus wetmorei Cochran, 1931

Nota bene: A trinomial authority in parentheses indicates that the subspecies was originally described in a genus other than Uromacer.

== Etymology ==
The subspecific name, wetmorei, is in honor of American ornithologist Alexander Wetmore.
