= Alexander Wetmore =

American ornithologist and avian paleontologist (1886–1978)

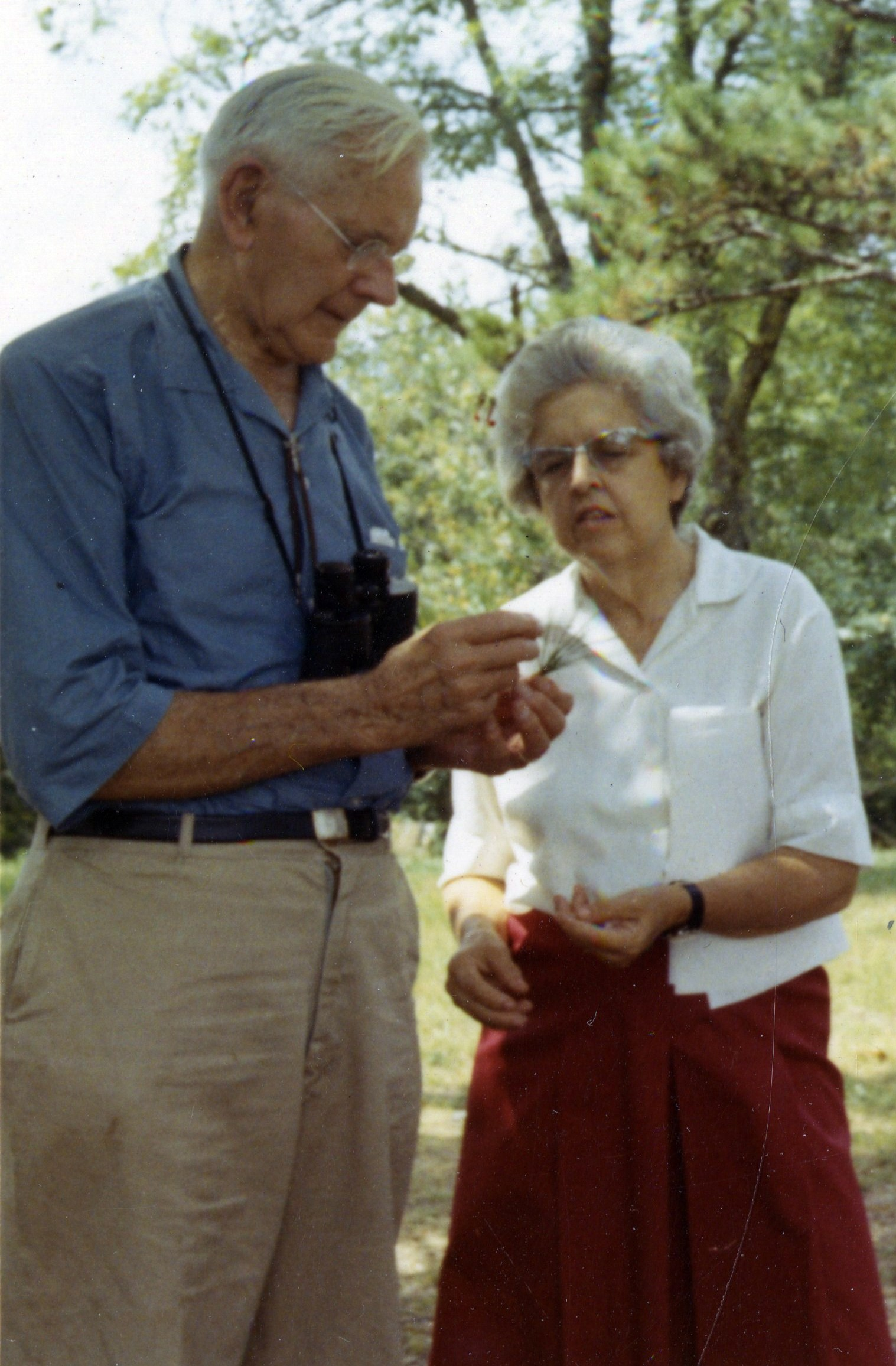
- Wetmore with his wife Beatrice, 1969

6th Secretary of the Smithsonian Institution
- In office 1945–1952
- Preceded by: Charles Greeley Abbot
- Succeeded by: Leonard Carmichael

Personal details
- Born: June 18, 1886 North Freedom, Wisconsin, U.S.
- Died: December 7, 1978 (aged 92) Glen Echo, Maryland, U.S.
- Education: University of Kansas (BA); George Washington University (MA, PhD)
- Known for: Systematic Classification for the Birds of the World (1930, revised in 1951[9] and 1960)
- Scientific career
- Spouse: Annie Beatrice van der Biest Thielan Wetmore
- Fields: ornithology and paleontology
- Institutions: Department of Agriculture; Smithsonian Institution
- Thesis: A study of the body temperature of birds (1920)
- Author abbrev. (zoology): Wetmore

Frank Alexander Wetmore (June 18, 1886 – December 7, 1978) was an American ornithologist and avian paleontologist. He was the sixth Secretary of the Smithsonian Institution. He was also an elected member of both the American Philosophical Society and the United States National Academy of Sciences.

== Early life and education ==
The son of a physician, Frank Alexander Wetmore was born in North Freedom, Wisconsin. Developing an interest in birds at an early age, he made his first field journal entry (a pelican seen while on vacation in 1894) at the age of eight. By 1900, Wetmore published his first paper "My Experience with a Red-headed Woodpecker," in the magazine Bird-Lore. To further his education Wetmore enrolled at the University of Kansas in 1905. During his studies there he did a stint as an assistant in the University Museum, under the direction of Charles D. Bunker. Alexander Wetmore later received his BA from the University of Kansas in 1912; finally receiving his MS in 1916 and his PhD in 1920 from George Washington University.

== Career ==
Wetmore began federal service in 1910, working for the Biological Survey of the Department of Agriculture. In 1915, he researched the use of lead shot in causing death in waterfowl. His paleontological research led to his work on the fossil birds Palaeochenoides mioceanus and Nesotrochis debooyi.

From April 1923 to July 1924, Wetmore was the lead scientist of the Tanager Expedition, a series of five biological surveys to study the flora, fauna and geology of the Northwestern Hawaiian Islands, Johnston Atoll and Wake Island. In 1924, Wetmore joined the Smithsonian Institution as the superintendent of the National Zoo in Washington, D.C. In 1925, Wetmore was appointed assistant secretary of the Smithsonian Institution, becoming secretary between 1945 and 1952. In 1929, he participated in the Pinchot South Sea Expedition. In 1939, he was elected a Corresponding Member of the Royal Australasian Ornithologists Union He wrote A Systematic Classification for the Birds of the World (1930, revised in 1951 and 1960). This Wetmore Order received widespread acceptance, remaining popular until the end of the twentieth century. From 1944 to 1946, Wetmore served as the 15th president of The Explorers Club. Between 1946 and 1966, Wetmore made annual trips to Panama to study and collect specimens of the birds of the Isthmus. His 4-volume magnum opus, Birds of the Republic of Panama, was published by the Smithsonian between 1965 and 1984, the last volume appearing posthumously. He also served on the boards of trustees of Science Service, now known as Society for Science & the Public, from 1946 to 1953, and of the National Geographic Society, where he served successively as vice chairman, acting chairman, and chairman emeritus of the Committee for Research and Exploration, from 1933 until his death, in his final years as a trustee emeritus.

Several taxa of birds have been named in his honor, including the Cretaceous genus Alexornis and the tanagers Wetmorethraupis sterrhopteron and Buthraupis wetmorei. Insects, mammals, amphibians, mollusks, and one plant (an Argentinian cactus), as well as a bridge in Panama and the Wetmore Glacier in the Antarctic, have also been named after him. Wetmore is commemorated in the scientific names of one species and two subspecies of reptiles: Pholidoscelis wetmorei, Uromacer frenatus wetmorei, and Anolis brevirostris wetmorei.

In 1953, he married Annie Beatrice van der Biest Thielan, who became guarantor of the American Ornithologists' Union after his death in 1978. His papers and an oral history interview are held at the Smithsonian Institution.
