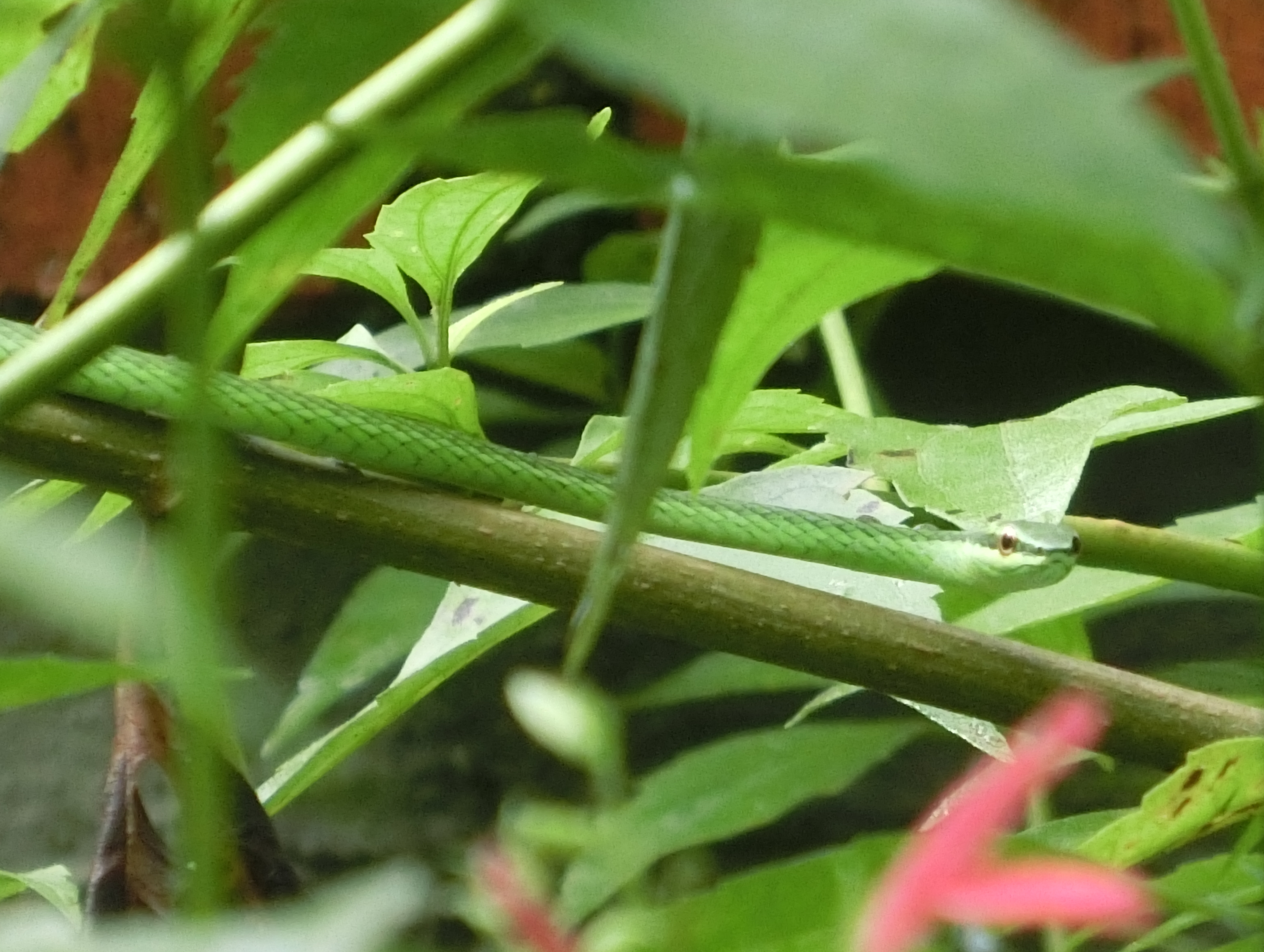
- Uromacer catesbyi

Scientific classification
- Kingdom: Animalia
- Phylum: Chordata
- Class: Reptilia
- Order: Squamata
- Suborder: Serpentes
- Family: Colubridae
- Subfamily: Dipsadinae
- Genus: Uromacer; A.M.C. Duméril, Bibron & A.H.A. Duméril, 1854

= Uromacer =

Genus of snakes

Uromacer is a genus of snakes in the family Colubridae endemic to the island of Hispaniola (in the Dominican Republic and Haiti).

== Species ==
The following three species are recognized as being valid.

- Uromacer catesbyi (Schlegel, 1837) - blunt-headed Hispaniolan vine snake, Catesby's pointed snake
- Uromacer frenatus (Günther, 1865) - slender Hispaniolan vine snake, island pointed snake
- Uromacer oxyrhynchus A.M.C. Duméril, Bibron & A.H.A. Duméril, 1854 - sharp-nosed Hispaniolan vine snake, pointed snake

Nota bene: A binomial authority in parentheses indicates that the species was originally described in a genus other than Uromacer.
