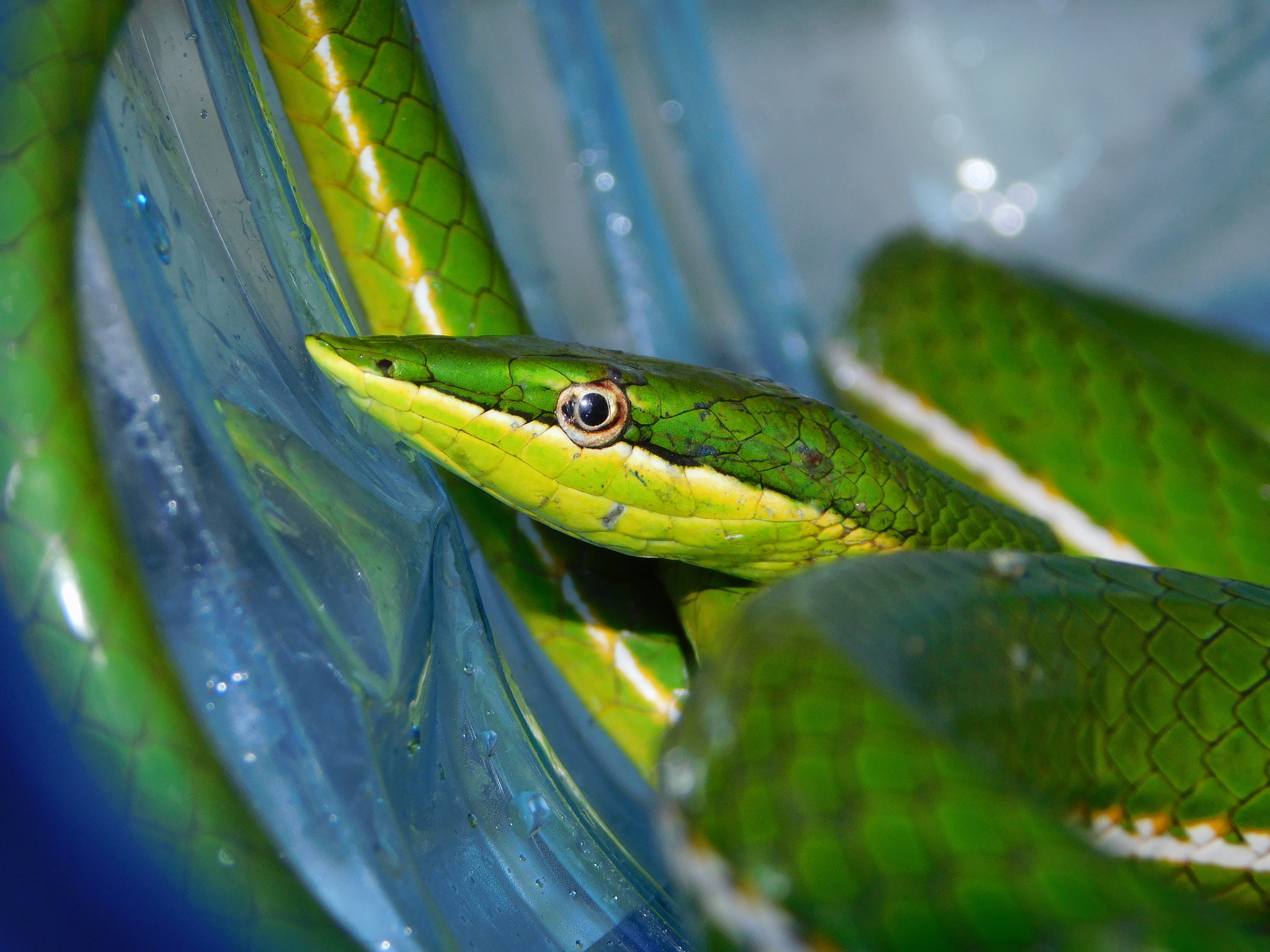

Conservation status
- Least Concern (IUCN 3.1)

Scientific classification
- Kingdom: Animalia
- Phylum: Chordata
- Class: Reptilia
- Order: Squamata
- Suborder: Serpentes
- Family: Colubridae
- Genus: Uromacer
- Species: U. oxyrhynchus

Binomial name
- Uromacer oxyrhynchus Duméril, Bibron & Duméril, 1854

= Uromacer oxyrhynchus =

Species of snake

Uromacer oxyrhynchus, the sharp-nosed Hispaniolan vine snake or pointed snake, is a species of snake of the family Colubridae endemic to the Caribbean island of Hispaniola (in Haiti and the Dominican Republic).
