= Annie Beatrice van der Biest Thielan Wetmore =

Beatrice Wetmore
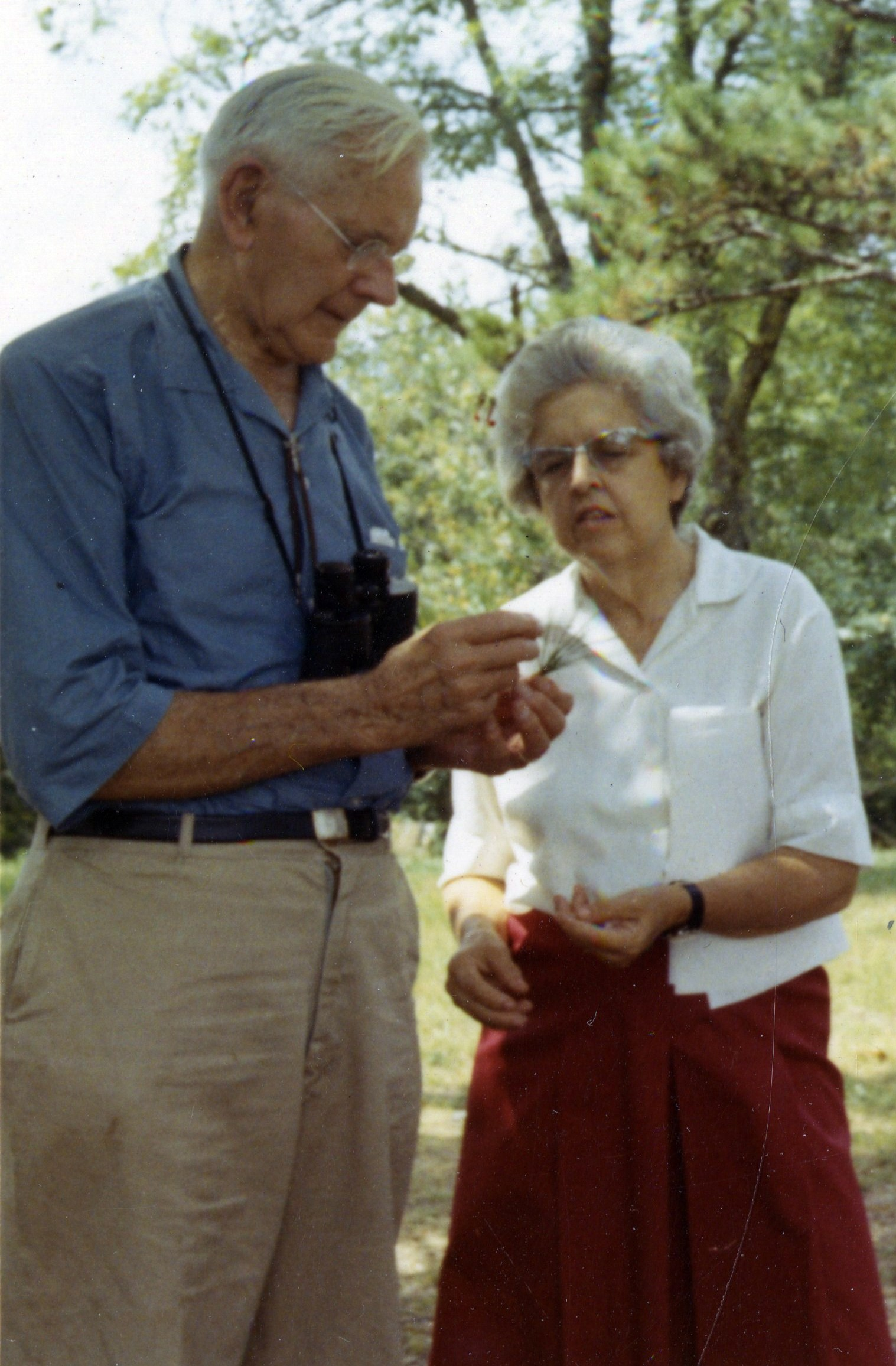
- Beatrice Wetmore with her husband Alexander (1969)
- Born: Annie Beatrice van der Biest Thielen; 11 January 1910; Curaçao
- Died: 1 March 1997 (aged 87); Silver Spring, Maryland
- Occupations: Ornithologist, Benefactor
- Spouse: Alexander Wetmore (1886–1978)

Annie Beatrice van der Biest Thielen Wetmore (11 January 1910 – 1 March 1997), widely known as Bea Wetmore, was a Curaçaoan-American ornithologist and benefactor.

== Early years ==
She was born Annie Beatrice van der Biest Thielen in 1910 on the Caribbean island of Curaçao, which is a territory of the Netherlands. Bea was a translator conversant in several languages including Dutch, English, Spanish, and Papiamento, the regional dialect of the Dutch West Indies. She worked as a secretary/translator for several Dutch government entities in Washington, D.C., in Sydney, Australia during World War II, and the World Health Organization.

She became a naturalized citizen of the United States in August 1944.

=== Marriage and partnership ===
She met ornithologist Alexander Wetmore (1886–1978) in 1944 and they married in 1953, not long after he retired as the sixth General Secretary of the Smithsonian Institution. With his retirement, which allowed Alex (assisted by Bea) to conduct full-time research, they made collecting expeditions to Panama every year, with the last one taking place in 1966. Alex had begun these trips in 1944. As a result of the expeditions, the couple worked closely on the four volumes of Birds of the Republic of Panama, published by the Smithsonian Institution between 1965 and 1984 (the last volume appeared after Alex died). Each tome lists Alexander Wetmore as the only author or first of several authors. While Bea is not listed as an author on the finished publications, her work is acknowledged on field notebooks, such as Alex's 1955 Panama notebook.

The couple also collaborated on some of Alex's hundreds of publications in scientific journals.

For the couple's last collecting expedition, they went to Bea's former Caribbean homeland in 1969, which, according to her obituary, "resulted in a nice series of specimens from the island of Bonaire."

One distinctive subspecies of Grasshopper sparrow, Ammodramus savannarum beatriceae, from the plains of west-central Panama, is named in honor of Beatrice Wetmore.

=== Benefactor ===
Bea was first listed in 1979 as a significant financial supporter of the American Ornithological Society, (formerly known as the American Ornithologists' Union (AOU)), and is still mentioned as a lifetime Guarantor benefactor. She also regularly gave very generously to other organizations such as the AOUs Wetmore Fund and the Wetmore Fund of the Division of Birds at the Smithsonian National Museum of Natural History.

== Last years ==
After Alex died in 1978, Bea devoted much of her time toward compiling ornithological records about Panamanian fauna, extracting data from Alex's field journals as well as the four volumes, Birds of the Republic of Panama.

As a widow, according to her obituary, she sold their Maryland home. Subsequently, she moved numerous times but kept with her "the vast accumulated treasure of bird paintings, prints, figurines, mementos of field expeditions, and other reminders of a long and productive ornithological life. This process never stopped for long. Her friends would jest that her hobby was moving, as she changed residences some 10 or 12 times in 18 years, apparently deriving much pleasure from rearranging all her "Wetmorabilia" in a new setting at frequent intervals, thus keeping alive the memory of Alex for herself and all those who visited her."

Bea Wetmore passed away "unexpectedly but peacefully" in her home in Silver Spring, Maryland on 1 March 1997, at the age of 87.
