= William Cocke (politician) =

Colonial American politician (1672–1720)

- Born: 1672; Sudbury, Suffolk, England
- Died: January 22, 1720 (aged 47–48); Williamsburg, Virginia
- Burial place: Bruton Parish Church
- Education: Queens' College, Cambridge
- Occupation: Physician

William Cocke (1672 – 1720) was an English politician and medical doctor in the early 1700s. He was among the first university-trained medical doctors in the Colony of Virginia.

== Early life ==
William Cocke was born in Sudbury, Suffolk, England, in 1672. He graduated from Queens' College, Cambridge with a Bachelor of Medicine in 1693.

== Career ==
Cocke arrived in Williamsburg, Virginia in 1710, opening a medical practice and serving as the personal physician of Lieutenant Governor Alexander Spotswood. Cocke quickly became "an important force" in the politics of the Colony of Virginia. On June 10, 1712, Spotswood took advantage of the departure of the former governor Edmund Jenings and made Cocke secretary of the colony. In August 1713, the Virginia leadership appointed Cocke to fill the vacant seat on the Virginia Governor's Council.

In 1714, Cocke was one of three Privy Council members who helped the House of Burgesses draft a bill congratulating the new king George I on gaining the throne of Great Britain. From the summer of 1716 to the spring of 1718, Cocke was in London, England, in part to address the Board of Trade on behalf of the colony. On October 22, 1720, Cocke was addressing a session of the General Court in Williamsburg and collapsed onto William Byrd II and died.

== Personal life ==
Cocke's wife, Elisabeth Catesby, was the sister of English naturalist Mark Catesby. Their daughter Anne Cocke married Major William Woodford in 1722. Their grandson, William Woodford, was a general in the Revolutionary War.

Cocke died on October 22, 1720, in Williamsburg. He was buried under the floor of the Bruton Parish Church in Williamsburg. After Cocke's death, his wife eventually married John Holloway, speaker of the House of Burgesses.
