= Dorothy Clive Garden =

Charitable garden trust in the Staffordshire, Shropshire, Cheshire borders, UK

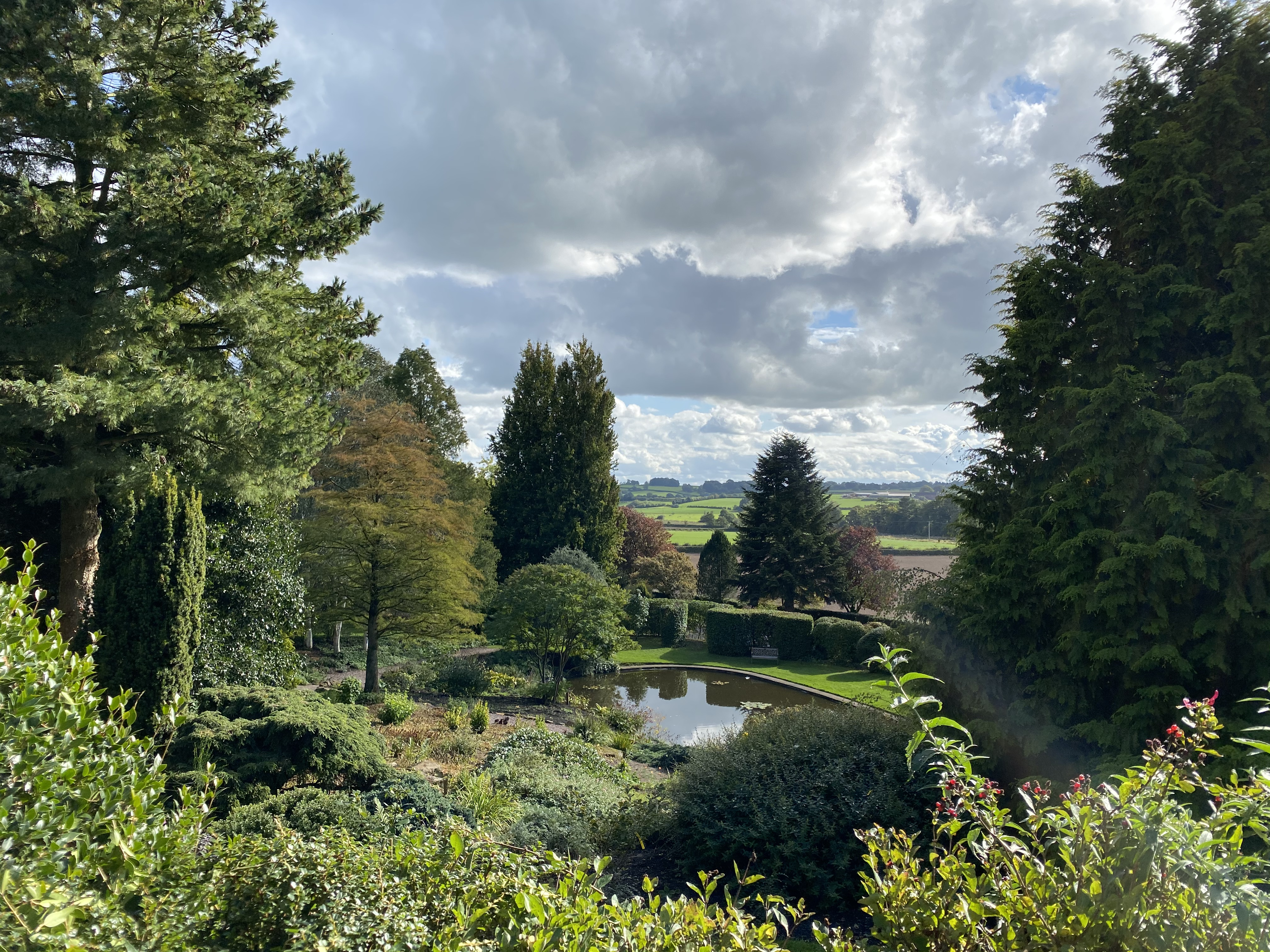
- Interactive map of Dorothy Clive Garden
- Type: Landscaped Quarry Garden
- Location: Willoughbridge, Market Drayton, Shropshire, England
- Coordinates: 52°57′23″N 2°22′05″W
- Area: 12 acres (4.9 ha)
- Founder: Harry Clive
- Operator: The Willoughbridge Garden Trust
- Website: Official website

The Dorothy Clive Garden is a charitable garden trust located in Willoughbridge, Shropshire, close to its Staffordshire and Cheshire borders.

== History ==
The garden was created in 1940 by Colonel Harry Clive. Colonel Clive wished to provide his wife Dorothy, who was suffering from Parkinson's disease, with a 'series of interesting walks'. The site of the garden was previously a sandstone quarry, with some nearby oak trees which provided a cover for the plants providing a protected area for flowers and plants. Some of the first plants introduced to the garden by Colonel Clive included Exbury azaleas and Knaphill hybrids.

In 1958, Colonel Clive entrusted the management of the garden to a newly created, small, independent charity, the Willoughbridge Garden Trust, which has managed the garden since then. This trust employs a small team to manage and maintain the site, who also work alongside volunteers to run events and manage gardening and administration.

== The Garden ==
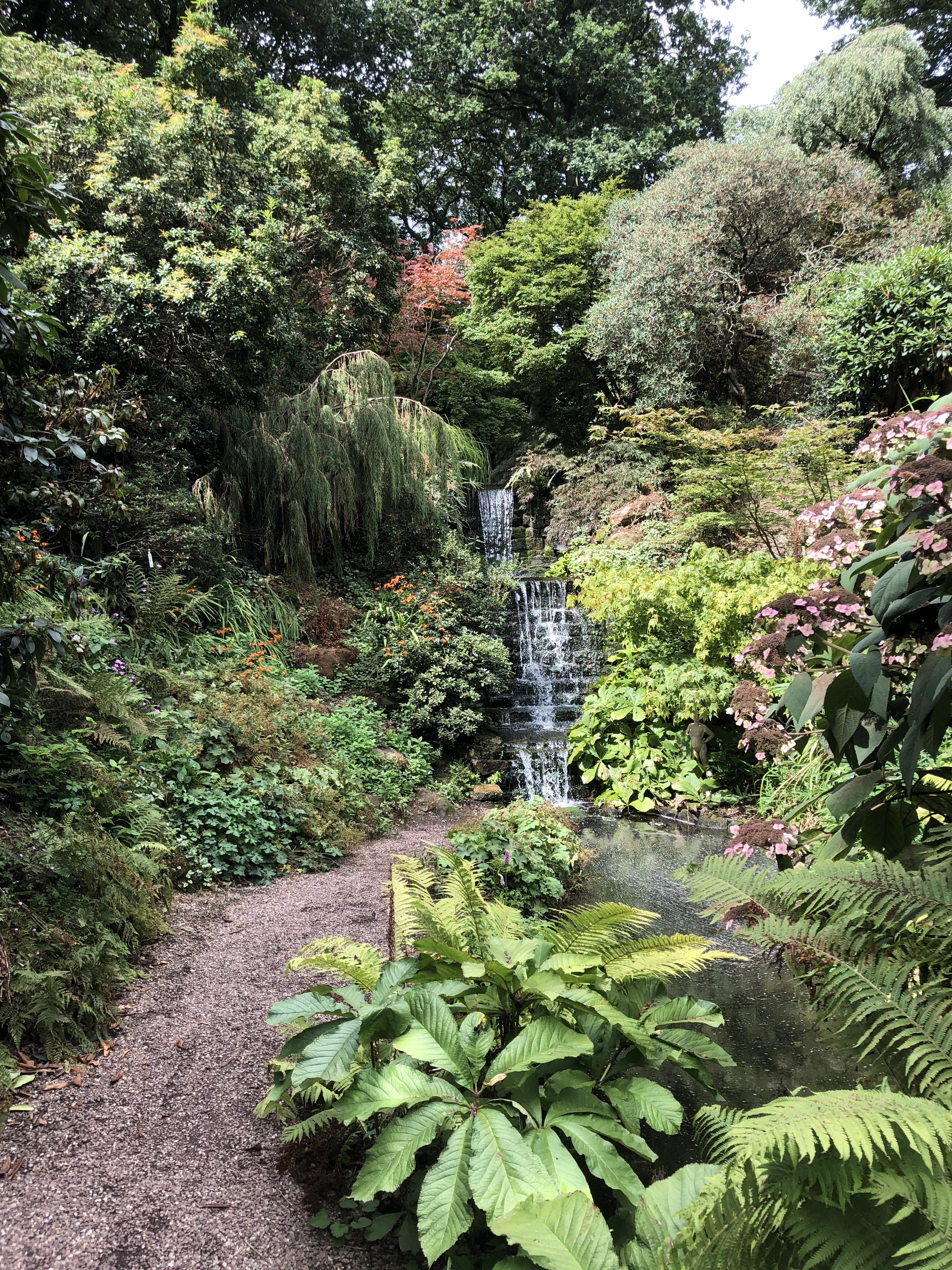
The waterfall feature inside the quarry garden.

The garden occupies 12 acres, and is separated into two equal-sized sections, with the tearoom, pavilion, and quarry garden entrance dividing separating the two sections. The layout of the garden was designed by Colonel Clive to be a gentle walk throughout, for the benefit of his ailing wife, Dorothy, intending it to be a therapeutic garden for her.

Plants including alpines, conifers, herbs, lavender, and rhododendrons can be found at the garden.

Some other notable parts of the garden include:

- The Edible Woodland
- Rose Walk
- Laburnum arch
- Pavilion
- Waterfall (inside the quarry garden)
- Gravel Garden
- Daffodil Walk
- Camellia Walk
- Seasonal Borders
