= Mark Catesby =

English naturalist, painter and etcher (1683–1749)

Mark Catesby FRS
- Born: 24 March 1683; Castle Hedingham, Essex, England
- Died: 23 December 1749 (aged 66); London, England
- Known for: Natural History of Carolina, Florida and the Bahama Islands
- Spouse: Elizabeth Rowland
- Children: Six (at least)
- Parents: John Catesby (father); Elizabeth Jekyll (mother)
- Scientific career
- Fields: Naturalist (both flora and fauna) and artist
- Patrons: Peter Collinson

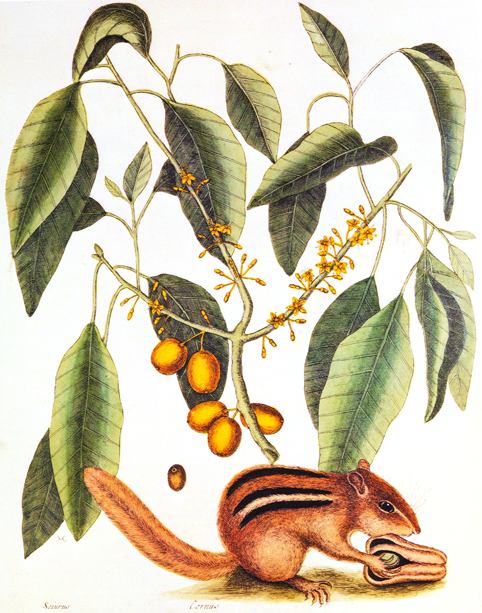
Plate from Natural History of Carolina, Florida and the Bahama Islands (1731–1743)

Mark Catesby (24 March 1683 – 23 December 1749) was an English naturalist who studied the flora and fauna of the New World. Between 1729 and 1747, Catesby published his Natural History of Carolina, Florida and the Bahama Islands, the first published account of the flora and fauna of North America. It included 220 plates of birds, reptiles, amphibians, fish, insects, mammals and plants.

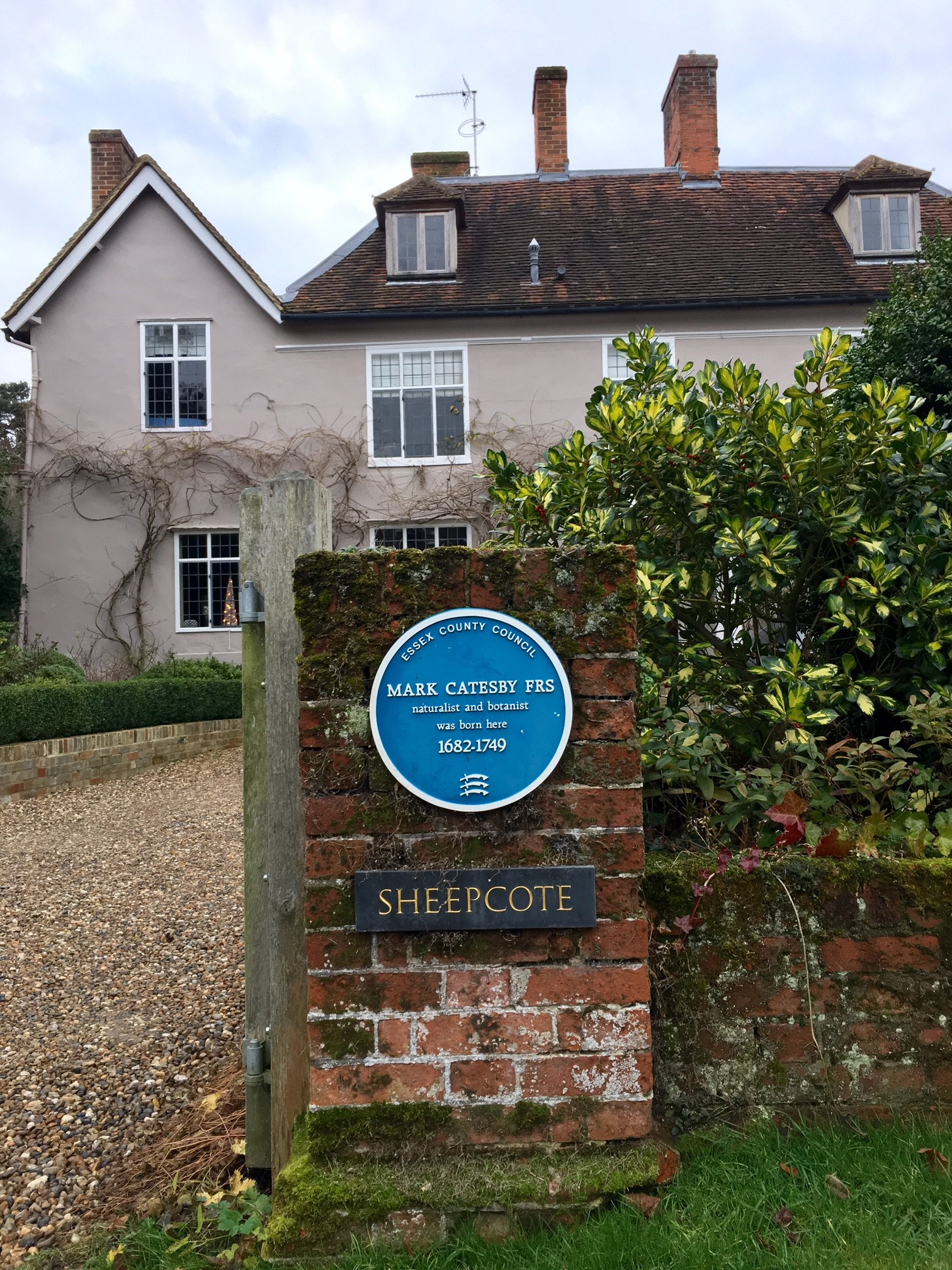
Mark Catesby's birthplace in Castle Hedingham, Essex

== Life and works ==
Catesby was born on 24 March 1683 and baptised at Castle Hedingham, Essex on 30 March 1683. His father, John Catesby (buried 12 November 1703), was a local politician and gentleman farmer. His mother was Elizabeth Jekyll (buried 5 September 1708). The family owned a farm and house, Holgate, in Sudbury, Suffolk as well as property in London. An acquaintance with the naturalist John Ray led to Catesby becoming interested in natural history. The death of his father left Catesby enough to live on, so in 1712, he accompanied his sister Elizabeth to Williamsburg, Virginia. She was the wife of Dr. William Cocke, who had been a member of the Council and Secretary of State for the Colony of Virginia. According to their father's will, Elizabeth had married Dr. Cocke against her father's wishes. Catesby visited the West Indies in 1714, and returned to Virginia, then home to England in 1719.

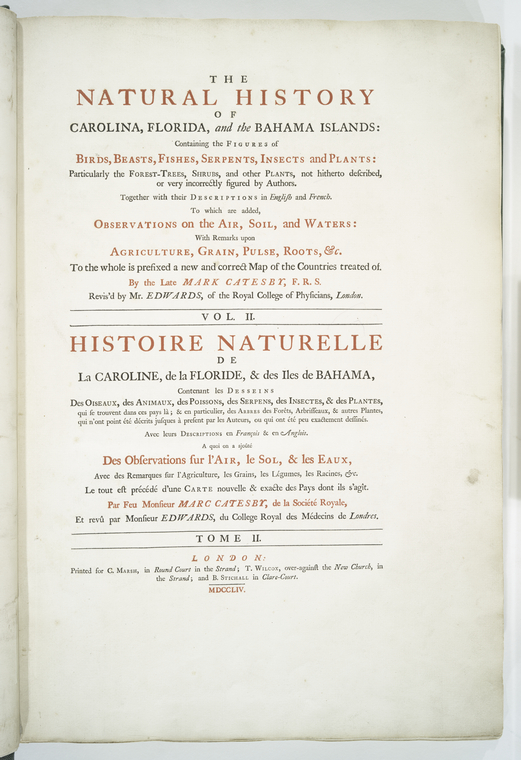
Title page, volume two, second edition of Catesby's The Natural History of Carolina, Florida and the Bahama Islands, London, 1754

Catesby had collected seeds and botanical specimens in Virginia and Jamaica. He sent the pressed specimens to Dr. Samuel Dale of Braintree in Essex, and gave seeds to a Hoxton nurseryman Thomas Fairchild as well as to Dale and to the Bishop of London, Dr Henry Compton. Plants from Virginia, raised from Catesby's seeds, made his name known to gardeners and scientists in England, and in 1722 he was recommended by William Sherard to undertake a plant-collecting expedition to Carolina on behalf of certain members of the Royal Society. From May 1722, Catesby was based in Charleston, South Carolina, and travelled to other parts of that colony, collecting plants and animals. He sent preserved specimens to Hans Sloane and to William Sherard, and seeds to various contacts including Sherard and Peter Collinson. Consequently, Catesby was responsible for introducing such plants as Catalpa bignonioides and the eponymous Catesbaea spinosa (lilythorn) to cultivation in Europe. Catesby returned to England in 1726.

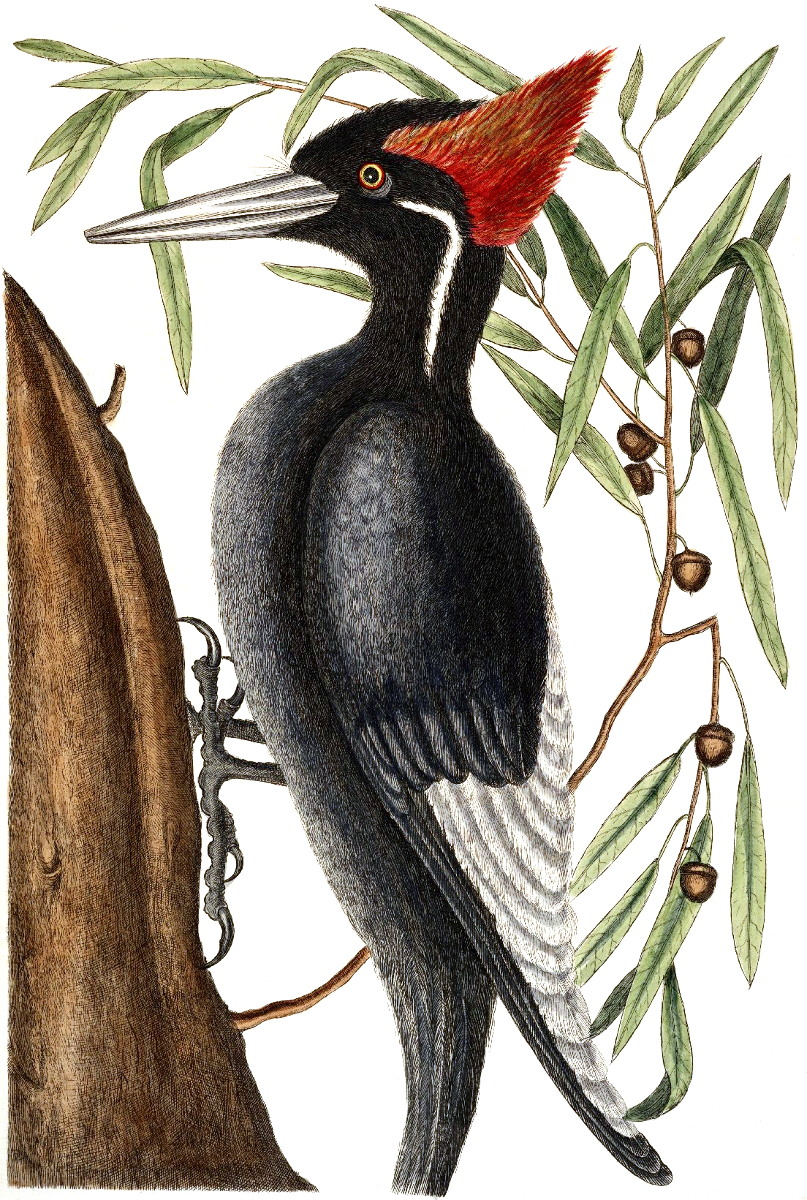
The ivory-billed woodpecker, which was later to be presumed extinct in North America. Here the bird is shown in association with the willow oak,Quercus phellos. Plate from Natural History of Carolina, Florida and the Bahama Islands (1729–1747)

Catesby spent the next twenty years preparing and publishing his Natural History. Publication was financed by subscriptions from his "Encouragers" as well as an interest-free loan from one of the fellows of the Royal Society, the Quaker Peter Collinson. Catesby learnt how to etch the copper plates himself. The first eight plates had no backgrounds, but from then on Catesby included plants with his animals. He completed the first part in May 1729 and presented it to Queen Caroline; the first volume, comprising five parts, was finished in November 1732. Mark Catesby was elected a fellow of the Royal Society in February 1733 and was made a member of the Society of Gentlemen of Spalding in December 1743. The second volume containing another five parts was completed in December 1743, and in 1747 he produced a supplement from material sent to him by friends in America, particularly John Bartram, and also his younger brother, John, who was based with a British regiment in Gibraltar. Not all the plates in Natural history are by Catesby: several, including the splendid and famous image of Magnolia grandiflora were by Georg Ehret. Catesby's original preparatory drawings for Natural History of Carolina, Florida and the Bahama Islands are in the Royal Library, Windsor Castle, and selections have been exhibited in USA, Japan and various places in England including at the Queen's Gallery, London, in 1997–1998, and Gainsborough's House in Sudbury in 2015. On 5 March 1747, Catesby read a paper entitled "Of birds of passage" to the Royal Society in London, and he is now recognised as one of the first people to describe bird migration.

Mark Catesby married Elizabeth Rowland on 8 October 1747 in St George's Chapel, Hyde Park Corner, but they had been a couple for about 17 years, having at least six children between April 1731 and June 1740. They were parishioners of St Giles Cripplegate in London and later, when that parish was subdivided, of St Luke Old Street. He died just before Christmas 1749 on Saturday 23 December in his house behind St Luke Old Street, London, and was buried in its churchyard. His grave is now lost. Catesby's Hortus britanno-americanus ... was published posthumously in 1763, and a second edition, entitled Hortus Europae americanus ... was issued in 1767.

The Swedish naturalist Carl Linnaeus included information from Catesby's Natural History in the 10th edition of his Systema Naturae (1758). Linnaeus cited Catesby's book for 81 bird species and for 33 of these Catesby was the only author cited.

== Legacy ==
Catesbaea, lilythorn, a genus of thorny shrubs belonging to Rubiaceae (madder family) from the West Indies and southeastern USA was named after Catesby, originally by Jan Frederik Gronovius. However, under present rules of nomenclature, this name was formally published by Carl Linnaeus in 1753 in his Species Plantarum based on plate 100 in volume two of Catesby's Natural history of Carolina, Florida and the Bahama Islands.

The American bullfrog, Lithobates catesbeianus, is named in honor of Catesby.

Catesby is commemorated in the scientific names of two species of New World snakes: Dipsas catesbyi and Uromacer catesbyi.

== See also ==
- List of wildlife artists
