= G. S. R. Subba Rao =

Indian natural product chemist

- Born: 21 August 1937 (age 89); Kolavennu, Krishna District, Andhra Pradesh, India
- Education: Andhra University; University of Manchester; Australian National University
- Known for: Studies on dihydroaromatics
- Awards: 1982 Shanti Swarup Bhatnagar Prize; 1992 UGC Sir C. V. Raman Award; 1997 INSA T. R. Seshadri 70th Birthday Commemoration Medal; 1998 IISc Alumni Award for Excellence in Research; 2003 INSA Senior Scientist Award; 2004 INSA Golden Jubilee Commemoration Medal
- Scientific career
- Fields: Natural product chemistry
- Workplaces: Indian Institute of Science
- Doctoral advisor: L. Ramachandra Row; Arthur Birch

Ganugapati Sree Rama Subba Rao (born 21 August 1937) is an Indian natural product chemist and a former chair of the department of sciences at the Indian Institute of Science (IISc). He is known for his researches on "dihydroaromatics obtained through Birch reduction of aromatic compounds" and is an elected fellow of the Indian National Science Academy, and the Indian Academy of Sciences. The Council of Scientific and Industrial Research, the apex agency of the Government of India for scientific research, awarded him the Shanti Swarup Bhatnagar Prize for Science and Technology, one of the highest Indian science awards, in 1982, for his contributions to chemical sciences.

== Biography ==
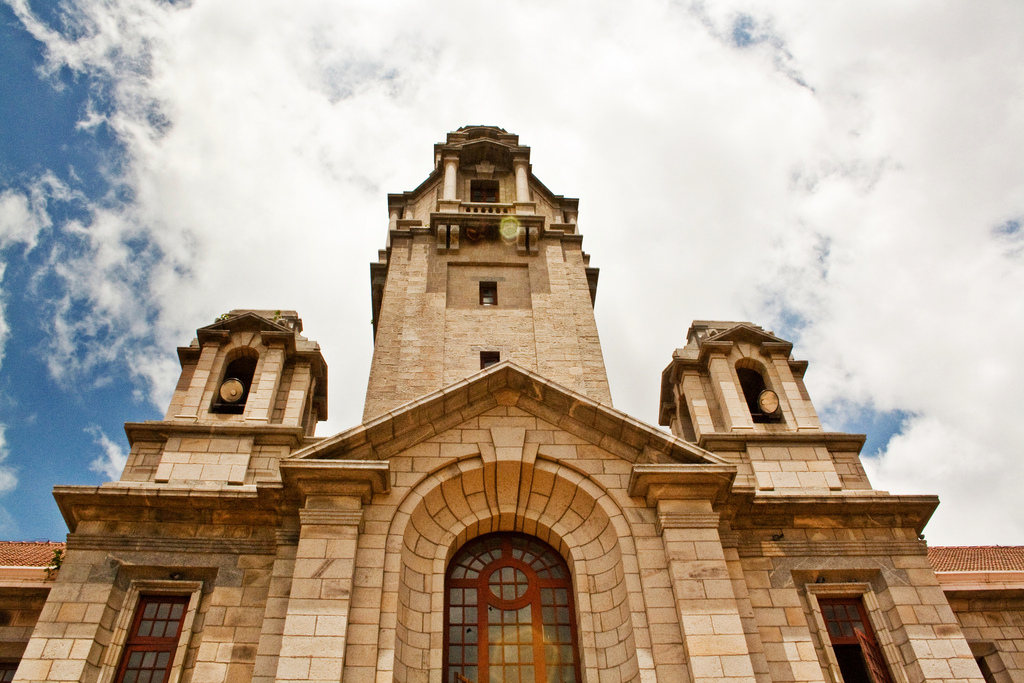
Indian Institute of Science

G. S. R. Subba Rao, born on 21 August 1937 in Kolavennu, in the south Indian state of Andhra Pradesh to Satyanarayana Ganugapati and Lakshmi Subba Rao, did his college studies at Andhra University from where he graduated in chemistry in 1957 and followed it up with a master's degree in 1959. Subsequently, he enrolled for doctoral studies under the guidance of L. Ramachandra Row and secured the degree of Doctor of Science in 1962 and moved to University of Manchester for his post-doctoral studies at the laboratory of Arthur J. Birch. He obtained a PhD in 1966 and completed his post doctoral studies at Australian National University. On his return to India in 1971, he joined the Indian Institute of Science as a member of faculty at the department of organic chemistry where he set up his research group and served as the dean of the faculty of science, eventually superannuating from academic duties as the chair of the department. He also serves as a director of Novosynth Research Labs and Bal Research Foundation, two entities involved in scientific research.

Subba Rao is married to Lakshmi Sita Valluri and the couple have two children, a daughter, Rama and son, Krishna. The family lives in Hyderabad.

== Legacy ==
Subba Rao's early researches were focused on natural product chemistry and through his studies of the dihydroaromatics, he developed new protocols for synthesising aromatic compounds using Birch reduction. His contributions are reported in the synthesis of steroids and polyketides as well as the studies of the "mechanistic aspects of dissolving metal reductions". His work has been documented by way of over 150 articles published in peer-reviewed journals He has guided 28 doctoral scholars in their studies, has been associated with several journals as a member of their editorial boards and served as a council member of the Indian National Science Academy from 2001 to 2003.

== Awards and honours ==
The Council of Scientific and Industrial Research awarded Subba Rao the Shanti Swarup Bhatnagar Prize, one of the highest Indian science awards, in 1982. He received the Sir C. V. Raman Award of the University Grants Commission of India in 1992 and the T. R. Seshadri 70th Birthday Commemoration Medal of the Indian National Science Academy (INSA) in 1997. INSA honoured him again with the Senior Scientist Award in 2003 and the Golden Jubilee Commemoration Medal in 2004. In between, he received the Alumni Award for Excellence in Research in Science of the Indian Institute of Science in 1998. He is an elected fellow of the Indian National Science Academy and the Indian Academy of Sciences and has delivered a number of award orations including the Professor Venkataraman Memorial Lecture of the National Chemical Laboratory.

== Citations ==
- Stephen J. Lippard (17 September 2009). Progress in Inorganic Chemistry. John Wiley & Sons. pp. 186–. ISBN 978-0-470-16679-6.
- Barry M. Trost (8 September 1992). Reduction: Selectivity, Strategy & Efficiency in Modern Organic Chemistry. Elsevier Science. pp. 520–. ISBN 978-0-08-091251-6.
- Barry M. Trost; Ian Fleming (1991). Comprehensive Organic Synthesis: Reduction. Elsevier. pp. 520–. ISBN 978-0-08-040599-5.
- R. Dickson (30 September 1985). Homogeneous Catalysis with Compounds of Rhodium and Iridium. Springer Science & Business Media. pp. 209–. ISBN 978-90-277-1880-8.
- A. A. Akhrem (6 December 2012). Total Steroid Synthesis. Springer Science & Business Media. pp. 332–. ISBN 978-1-4757-0587-4.
- Michael C. Pirrung; Andrew T. Morehead, Jr.; Bruce G. Young, David Goldsmith (22 September 2009). The Total Synthesis of Natural Products, Volume 11, Part B: Bicyclic and Tricyclic Sesquiterpenes. John Wiley & Sons. pp. 452–. ISBN 978-0-470-12963-0.
- Robert T. Blickenstaff; Anil C. Ghosh; Gordon C. Wolf (22 October 2013). Total Synthesis of Steroids: Organic Chemistry: A Series of Monographs. Elsevier Science. pp. 125–. ISBN 978-1-4832-1642-3.

== Selected bibliography ==
- Kaliappan, K.; Subba Rao, G. S. R. (1997). "A new total synthesis of 2-pupukeanone". Tetrahedron Letters. 38 (12): 2185–2186. doi:10.1016/S0040-4039(97)00298-0.
- Sathya Shanker, P.; Subba Rao, G. S. R. (1998). "Synthesis based on cyclohexadienes. Part 25. Total synthesis of (±)-allo-cedrol (khusiol)". Journal of the Chemical Society, Perkin Transactions 1 (3): 539–548. doi:10.1039/A705988D.
- John Biju, P.; Subba Rao, G. S. R. (1999). "Aromatics to polyquinanes: a general method for the construction of tricyclo[6.3.0.04,8]-and tricyclo[6.3.0.02,6]undecanes". Tetrahedron Letters. 40 (52): 9379–9382. doi:10.1016/S0040-4039(99)02026-2.
- John Biju, P.; Kaliappan, Krishna; Laxmisha, M. S.; Subba Rao, G. S. R. (2000). "Synthesis based on cyclohexadienes. Part 34. A tandem cationic rearrangement-ene cyclisation route to 2-pupukeanone". Journal of the Chemical Society, Perkin Transactions 1 (22): 3714–3718. doi:10.1039/B003409F.
- Subba Rao, G. S. R.; Raghavan, Sadagopan (2001). "Synthetic studies on morellin. Part 4: Synthesis of 2,2-dimethyl- 12-[3-methylbut-2-enyl]-2H,6H-pyrano[3,2-b]xanthen-6-one". Journal of the Indian Institute of Science. 81: 393–401.

== See also ==
- Steroids
- Polyketides
