= Cornforth (surname) =

Cornforth is a surname. Notable people with the surname include:

- Arthur Cornforth (1861–1938), American politician
- Fanny Cornforth (1835–1909), English artist's model and mistress of Dante Gabriel Rossetti
- John Cornforth (disambiguation), multiple people
- Mark Cornforth (born 1972), Canadian ice hockey player
- Maurice Cornforth (1909–1980), British Marxist philosopher
- Rita Cornforth (1915–2012), Australian–British biochemist, wife of John Cornforth
