= William Henry Perkin Jr. =

English organic chemist

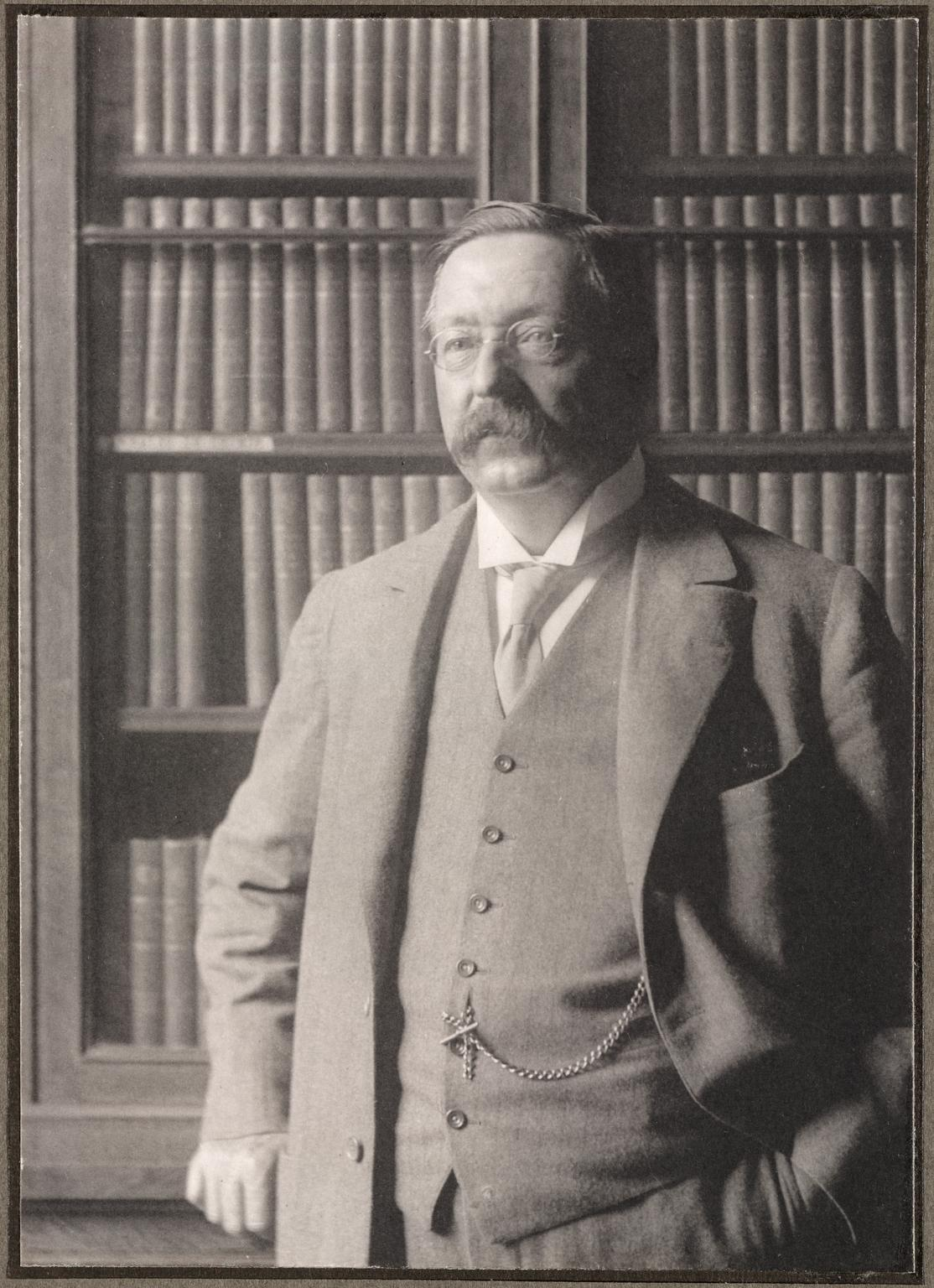
- Born: 17 June 1860; Sudbury, Middlesex, England
- Died: 17 September 1929 (aged 69); Oxford, England
- Education: Royal College of Science; University of Würzburg; Ludwig-Maximilians-Universität München
- Known for: Perkin triangle Perkin alicyclic synthesis
- Awards: Longstaff Prize (1900); Davy Medal (1904); Royal Medal (1925)
- Scientific career
- Workplaces: Heriot-Watt College; Victoria University of Manchester; University of Oxford
- Doctoral advisor: Adolf von Baeyer
- Doctoral students: Robert Robinson; Walter Haworth; Chaim Weizmann; Victor Trikojus
- Other notable students: Carl Voegtlin

William Henry Perkin Jr., FRS FRSE (17 June 1860 – 17 September 1929) was an English organic chemist who was primarily known for his groundbreaking research work on the degradation of naturally occurring organic compounds.

== Early life ==
He was the eldest son of Sir William Henry Perkin who had founded the aniline dye industry, and was born at Sudbury, England, close to his father's dyeworks at Greenford. His brother was Arthur George Perkin (1861–1937), Professor of Colour Chemistry and Dyeing at the University of Leeds.

Perkin was educated at the City of London School and then at the Royal College of Science, South Kensington, London, and then in Germany at the University of Würzburg and the Ludwig-Maximilians-Universität München. At the Ludwig-Maximilians-Universität München, he was a doctoral student under Adolf von Baeyer. From 1883 to 1886, he held the position of Privatdozent at the Ludwig-Maximilians-Universität München. He never lost contact with his friend Baeyer, and delivered the memorial lecture following Baeyer's death in 1917.

In 1887, he returned to Britain and became professor of chemistry at Heriot-Watt College, Edinburgh, Scotland, for which the Chemistry wing of the main campus is currently named The William Perkin Building.

== Manchester ==
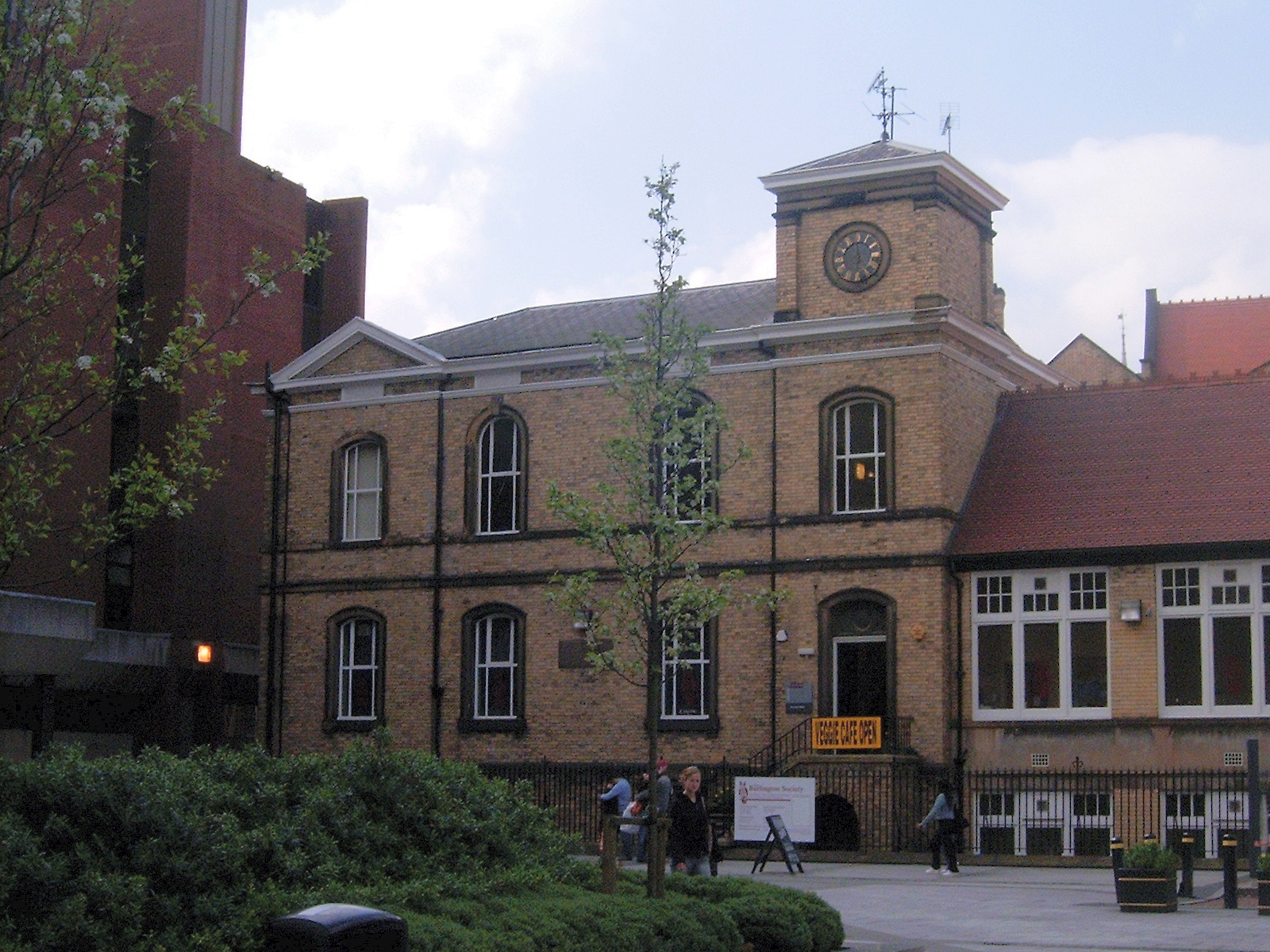
The Schunck Building, University of Manchester; on the right the Perkin Laboratory

In 1892, he accepted the chair of organic chemistry at Owens College, Manchester, England, succeeding Carl Schorlemmer, which he held until 1912. During this period, his stimulating teaching and brilliant researches attracted students from all parts, and he formed at Manchester a school of organic chemistry famous throughout Europe. This was possible because he was assigned new laboratory buildings, which he planned together with the famous architect Alfred Waterhouse, similar to those built by Baeyer in Munich. The speech at the opening ceremony was given by Ludwig Mond. An additional laboratory building together with a library and £20,300, was a donation of the chemist and industrialist Edward Schunck in 1895. His laboratory was removed brick by brick and recreated at Owens College.

Frank Lee Pyman, Robert Robinson (who later won a Nobel Prize in Chemistry), Walter Haworth and Eduard Hope graduated from Owens College while Perkin was there. The conflict with Chaim Weizmann, who held a postdoctoral position and was a friend of Perkin, over the fermentation of starch to isoamyl alcohol which was the starting material for synthetic rubber and therefore industrially relevant, led to the dismissal of Weizmann. In 1912, following a planned change in University politics involving industrial co-operations, which would have resulted in a significant loss of income for Perkin, he accepted a position in Oxford.

== Oxford ==
In 1912, he succeeded Professor William Odling as Waynflete Professor of Chemistry at the University of Oxford, England, a position he held until 1929. When he started five colleges had their own laboratories. He first had to move into the Odling laboratory, a replica of the mediaeval Abbot's Kitchen at Glastonbury. During Perkin's time there, new and more extensive laboratories were built (the Dyson Perrins Laboratory), and for the first time in England a period of research became a necessary part of the academic course in chemistry for an honours degree. But the constant rivalry with the physical chemistry department, for example Frederick Soddy, lead to the situation that most of the graduates chose physical or inorganic chemistry as their subject, and Perkin got most of his postdoctoral employees from other universities.

== Published work ==
Perkin's work was published in a series of papers in Transactions of the Chemical Society. The earlier papers dealt with the properties and modes of synthesis of cloud chain hydrocarbons and their derivatives. This work led naturally to the synthesis of many terpenes and members of the camphor group; and also to the investigation of various alkaloids and natural dyes. In addition to purely scientific work, Perkin kept in close touch with the chemical industry. Together with his brother-in-law Professor F. Stanley Kipping, Perkin wrote textbooks on practical chemistry, inorganic and organic chemistry; their Organic Chemistry appeared in 1894. Their book on Inorganic Chemistry was first published in 1911.

== Honours and awards ==
Perkin was elected a Fellow of the Royal Society in June 1890 and was awarded their Davy Medal in 1904 and their Royal Medal in 1925. He was elected to membership of the Manchester Literary and Philosophical Society on 15 November 1892, after his father, WH Perkin who was elected on 26 April 1892. He was president of the Chemical Society from 1913 to 1916 and was awarded their Longstaff Medal in 1900. In 1910, he was made an honorary graduate of the University of Edinburgh, receiving the degree of Doctor of Laws (LL.D.).

== Later life ==
In 1887, he married Mina Holland, one of three sisters. They had no children.

Both of his brothers-in-law were eminent scientists themselves (Arthur Lapworth and F. Stanley Kipping).

He died in Oxford on 17 September 1929 and is buried in Wolvercote Cemetery there.

== Sources ==
- Jack Morrell (1993). "W. H. Perkin Jr. at Manchester and Oxford: From Irwell to Isis". Osiris. 2nd Series. 8 (1): 104–126. doi:10.1086/368720. JSTOR 301697. PMID 11639578. S2CID 31788144.
- Tenney L. Davis (1933). "The Life and Work of Professor William Henry Perkin Jr". Osiris. 2nd Series. 19 (1): 207–208. JSTOR 225197.
- William Henry Perkin Jr. (1929). "First Pedler lecture. The early history of the synthesis of closed carbon chains". J. Chem. Soc.: 1347–1364. doi:10.1039/JR9290001347.
