= Frederic Kipping =

British chemist

(Frederic) Stanley Kipping FRS
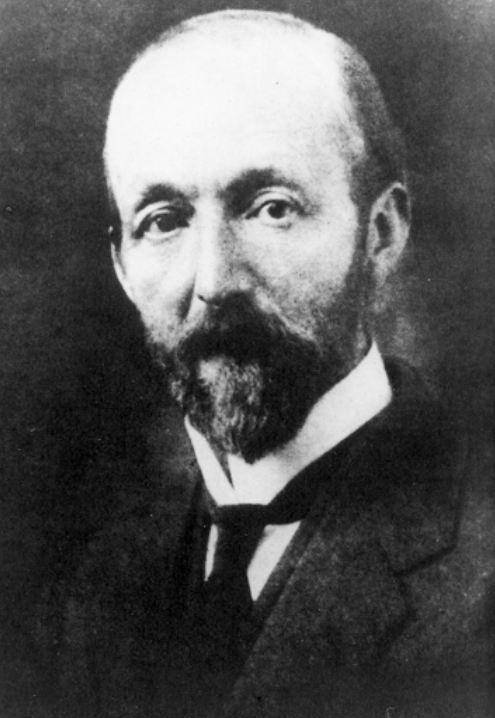
- Born: Frederic Stanley Kipping; 16 August 1863; Manchester, England
- Died: 1 May 1949 (aged 85); Criccieth, Caernarfonshire (now Gwynedd,) Wales
- Education: University of London (1882); Ludwig-Maximilians-Universität München (1887)
- Known for: Work with Silicone
- Awards: Longstaff Medal (1909); Davy Medal (1918); Royal Society Bakerian Medal (1936)
- Scientific career
- Fields: chemistry
- Workplaces: University of Nottingham
- Doctoral advisor: William Henry Perkin, Jr.

(Frederic) Stanley Kipping FRS (16 August 1863 – 1 May 1949) was an English chemist, who undertook much of the pioneering work on silicon polymers and coined the term silicone.

== Life ==
He was born in Salford, Lancashire, England, the son of James Kipping, a Bank of England official, and Julia Du Val, a daughter of painter Charles Allen Du Val. He was educated at Manchester Grammar School before enrolling in 1879 at Owens College (now Manchester University) for an external degree from the University of London. After working for the local gas company for a short time he went in 1886 to Germany to work under William Henry Perkin, Jr. in the laboratories of Adolf von Baeyer at the Ludwig-Maximilians-Universität München.

Back in England, he took a position as demonstrator for Perkin, who had been appointed professor at Heriot-Watt College, Edinburgh. In 1890, Kipping was appointed chief demonstrator in chemistry for the City and Guilds of London Institute, where he worked for the chemist Henry Edward Armstrong. In 1897, he moved to University College, Nottingham as professor of the chemistry department, and became the first newly endowed Sir Jesse Boot professor of chemistry at the university in 1928. He remained there until his retirement in 1936.

== Achievements ==
Kipping undertook much of the pioneering work into the development of silicon polymers (silicones) at Nottingham. He pioneered the study of the organic compounds of silicon (organosilicon) and coined the term silicone. His research formed the basis for the worldwide development of the synthetic rubber and silicone-based lubricant industries. He also co-wrote, with Perkin, a standard textbook on organic chemistry (Organic Chemistry, Perkin and Kipping, 1894).

He was awarded the Longstaff Medal (now Longstaff Prize) by the Chemistry Society (now Royal Society of Chemistry) in 1909.

He was elected a Fellow of the Royal Society in June 1897. He was awarded their Davy Medal in 1918 and delivered their Bakerian Lecture in 1936 and was awarded a Royal Society Bakerian Medal in the same year.

In 2004, he was inducted into the University of Akron's International Rubber Science Hall of Fame.

== Family ==
He retired in 1936 and died in Criccieth, Wales in 1949. He married Lilian Holland in 1888, one of three sisters, and both his brothers-in-law were eminent scientists themselves: Arthur Lapworth and William Henry Perkin, Jr. He had four children including (Cyril Henry) Stanley, who became a famous chess problem composer and headmaster of Wednesbury Boys School, (Frederick) Barry who was eminent in chemistry and later edited his father's Organic Chemistry textbook, and (Kathleen) Esme who made wooden jigsaw puzzles under the name of K.E.K Puzzles.

== Perkin and Kipping's Organic Chemistry text book ==
First published in 1894, the book went through many reprints and new editions well into the 1950s. From 1949 his son Barry Kipping was the sole editor. Perkin and Kipping also published a text book on Inorganic Chemistry, first published in 1911.

== See also ==
- Silicon
- Silicone
- Siloxane
- Organosilicon
- Silicone grease
- Silicone oil
- Silicone resin
- Silicone rubber
