= Harradence =

Surname list

Harradence is a surname. Notable people with the surname include:

- Milt Harradence (1922–2008), Canadian criminal lawyer, pilot, politician, and judge
- Rita Harradence (1915–2012), Australian-British biochemist, see Rita Cornforth
