= Angelo Menozzi =

Italian agricultural chemist and senator (1854–1947)

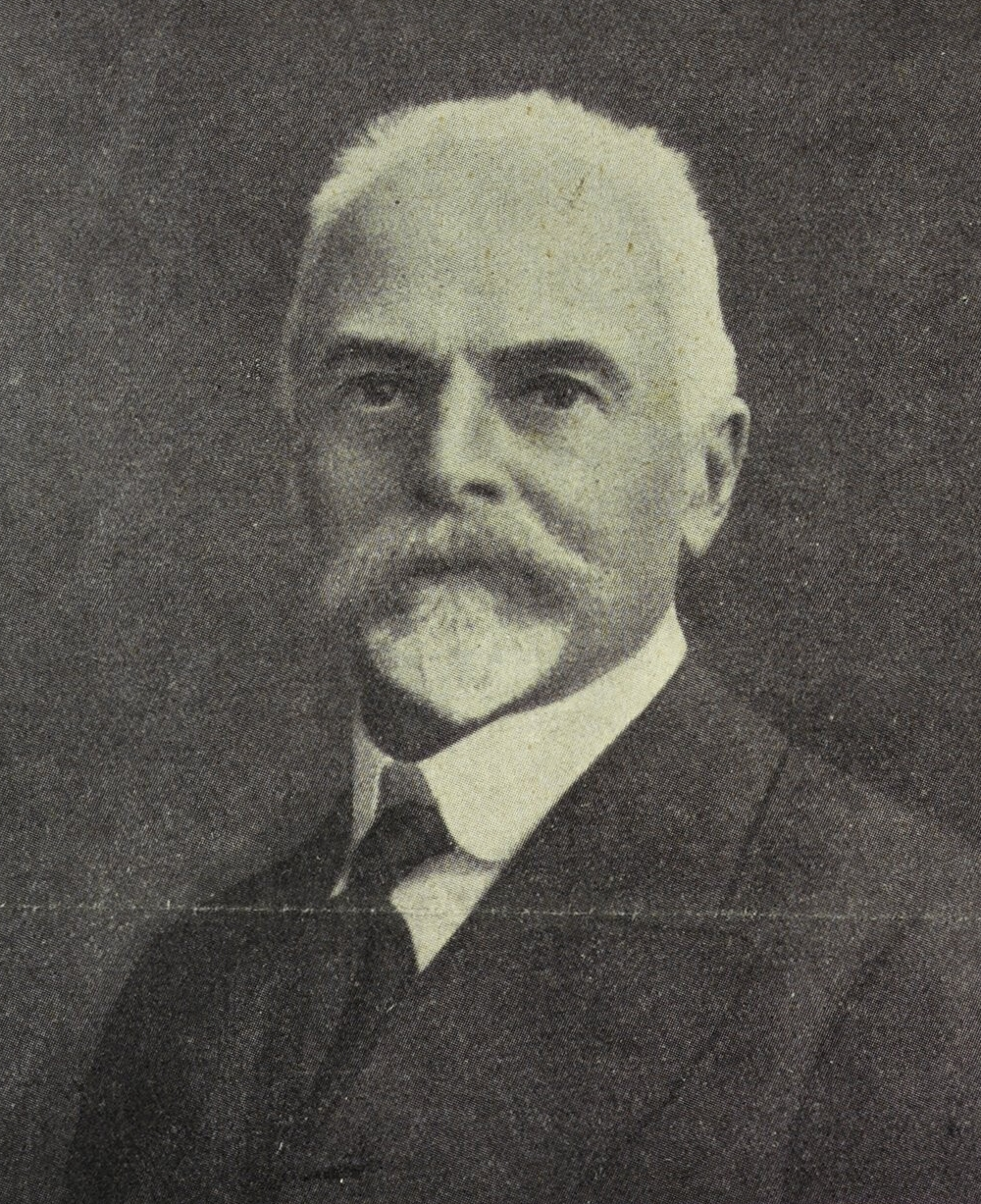

Angelo Menozzi (February 12, 1854 – January 5, 1947) was an Italian agricultural chemist. He served as director of the Royal College of Agriculture in Milan and published an influential textbook on plant and agricultural chemistry Chimica vegetale e agraria which went into several editions from 1931 onwards. He was involved in the founding of the journal Il Giornale di Chimica Industriale.

Menozzi was born in Fogliana (now Reggio Emilia) to farmers Michele and Maria Maestri. He went to the local public school and received a scholarship for the technical institute in Reggio Emilia. Here he was taught by A. Zanelli, P. Spallanzani and others. He joined the higher school of agriculture in Milan in 1873 where he was taught by the organic chemist Guglielmo Koerner. He graduated in 1876 and then worked at the Lodi dairi farm. Here he met Antonietta Anelli whom he later married. He studied enzyme reactions involved in cheese ripening with G. Musso. He was however removed from work and it was only in 1880 that he got a position to teach organic chemistry at the Higher school in Milan under Koerner. In 1900 he was promoted to professor of agricultural chemistry. He worked on soil chemistry, fertilizers, water, silage and other aspects of agriculture. In 1896 he was also director of the agricultural chemistry laboratory which was involved in quality assurance and analysis. In 1914 he succeeded Koerner as director and advised the government on agricultural matters. During World War I he was involved in the management of nutritional needs. After the war he had rebuild the laboratory and school. He examined the problems of soil fertility in the Lombardy moors. In 1925 he established new experimental farms in Landriano (Pavia) which is now called the A. Menozzi educational-experimental farm. He conducted fertilizer experiments and began to use calcium cyanamide in rice paddy fields. He wrote a two-volume manual of agricultural chemistry along with Ugo Pratolongo, first published in 1931 and with several editions. He also wrote a book on fertilizers with Tito Poggi in 1935 that also went into several editions.

Menozzi was made grand officer of the crown of Italy (1921) and in 1926 he was knighted in the Grand Officer of the Order of Saints Maurice and Lazarus. From 1905 to 1913 he was a councillor for the municipality of Milan and in 1929 he was appointed Senator. He was removed from the position on November 29, 1945 following sanctions against fascism.
