= Robert Downs Haworth =

English organic chemist

- Born: 15 March 1898
- Died: 19 May 1990 (aged 92)
- Education: University of Manchester
- Occupation: Chemist
- Employer: University of Sheffield

Robert Downs Haworth (15 March 1898 – 19 May 1990) was an English organic chemist.

== Life ==
Haworth was born in 1898 in Cheadle, then in Cheshire. His father was a school principal. He received his doctorate from Arthur Lapworth in 1922 at the University of Manchester and was a post-graduate student at the University of Oxford with William Henry Perkin Junior. From 1927 he was a professor at the University of Newcastle and from 1939 at the University of Sheffield.

He researched the chemistry of natural products including resins, tannins, and the structure and synthesis of alkaloids.

Haworth phenanthrene synthesis

A variant of the Friedel-Crafts alkylation, the Haworth reaction, is named after him (1932). It creates naphthalene. The related phenanthrene synthesis, the Haworth synthesis (1932), is also named after him.

Haworth reaction

In 1944, he became a Fellow of the Royal Society. In 1956, he received the Davy medal "in recognition of his distinguished contributions to the chemistry of natural products particularly those containing heterocyclic systems".

=== Notable students ===
- Albert Reginald Pinder (Graduate student, 1948, "Investigations in isoquinoline chemistry")
- Peter L. Pauson (Graduate student, 1949)
- Robert E. Davies (Graduate student, 1949)
- Henri Albert Favre (Postdoctoral fellow, 1951-1952)
