= George Joseph Popják =

British biochemist; (1914–1998)

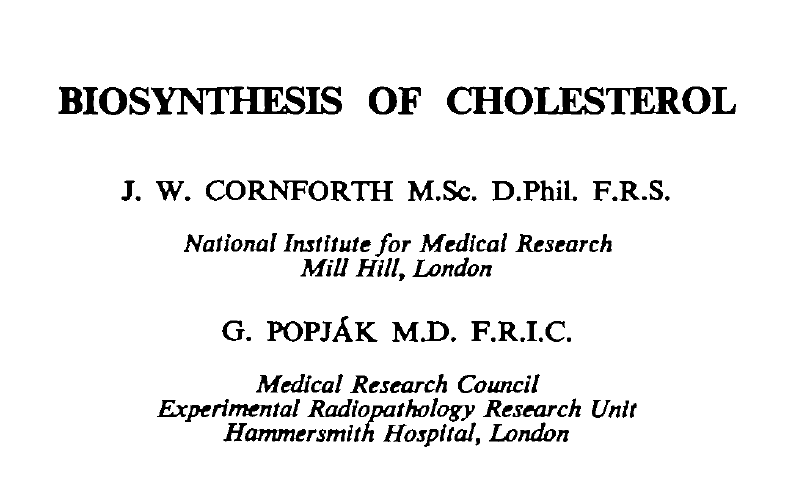
A publication by George Joseph Popják and John Cornforth

George Joseph Popják FRS (György Popják; born 5 May 1914, Kiskundorozsma, Szeged – 30 December 1998, Westwood, Los Angeles) was a Hungarian-British biochemist, medical researcher, and medical school professor.

== Biography ==
George Joseph Popják, whose father was a civil engineer, studied medicine at Franz Joseph University. There he received in 1938 his medical doctorate Sub Auspices Gubernatoris in a special ceremony presided over by a representative of the head of state. The special ceremony, attended by many prominent citizens, began by the university choir singing the national anthem of Hungary, then Popják gave a scientific presentation and was given a special diploma and a gold ring. After graduating with his medical degree, he worked as an anatomy assistant at Franz Joseph University before beginning further training as a pathologist.

Shortly before the start of WW II, Popják left Hungary and went to London on a British Council scholarship. In 1941 George and Hasel Popják were married. After two years as a research assistant in the Department of Pathology of Hammersmith Hospital's Postgraduate Medical School, he was appointed as a lecturer in the Department of Pathology at St Thomas' Hospital Medical School. In 1947 he moved to the National Institute for Medical Research in Mill Hill. From 1953 to 1962 he was the director of the Experimental Radiopathology Research Unit of the Medical Research Council, based at Hammersmith Hospital. From 1962 to 1968 Popják and John W. Cornforth were the co-directors of the Chemical Enzymology Laboratory at Shell Research in Sittingbourne. In 1968 Popják moved to the University of California, Los Angeles (UCLA), where he worked as a professor of biological chemistry and psychiatry. After his retirement in 1984, he continued to do research in the Atherosclerosis Research Unit of UCLA's medical department until shortly before his death. Upon his death he was survived by his widow, who died in 2004 at age 93.

== Research ==
George Joseph Popják, who published around 230 scientific publications during his career, began his biochemical research into lipid metabolism in the 1940s, particularly the biosynthesis of sterols and other lipids. From the early 1950s onwards he concentrated on the investigation of cholesterol biosynthesis. In doing so he used substrates that were radioactively labelled at defined molecular positions.

In this way and through enzymological methods he was able to elucidate the individual reaction steps in the formation of cholesterol together with Konrad Bloch, Feodor Lynen and especially with John W. Cornforth, with whom he worked extensively from 1948 to 1968. In addition, Popják demonstrated that fatty acid synthesis does not take place in the mitochondria as a reversal of β-oxidation, but is based on an independent enzyme system in the cytosol. After moving to UCLA he focused primarily on the regulation of cholesterol biosynthesis.

== Awards and honours ==
- 1954 — The Glycerol Award (USA)
- 1955 — elected a Foreign Member, Royal Flemish Academy of Belgium for Science and the Arts
- 1961 — elected a Fellow of the Royal Society
- 1961 — D.Sc. University of London
- 1965 — nominated (jointly with Conforth) for the Nobel Prize in Chemistry
- 1966 — (jointly with Conforth) CIBA Medal and Prize of the Biochemical Society
- 1967 — (jointly with Cornforth) Stouffer Prize
- 1968 — (jointly with Conforth) Davy Medal of the Royal Society
- 1970 — Harvey Society Lectureship
- 1971 — elected a Fellow of the American Academy of Arts and Sciences
- 1976 — Award in Lipid Chemistry of the American Oil Chemists' Society
- 1977 — elected a Fellow of the New York Academy of Sciences
- 1978 — Vanderbilt University Centennial Medal, Vanderbilt University
- 1979 — Distinguished Scientific Achievement Award from the American Heart Association's Greater Los Angeles Affiliate

== Selected publications ==
=== Articles ===
- Popják, G. (1947). "Synthesis of Phospholipids in the Fœtus". Nature. 160 (4076): 841–842. Bibcode:1947Natur.160..841P. doi:10.1038/160841a0. PMID 20273019.
- Popják, G.; Beeckmans, Marie-Louise (1950). "Extrahepatic lipid synthesis". Biochemical Journal. 47 (2): 233–238. doi:10.1042/bj0470233. PMC 1275193. PMID 14791348.
- Popják, G.; French, T. H.; Folley, S. J. (1951). "Utilization of acetate for milk-fat synthesis in the lactating goat". Biochemical Journal. 48 (4): 411–416. doi:10.1042/bj0480411. PMC 1275342. PMID 14838858.
- Popják, G.; French, T. H.; Hunter, G. D.; Martin, A. J. P. (1951). "Mode of formation of milk fatty acids from acetate in the goat". Biochemical Journal. 48 (5): 612–618. doi:10.1042/bj0480612. PMC 1275384. PMID 14838911.

=== Books ===
- Chemistry, Biochemistry and Isotopic Tracer Technique. The Royal Institute Of Chemistry Lectures, Monographs and Reports, 1955, No.2. London.
- Popják, G.; Le Breton, Élaine, eds. (1956). Biochemical Problems of Lipids; Proceedings of the Second International Congress of Biochemistry, University of Ghent, July 1955. London: Butterworths Scientific Productions; xvi+505 pages,illustrated catalog entry, U.C. Davis Library
- Popják, G., ed. (1960). Biochemistry of lipids; proceedings of the Fifth International Conference on the Biochemical Problems of Lipids, held at the Fourth International Congress of Biochemistry, Vienna, 1958. Oxford; New York: Symposium Publications Division, Pergamon Press. LCCN 60007421.
- Popják, G., ed. (1963). Biosynthesis of Lipids. New York: Macmillan Company.
- Popják György: The Autobiography of George Joseph Popják. Publio Kiadó. 2011. ISBN 978-1-4478-8884-0. catalog entry at Wellcome Collection
- Mead, James F.; Alfin-Slater, Roslyn B.; Howton, David R.; Popják, George (2013). Lipids: Chemistry, Biochemistry, and Nutrition. Springer. ISBN 978-1461292470; 486 pages, illustrated
