= List of fellows of the Royal Society elected in 1953 =

Fellows of the Royal Society elected in 1953.

== Fellows ==
1. John Stuart Anderson
2. Kenneth Bailey
3. Henry Barcroft
4. John Barker
5. John Charles Burkill
6. Sir John Warcup Cornforth
7. Sir Samuel Curran
8. Charles Sutherland Elton
9. Sir Otto Frankel
10. Ernest Gale
11. Alfred Gordon Gaydon
12. Sir Arnold Alexander Hall
13. Geoffrey Wingfield Harris
14. Sir Claude Cavendish Inglis
15. Willis Jackson, Baron Jackson of Burnley
16. Sir James Lighthill
17. George Hoole Mitchell
18. Lionel Sharples Penrose
19. Herbert Marcus Powell
20. Alan Richard Powell
21. Victor Rothschild, 3rd Baron Rothschild
22. David Shoenberg
23. Thomas Wallace
24. David Whitteridge
25. Sir Richard van der Riet Woolley

== Foreign members ==
1. Louis Victor Pierre Raymond de Broglie, Duc de Broglie
2. Robert Courrier
3. Hermann Joseph Muller
4. Wolfgang Ernst Pauli
