= Haworth synthesis =

The Haworth synthesis is a multistep preparation of alkyl-substituted polycyclic aromatic hydrocarbons developed by the British chemist Robert Downs Haworth in 1932.
