= John Cornforth (disambiguation) =

John Cornforth (1917–2013) was an Australian–British chemist and Nobel laureate.

John Cornforth may also refer to:

- John Cornforth (footballer) (born 1967), former Wales international footballer
- John Cornforth (historian) (1937–2004), English architectural historian
