= Herbert Brereton Baker =

English inorganic chemist (1862–1935)

Herbert Brereton Baker FRS CBE
- Baker in 1917
- Born: 25 June 1862; Livesey, England
- Died: 27 April 1935 (aged 72); Gerrards Cross, England
- Education: Balliol College, Oxford
- Awards: Longstaff Medal (1912); Davy Medal (1923)
- Scientific career
- Fields: Inorganic chemistry
- Workplaces: Oxford University; Imperial College London
- Doctoral advisor: Harold Baily Dixon
- Notable students: Harry Julius Emeléus; John Stuart Anderson

Herbert Brereton Baker FRS CBE (25 June 1862 – 27 April 1935) was an English inorganic chemist.

== Early life and education ==
He was born in Livesey, the second son of the Reverend John Baker, vicar of St Johns, Livesey, and Caroline Baker. He was educated locally and at Manchester Grammar School. He secured a Brackenbury scholarship to Balliol College, Oxford, where he was awarded a first-class degree and a Demonstratorship.

== Career and research ==
In 1894 he became a chemistry master at Dulwich College, spending some twenty years in teaching and research, and for a short time (1902–1904) was headmaster of Alleyn's School, Dulwich. During this time he was elected to a Lee's Readership at Christ Church Oxford, becoming responsible for inorganic chemistry lectures at the university. In 1912 he was appointed Professor at Imperial College, replacing Sir T. E. Thorpe as Director of the Chemistry Department; here he remained until retiring in 1932.

He conducted pioneering studies on the effects of drying on chemicals and the catalytic effect of moisture in chemical reactions. According to his 1902 FRS application citation he proved that "dry carbon and phosphorus will not inflame when heated in dry oxygen; that dry ammonia and hydrogen chloride when mixed do not unite, and that dry ammonium chloride and calomel respectively vaporise without dissociation... [and that] dry hydrogen and oxygen mixed together are not ignited by exposure to the temperature of melting silver". He also claimed that complete drying has the effect of significantly raising the boiling temperature of chemicals, but reproducibility of the results could not be achieved. Baker was the Wilde lecturer to the Manchester Literary & Philosophical Society 1909, on the topic of "On the Influence of Moisture on Chemical Change in Gases"

During WWI Baker was appointed scientific adviser to the War Office. He worked with his father-in-law in the development of specially resistant glass for the contact ‘horns’ of submarine mines. Whitefriars Glass produced 600,000 of these glass horns, individually testing them at extremes of temperature, before dropping them to test their strength.

== Family ==
Muriel Baker in 1928

Baker married Muriel Powell, daughter of Harry James Powell, glassmaker, on 21 March 1905 at St Barnabas' Church, Dulwich. They had two children: Ronald Powell Brereton (abt. 1906) and Audrey Muriel (1908). Herbert died on 27 April 1935 at Gerrards Cross. Muriel died in the same town on 15 October 1944, leaving her estate to her unmarried daughter. Their son Ronald predeceased his father.

Muriel Baker had also studied chemistry at Oxford. There, husband and wife jointly studied the oxides of nitrogen, and published a paper together. When Baker moved to Imperial College, they continued to work together in a laboratory at their home in Gerrards Cross.

== Honours and awards ==
He was made Commander of the Order of the British Empire in 1917. In June, 1902, he was elected a Fellow of the Royal Society and in 1923 was awarded their Davy Medal for "his researches on the complete drying of gases and liquids". Baker received the Chemical Society's Longstaff Medal in 1912 and was elected president of the society in 1926.
