= Cornelius O'Sullivan =

- Born: 20 December 1841; Bandon, County Cork, Ireland
- Died: 8 January 1907 (aged 65); Burton-on-Trent, England
- Known for: Carbohydrate research
- Awards: Longstaff Prize (1884); Fellow of the Royal Society

Cornelius O'Sullivan, FRS (20 December 1841 – 8 January 1907) was an Irish brewer's chemist.

He was born the son of merchant James O'Sullivan of Bandon, County Cork and was educated locally, before winning a scholarship to study chemistry at the Royal School of Mines, London.

After completing the three-year course he joined the Royal College of Chemistry as a student assistant to Professor August Wilhelm von Hofmann. When Hofman returned to Germany in 1865 to become Professor of Chemistry in Berlin he took O'Sullivan with him as his assistant. The following year Hofman's influence had secured O'Sullivan the post of assistant brewer and chemist to Messrs. Bass & Co. at Burton-on-Trent, Staffordshire, a major centre for English brewing.

At Bass he applied his chemical knowledge and aptitude for original research to the scientific and practical issues of brewing and ultimately became head of the scientific and analytical staff of the company, a post he held for the rest of his career. His researches were communicated via a series of papers to the Chemical Society. They included On the Transformation Products of Starch (1872 and 1879); On Maltose (1876); On the Action of Malt Extract on Starch (1876); Presence of Raffinose in Barley (1886); Researches on the Gums of the Arabin Group (1884 and 1891); Invertase: a Contribution to the History of an Enzyme (with F. W. Tompson, 1890) and The Identity of Dextrose from Different Sources, with Special Reference to the Cupric Oxide Reducing Power (with A. L. Stern, 1896).

He was elected a fellow of the Chemical Society in 1876, serving on the council from 1882 to 1885, and was awarded the Society's Longstaff Medal in 1884 for his researches on the chemistry of the carbohydrates. In 1885 he was elected a Fellow of the Royal Society, his nomination citation describing him as Distinguished as a chemist, especially for his researches on the Carbohydrates, which have thrown entirely new light on the constitution of this class of bodies and which are therefore of high importance in connexion with the chemistry of vital processes. He was an original member of the Institute of Chemistry, the Society of Chemical Industry and the Institute of Brewing and served on the council of each.

He died at home in Burton-on-Trent in 1907 and was buried near Bandon. He had married in 1871 Edithe, the daughter of Joseph Nadin of Barrow Hall, near Derby, and had three sons (one of whom died in early youth) and one daughter.
