= Frederick George Mann =

British organic chemist

Frederick George Mann FRS
- Born: 29 June 1897; West Norwood, England
- Died: 29 March 1982 (aged 84); Cambridge, England
- Citizenship: United Kingdom
- Education: Cambridge University (PhD 1923, ScD 1932)
- Spouses: Margaret Reid Shackleton; Barbara Thornber
- Children: Shirley Margaret Shackleton; Carola Mary Shackleton; Elizabeth Hilary Frances
- Awards: Tilden Prize (1943)
- Scientific career
- Fields: Organic chemistry
- Institutions: Cambridge University
- Doctoral advisor: William Pope
- Doctoral students: Joseph Chatt

Frederick George Mann FRS (29 June 1897 – 29 March 1982) was a British organic chemist.

== Biography ==
He was the second of four children of William Clarence Herbert Mann, senior civil servant at the Admiralty and Elizabeth Ann (née Casswell) and was born in West Norwood. He attended local primary schools and then the Battersea Polytechnic Secondary School for Boys, where his work was repeatedly reported as 'excellent in every way'.

=== Academic career ===
The school provided direct entry to Battersea Polytechnic, where matriculated students could work for a degree in the University of London. Mann (by now widely known as FG) entered in 1913, aged only 16.

After war service Mann was invited by Sir William Pope to work for a PhD at Downing College, Cambridge which he was awarded in 1923. He continued at Downing as an assistant lecturer until 1930, when he was appointed to a lectureship at Trinity College. He spent his entire academic career at Cambridge, retiring in 1964.

=== Scientific contributions ===
Mann's research spanned a variety of topics, many at the interface between organic and inorganic chemistry, including investigations of aliphatic polyamines, phosphines, arsines and their complexes; heterocyclic compounds of phosphorus and arsenic and their metal complexes; polycyclic nitrogen compounds; the structure and optical properties of transition metal complexes; stereochemistry, and cyanine dyes.

=== Honours and awards ===
He won the Royal Society of Chemistry's Tilden Prize in 1943, and was elected to the Royal Society in 1947.

=== Personal life ===
When FG was appointed to a lectureship at Trinity in 1930 it improved his income, enabling him to marry Margaret Reid Shackleton that year. They had two children: Shirley Margaret Shackleton Mann (b. 1932) and Carola Mary Shackleton Mann (b. 1934).

Margaret died in Cambridge in 1950. FG married Barbara Thornber the following year; she was an organic chemist, specialising in microanalysis, and later personal secretary to Lord Todd. They had a daughter, Elizabeth Hilary Frances Mann, in 1954.

Frederick George Mann suffered from Alzheimer's disease for the last six years of his life; he died in 1982.
