= Davy Medal =

Chemistry award given by the Royal Society

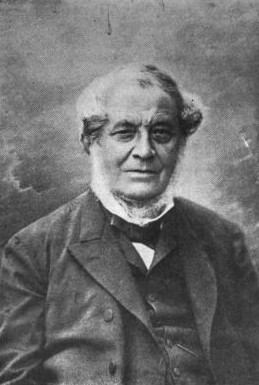

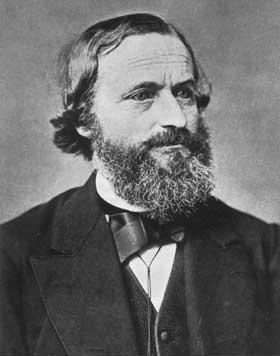
Robert Bunsen and Gustav Kirchhoff, the first recipients of the award. They were awarded the medal "for their researches & discoveries in spectrum analysis".

The Davy Medal is awarded by the Royal Society of London "for an outstandingly important recent discovery in any branch of chemistry". Named after Humphry Davy, the medal is awarded with a monetary gift, initially of £1000 (currently £2000). Receiving the Davy Medal has been identified as a potential precursor to being awarded the Nobel Prize in Chemistry, with 22 scientists as of 2022 having been awarded the medal prior to becoming Nobel laureates, according to an analysis by the Royal Society of Chemistry.

== History ==
The medal was first awarded in 1877 to Robert Wilhelm Bunsen and Gustav Robert Kirchhoff "for their researches & discoveries in spectrum analysis", and has since been awarded 140 times. The medal is awarded annually and, unlike other Royal Society medals (such as the Hughes), has been awarded without interruption since its inception.

The medal has been awarded to multiple individuals in the same year: in 1882, for example, it was awarded to Dmitri Mendeleev and Julius Lothar Meyer "for their discovery of the periodic relations of the atomic weights"; in 1883 to Marcellin Berthelot and Julius Thomsen "for their researches in thermo-chemistry"; in 1893 to Jacobus Henricus van 't Hoff and Joseph Achille Le Bel "In recognition of their introduction of the theory of asymmetric carbon, and its use in explaining the constitution of optically active carbon compounds"; in 1903 to Pierre Curie and Marie Curie "for their researches on radium" and in 1968 to John Cornforth and George Joseph Popják "in recognition of their distinguished joint work on the elucidation of the biosynthetic pathway to polyisoprenoids and steroids".

== List of recipients ==
Source: Royal Society

Year	Name	Rationale	Notes
1877	Robert Wilhelm Bunsen and Gustav Robert Kirchhoff	"For their researches & discoveries in spectrum analysis"	
1878	Louis Paul Cailletet and Raoul Pictet	"For their researches, conducted independently, but contemporaneously, on the condensation of the so-called permanent gases"	
1879	Paul Emile Lecoq de Boisbaudran	"For his discovery of gallium"	
1880	Charles Friedel	"For his researches on the organic compounds of silicon, and other investigations"	
1881	Adolf von Baeyer	"For his synthesis of indigo"	
1882	Dmitri Mendeleev and Lothar Meyer	"For their discovery of the periodic relations of the atomic weights"	
1883	Marcellin Berthelot and Julius Thomsen	"For their researches in thermo-chemistry"	
1884	Adolph Wilhelm Hermann Kolbe	"For his researches in the isomerism of alcohols"	
1885	Jean Servais Stas	"For his researches on the atomic weights"	
1886	Jean Charles Galissard de Marignac	"For his researches on atomic weights"	
1887	John Alexander Reina Newlands	"For his discovery of the periodic law of the chemical elements"	
1888	Sir William Crookes	"For his investigations on the behaviour of substances under the influences of the electric discharge in a high vacuum"	
1889	Sir William Henry Perkin	"For his researches on magnetic rotation in relation to chemical constitution"	
1890	Emil Fischer	"For his discoveries in organic chemistry and especially for his researches on the carbo-hydrates"	
1891	Victor Meyer	"For his researches on the determination of vapour densities at high temperatures"	
1892	Francois Marie Raoult	"For his researches on the freezing points of solutions, and on the vapour pressures of solutions"	
1893	Jacobus Henricus van 't Hoff and Joseph Le Bel	"In recognition of their introduction of the theory of asymmetric carbon, and its use in explaining the constitution of optically active carbon compounds"	
1894	Per Theodor Cleve	"For his researches on the chemistry of the rare earths"	
1895	Sir William Ramsay	"For his share in the discovery of argon, and for his discoveries regarding gaseous constituents of terrestrial minerals"	
1896	Henri Moissan	"For the isolation of fluorine, and the use of the electric furnace in the preparation of refractory metals and their compounds"	
1897	John Hall Gladstone	"For his numerous contributions to chemical science, and especially for his important work in the application of optical methods to chemistry"	
1898	Johannes Wislicenus	"For his contributions to organic chemistry especially in the domain of stereochemical isomerism"	
1899	Edward Schunck	"For his researches on madder, indigo, and chlorophyll"	
1900	Guglielmo Koerner	"For his brilliant investigations on the position theory of the aromatic compounds"	
1901	George Downing Liveing	"For his contributions to spectroscopy"	
1902	Svante Arrhenius	"For the application of the theory of dissociation to the explanation of chemical change"	
1903	Pierre Curie and Marie Curie	"For their researches on radium"	
1904	William Henry Perkin, Jr.	"For his notable discoveries in organic chemistry"	
1905	Albert Ladenburg	"For his researches in organic chemistry, especially in connection with the synthesis of natural alkaloids"	
1906	Rudolf Fittig	"For his investigations in chemistry especially his work on lactones and acids"	
1907	Edward W. Morley	"On the ground of his contributions to physics and chemistry, and especially for his determinations of the relative atomic weights of hydrogen & oxygen"	
1908	William A. Tilden	"On the ground of his discoveries in chemistry, especially on the terpenes and on atomic heats"	
1909	James Dewar	"On the ground of his researches at low temperatures"	
1910	Theodore W. Richards	"On the ground of his researches on the detrmination [sic] of atomic weights"	
1911	Henry Edward Armstrong	"On the ground of his researches in organic and general chemistry"	
1912	Otto Wallach	"On the ground of his researches on the chemistry of the essential oils, and the cyclo-olefines"	
1913	Raphael Meldola	"On the ground of work in synthetic chemistry"	
1914	William Jackson Pope	"On the ground of his important contributions to structural & organic chemistry"	
1915	Paul Sabatier	"For his researches on contact action, and the application of finely divided metals as catalytic agents"	
1916	Henry Louis Le Chatelier	"On the ground of his eminence as a chemist"	
1917	Albin Haller	"On the ground of his important researches in the domain of organic chemistry"	
1918	F. Stanley Kipping	"On the ground of his studies in the camphor group and among the organic derivatives of nitrogen and silicon"	
1919	Percy F. Frankland	"On the ground of his distinguished work in chemistry, especially that on optical activity, and on fermentation"	
1920	Charles T. Heycock	"On the ground of his work in physical chemistry and more especially on the composition & constitution of alloys"	
1921	Philippe A. Guye	"For his researches in physical chemistry"	
1922	Jocelyn Field Thorpe	"For his researches in synthetic organic chemistry"	
1923	Herbert Brereton Baker	"For his researches on the complete drying of gases and liquids"	
1924	Arthur George Perkin	"For his researches on the structure of natural colouring matters"	
1925	James Irvine	"For his work on the constitution of the sugars"	
1926	James Walker	"For his work on the theory of ionisation"	
1927	Arthur Amos Noyes	"For his work in physical chemistry, especially on the subject of electrolytic solutions"	
1928	Frederick George Donnan	"For his contributions to physical chemistry and particularly for his theory of membrane equilibrium"	
1929	Gilbert Newton Lewis	"For his contributions to classical thermodynamics and the theory of valency"	
1930	Robert Robinson	"For his work on the constitution and synthesis of natural products; also for his contributions to the theory of organic reactions"	
1931	Arthur Lapworth	"For his researches in organic chemistry, particularly those connected with tautomerism and the mechanism of organic reactions"	
1932	Richard Willstätter	"For his distinguished researches in organic chemistry"	
1933	William Hobson Mills	"For his researches in organic chemistry, and for his work on the synthesis and properties of the cyanine dyes, and more especially for his investigation of novel types of asymmetric molecules"	
1934	Norman Haworth	"For his researches on the molecular structure of carbohydrates"	
1935	Arthur Harden	"For his distinguished work in biochemistry and especially for his fundamental discoveries in the chemistry of alcoholic fermentation"	
1936	William Arthur Bone	"For his pioneer work on contact catalysis and his researches on the mechanism of combustion of hydrocarbons and on the nature of flames and on gaseous explosions"	
1937	Hans Fischer	"In recognition of his work on the chemistry of the porphyrins, particularly his determination of their detailed structure by degradation and his syntheses of porphyrins of biological importance"	
1938	George Barger	"In recognition of his distinguished researches on alkaloids and other natural products"	
1939	James William McBain	"For having opened up the study of colloidal electrolytes, provided the elements of the guiding theory, and developed the subject"	
1940	Harold C. Urey	"For his isolation of deuterium, the heavy hydrogen isotope, and for his work on this and other isotopes in following the detailed course of chemical reactions"	
1941	Henry Drysdale Dakin	"For his work as a pioneer in biochemical research and especially because of his fundamental contributions to the study of intermediate metabolism"	
1942	Sir Cyril Hinshelwood	"In recognition of his distinguished work on the mechanism of chemical reactions"	
1943	Ian Morris Heilbron	"In recognition of his many notable contributions to organic chemistry, especially to the chemistry of natural products of physiological importance"	
1944	Robert Robertson	"In recognition of his researches on explosives, analytical methods, the internal structure of diamond, and infra-red absorption spectra"	
1945	Roger Adams	"In recognition of his extensive researches in the field of organic chemistry and of his recent work in the alkaloid field"	
1946	Christopher Kelk Ingold	"In recognition of his distinguished work in applying physical methods to problems in organic chemistry"	
1947	Linus Pauling	"In recognition of his distinguished contributions to the theory of valency and for theor [sic] application to systems of biological importance"	
1948	Edmund Langley Hirst	"In recognition of his outstanding work in the determination of the structure of sugars, starches, plant gums and especially of vitamin C"	
1949	Alexander R. Todd	"For his structural synthetic studies and achievements in organic and bio-chemistry, with special reference to vitamins B1 and E and the naturally occurring nucleosides"	
1950	John Simonsen	"For his distinguished researches on the constitution of natural products, especially the plant hydro-carbons and their derivatives"	
1951	Eric Rideal	"For his distinguished contributions to the subject of surface chemistry"	
1952	Alexander Robertson	"In recognition of his researches into the chemistry of natural products, particularly the wide range of glycosides, bitter principles and colouring matters containing heterocyclic oxygen atoms"	
1953	John Lennard-Jones	"For his distinguished work on the applications of quantum mechanics to the theory of valency and to the analysis of the intimate structure of decimal compounds"	
1954	James Wilfred Cook	"For his distinguished fundamental investigations in organic chemistry"	
1955	Harry Work Melville	"In recognition of his distinguished work in physical chemistry and in polymer reactions"	
1956	Robert Downs Haworth	"In recognition of his distinguished contributions to the chemistry of natural products particularly those containing heterocyclic systems"	
1957	Kathleen Lonsdale	"In recognition of her distinguished studies in the structure and growth of crystals"	
1958	Ronald George Wreyford Norrish	"In recognition of his distinguished work in chemical kinetics, especially in photochemistry"	
1959	Robert B. Woodward	"In recognition of his distinguished researches in organic chemistry and particularly for his contributions to the structure and synthesis of natural products"	
1960	John Monteath Robertson	"In recognition of his distinguished pioneering work on the analysis of crystal structure, especially of organic compounds"	
1961	Derek Barton	"In recognition of his distinguished researches in organic chemistry, particularly on the structure and stereochemistry of natural products of the terpene and steroid series; and the analysis of the conformation of cyclic structures"	
1962	Harry Julius Emeléus	"In recognition of his distinguished researches in inorganic chemistry and the discovery and examination of a wide range of new compounds"	
1963	Edmund John Bowen	"In recognition of his distinguished work on the elucidation of photochemical reactions, and for his study of fluorescence and phosphorescence in relation to the molecular processes concerned"	
1964	Melvin Calvin	"In recognition of his pioneering work in chemistry and biology, particularly his elucidation of the photosynthetic pathway for the incorporation of carbon dioxide by plants"	
1965	Harold Warris Thompson	"In recognition of his distinguished contributions to infra-red spectroscopy and its application to chemical problems"	
1966	Ewart Jones	"In recognition of his distinguished contributions to synthetic organic chemistry and to the elucidation of the structures of natural products"	
1967	Vladimir Prelog	"In recognition of his distinguished work in the development of stereochemical concepts and on the structure of alkaloids and antibiotics"	
1968	John Cornforth and George Joseph Popják	"In recognition of their distinguished joint work on the elucidation of the biosynthetic pathway to polyisoprenoids and steroids"	
1969	Frederick Sydney Dainton	"In recognition of his distinguished work on the mechanisms of chemical reactions"	
1970	Charles Alfred Coulson	"In recognition of his distinguished work in theoretical chemistry"	
1971	George Porter	"In recognition of his distinguished contributions to our understanding of chemical reactions"	
1972	Arthur John Birch	"In recognition of his distinguished biosynthetic studies of organic natural products and his development of new reagents for reduction processes"	
1973	John Stuart Anderson	"In recognition of his distinguished contributions to chemistry especially on the structural investigation of imperfect surfaces and non-stoichiometric materials"	
1974	James Baddiley	"In recognition of his distinguished researches on coenzyme A and studies of the constituents of bacterial cell walls"	
1975	Theodore Morris Sugden	"In recognition of his distinguished contributions to physical chemistry including particularly the reactions occurring in flames"	
1976	Rex Edward Richards	"In recognition of his outstanding contributions to nuclear magnetic resonance spectroscopy and its application to chemical and biological problems"	
1977	Alan Rushton Battersby	"In recognition of his outstanding and internationally recognized contributions to biosynthesis – his meticulous and logical unravelling of the complex pathways by which alkaloids and porphyrins are elaborated in vivo"	
1978	Albert Eschenmoser	"In recognition of his distinguished contributions to modern synthetic organic chemistry, well illustrated by his impressive total synthesis of vitamin B12"	
1979	Joseph Chatt	"In recognition of his distinguished contributions to transition metal chemistry and the understanding of catalysis involving ligating molecules such as olefins or dinitrogen"	
1980	Alan Woodworth Johnson	"In recognition of his distinguished contributions to the chemistry of natural products including vitamin B12 porphyrins, plant germination factors and insect hormones and pheromones"	
1981	Ralph Alexander Raphael	"In recognition of his distinguished contributions to organic synthesis and in particular his ingenious applications of acetylenic intermediates"	
1982	Michael James Steuart Dewar	"In recognition of his distinguished studies of the mechanisms of a wide range of chemical reactions based on semi-empirical wave mechanical calculations"	
1983	Duilio Arigoni	"In recognition of his distinguished creativity in the fields of biosynthesis and bioorganic stereochemistry"	
1984	Sam Edwards	"In recognition of his distinguished contributions to the theoretical basis of thermodynamic aspects of polymer chemistry"	
1985	Jack Lewis	"For his outstanding work on the structure and reactivity of metal cluster compounds, including pioneering work on carbido and hydrido derivatives, and pi-donor organic molecules"	
1986	Alexander George Ogston	"In recognition of his early seminal proposal of the ways enzymes deal asymmetrically with symmetrical substrates and his later quantitative analysis of macromolecule interactions which elucidated polymer exclusion effects"	
1987	Alec John Jeffreys	"In recognition of his contributions to the chemistry of human DNA — in particular the discovery and exploitation of hypervariable satellites in the human genome"	
1988	John Pople	"In recognition of his wide-ranging contributions to theoretical chemistry, especially his development and application of techniques for the computation of molecular wave-functions and properties"	
1989	Francis Gordon Albert Stone	"In recognition of his many distinguished contributions to organometallic chemistry, including the discovery that species containing carbon-metal of metal-metal multiple bonds are versatile reagents for synthesis of cluster compounds with bonds between different transition elements"	
1990	Keith Usherwood Ingold	"For pioneering the quantitative study of free radical reactions in solution, in glasses and in living organisms, particularly using electron magnetic resonance"	
1991	Jeremy R. Knowles	"In recognition of his contributions to mechanistic chemistry integrated with enzymology, particularly the application of chemical methods to solve fundamental biological problems of recognition and catalysis"	
1992	Alan Carrington	"Distinguished for the determination and characterization of the molecular spectra of transient species"	
1993	Jack E. Baldwin	"Distinguished for his contributions to bio-organic chemistry, in particular to an understanding of the biosynthesis of beta-lactam antibodies"	
1994	John Meurig Thomas	"For his pioneering studies of solid-state chemistry, and for the major advances he has made in the design of new materials for heterogeneous catalysis"	
1995	M. L. H. Green	"In recognition of his contribution to organometallic chemistry with particular application to catalytic reactions"	—
1996	Geoffrey Wilkinson	"In recognition of his contribution to organotransition metal chemistry and the development of homogeneous catalysis and his work on hydroformylation"	
1997	Jean-Marie Lehn	"In recognition of his work on supramolecular chemistry, on self-assembling molecules and on chemical devices"	—
1998	Alan Roy Fersht	"In recognition for his pioneering work on the analysis of proteins by combining the methods and ideas of physical-organic chemistry with those of protein engineering thus illuminating such processes as enzymatic catalysis, protein folding, protein-protein interactions and those macromolecule interactions in general that are dominated by the chemistry of the noncovalent bond"	
1999	Malcolm H. Chisholm	"In recognition of his leading work in inorganic chemistry, particularly his major impact on the chemistry of transition metals and his pioneering research on the unique triply metal-metal bonded dimolybdenum and ditungsten dialkylamides, alkoxides and alkyls, and for the use of these compounds in further important syntheses"	
2000	Steven Victor Ley	"In recognition of his invention of new synthetic methods applied to the synthesis of complex natural products including those from insects, micro-organisms and plants. Among his most outstanding successes have been the synthesis of avermectin B1a, tetronasin, the milbemycins and indanomycin as well as his important development of short, practical syntheses of oligosaccharides"	
2001	Alastair Ian Scott	"For his pioneering contributions to the understanding of biosynthetic pathways, and in particular for his work on vitamin B12. He is a world leader in his area and the impact of his discoveries are likely to have a significant effect on the way natural product chemistry progresses into the future"	—
2002	Neil Bartlett	"For his research exploring the highest oxidation limits of the less oxidizable elements, primarily using elemental fluorine. [sic] He has exposed the new chemistry of the noble gases and new procedures for attaining high oxidation state limits across the elements of the periodic table"	
2003	Roger Parsons	"For his distinguished career in electochemistry. [sic] He developed the method of preparing, for the first time, clean and well-defined metal surfaces and putting them into contact with the electrolyte without contamination"	
2004	Takeshi Oka	"For his many and varied contributions to molecular spectroscopy and its applications, particularly to astronomy"	
2005	Chris Dobson	"For his work on the application of NMR and other structural methods for studying protein folding and misfolding, especially the formation of amyloid fibrils, leading to novel insights on protein structure and folding"	
2006	Martin Pope	"For his pioneering work in the field of molecular semiconductors which has now become a large and important area of semiconductor science and technology"	
2007	John Simons	"For his many innovative experimental contributions to a broad area of chemical physics, including molecular reaction dynamics, molecular spectroscopy and most recently, biophysical chemistry"	—
2008	James Fraser Stoddart	"For his contributions in molecular technology"	—
2009	Jeremy Sanders	"For his pioneering contributions to several fields, most recently to the field of dynamic combinatorial chemistry at the forefront of supramolecular chemistry"	
2010	Carol Robinson	"For her ground-breaking and novel use of mass spectrometry for the characterisation of large protein complexes."	
2011	Ahmed Zewail	"For his seminal contributions to the study of ultrafast reactions and the understanding of transition states in chemistry, and to dynamic electron microscopy."	
2012	Fraser Armstrong	"For his pioneering protein film electrochemistry allowing exquisite thermodynamic and kinetic control of redox enzymes, exemplified by hydrogenases, key in energy technology."	
2013	Graham Hutchings	"for the discovery of catalysis by gold and for his seminal contributions to this new field of chemistry"	
2014	Clare Grey	"for further pioneering applications of solid state nuclear magnetic resonance to materials of relevance to energy and the environment"	
2015	Gideon John Davies	"for his work in determining the reaction chemistry of enzyme-catalysed carbohydrate transformations"	
2016	Stephen Mann	"for distinguished contributions to the chemistry of bio-mineralization and for pioneering the bio-inspired synthesis and self-assembly of functional nanostructures and hybrid nanoscale objects"	
2017	Matthew Rosseinsky	"his advances in the design and discovery of functional materials, integrating the development of new experimental and computational techniques"	
2018	John Pyle	"pioneering leadership in understanding the depletion of the global ozone layer by halocarbons, particularly coupling between chemistry, radiation, and dynamics, and the special vulnerability of Arctic ozone"	
2019	Varinder Aggarwal	"for his ground-breaking methods coupling boronic esters creating 3-D architectures with full control over shape and functionality with broad ranging applications across the sciences"	
2020	Ben G. Davis	"for inventing powerful chemical methods that directly manipulate complex biological molecules, enabling elucidation and control of biological function and mechanism in vitro and in vivo, beyond the limits of genetics."	
2021	Malcolm Levitt	"for his contributions to the theory and methodology of nuclear magnetic resonance, including composite pulses, symmetry-based recoupling, long-lived nuclear spin states, and the study of endofullerenes byelectromagnetic spectroscopies and neutron scattering."	
2022	Peter Sadler	"for pioneering the research field of medicinal inorganic chemistry, "Metals in Medicine", and the design of new metallodrugs with novel mechanisms of action."	
2023	Margaret Brimble	"for outstanding contributions to organic chemistry with wide-ranging applications across the life sciences."	
2024	Véronique Gouverneur	"for her contributions to the field of fluorine chemistry with applications in both medicine and positron emission tomography imaging."	
2025	Andrew Cooper	"for creating innovative digital approaches to chemistry that combine first-principles computational chemistry, autonomous robots and artificial intelligence."	

== See also ==
- List of chemistry awards
