= Arthur George Perkin =

English chemist (1861–1937)

- Born: 13 December 1861; Sudbury, London
- Died: 30 May 1937 (aged 75); Leeds
- Spouse: Annie Florence Bedford
- Awards: Davy Medal (1924)
- Scientific career
- Fields: Colour Chemistry and Dyeing

Arthur George Perkin DSc FRS FRSE (1861–1937) was an English chemist and Professor of Colour Chemistry and Dyeing at the University of Leeds.

== Life ==
Perkin was the second son of Sir William Henry Perkin FRS, who founded the aniline dye industry, and was born on 13 December 1861 at Sudbury, close to his father's dyeworks at Greenford. His mother was Jemima Harriet Lissett (d.1862). His brother was William Henry Perkin, Jr., FRS, Professor of Chemistry at Manchester and Oxford universities. He was educated at the City of London School (1872–1878). He then studied Chemistry variously at the Royal College of Chemistry in London, Anderson's College in Glasgow, and Leeds University.

In 1893 he was elected a Fellow of the Royal Society of Edinburgh. His proposers were Alexander Crum Brown, Sir Francis Grant Ogilvie, Alexander Buchan and his father, William Henry Perkin.

He died in Headingley on 30 May 1937 and is buried with his wife in Adel Churchyard, in Leeds.

== Family ==
Perkin married Annie Florence Bedford in 1887. They had no children.

== Academic career ==
Perkin entered the Royal College of Chemistry (now part of Imperial College London) in 1878 where he published his first paper at the age of 19. After a year (1880–81) at Anderson's College, Glasgow (now part of the University of Strathclyde), Perkin joined the Dyeing Department at the Yorkshire College, Leeds as a Clothworkers Scholar in 1881. For 10 years from 1882 Perkin worked in industry for Hardman and Holden Ltd in Manchester.

In 1892 Perkin returned to the Yorkshire College as a Lecturer and research chemist. In 1904 the Yorkshire College became the University of Leeds and Perkin was appointed Professor of Colour Chemistry and Dyeing there in 1916. He retired in 1926 with the title Emeritus Professor. In the following year the university awarded him the honorary degree of DSc

== Royal Society ==
Perkin was elected a Fellow of the Royal Society in June 1903 and awarded their Davy Medal in 1924 "for his researches on the structure of natural colouring matters". His candidacy citation for the Royal Society read "Research Chemist in the Clothworker's Dyeing School, Yorkshire College, Leeds. Distinguished for his researches in Organic Chemistry, and especially in the section of this subject which comprises vegetable colouring matters. The results of these researches are published in upwards of 60 papers in the 'Journal of the Chemical Society.' Partly in conjunction with the late Prof J J Hummel he investigated Chay Root, Rubia Sikkimensis, and other similar plants, and succeeded in isolating and clearly proving the constitution of the Anthracene derivatives which they contain. His researches on Mang-kondu, Ventilago madraspatana, and many other plants largely used in India, Java, and elsewhere, on account of their valuable dyeing properties, have not only made us acquainted with the dyeing principles contained in these plants, but their chemical investigation has, in nearly all cases, led to a clear conception of their constitution. During the course of his researches on luteolin, morin, apinin, quercitin, and other flavone compounds, he discovered and investigated curious compounds which such dyestuffs forms with acids. This work has afforded a valuable means of determining the molecular weight of such substances. In another paper he has described a new behaviour of colouring matters, which consists in their forming crystalline potassium salts when treated with potassium acetate. As only colouring matters which contain two hydroxyls relatively in the other position show this behaviour, the test affords further means of determining constitution. His researches include the investigation of the valuable compounds which colouring matters and other substances form with Diazobenzine chloride and the careful examination of the glucosides, tannins, Catechus, and similar compounds closely allied to the natural colouring matters. He has also published important investigations on Resorcylic Acid and its derivatives, on haematein and brazilein, on Kamala, purpurogallin, etc, etc."
