= Norman Haworth =

British chemist (1883–1950)

Sir Norman Haworth
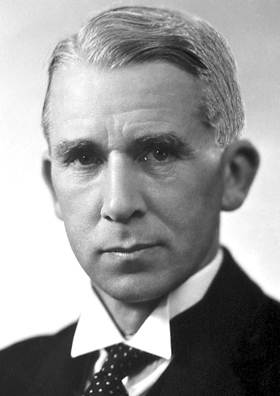
- Norman Haworth
- Born: 19 March 1883; White Coppice, Lancashire, England
- Died: 19 March 1950 (aged 67); Barnt Green, Worcestershire, England
- Education: University of Manchester; University of Göttingen
- Known for: investigations on carbohydrates and vitamin C
- Awards: Longstaff Prize (1933); Davy Medal (1934); Nobel Prize for Chemistry (1937); Royal Medal (1942)
- Scientific career
- Fields: Organic chemistry
- Workplaces: University of St. Andrews; Durham University; University of Birmingham
- Doctoral advisor: William Henry Perkin Jr., Otto Wallach

Sir Walter Norman Haworth FRS (19 March 1883 – 19 March 1950) was a British chemist best known for his groundbreaking work on ascorbic acid (vitamin C) while working at the University of Birmingham. He received the 1937 Nobel Prize in Chemistry "for his investigations on carbohydrates and vitamin C". The prize was shared with Swiss chemist Paul Karrer for his work on other vitamins.

Haworth worked out the correct structure of a number of sugars, and is known among organic chemists for his development of the Haworth projection that translates three-dimensional sugar structures into convenient two-dimensional graphical form.

== Academic career ==
Having worked for some time from the age of fourteen in the local Ryland's linoleum factory managed by his father, he studied for and successfully passed the entrance examination to the University of Manchester in 1903 to study chemistry. He made this pursuit in spite of active discouragement by his parents. He gained his first-class honours degree in 1906. After gaining his master's degree under William Henry Perkin Jr., he was awarded an 1851 Research Fellowship from the Royal Commission for the Exhibition of 1851 and studied at the University of Göttingen earning his PhD in Otto Wallach's laboratory after only one year of study. A DSc from the University of Manchester followed in 1911, after which he served a short time at the Imperial College of Science and Technology as Senior Demonstrator in Chemistry.

In 1912 Haworth became a lecturer at United College of University of St Andrews in Scotland and became interested in carbohydrate chemistry, which was being investigated at St Andrews by Thomas Purdie (1843–1916) and James Irvine (1877–1952). Haworth began his work on simple sugars in 1915 and developed a new method for the preparation of the methyl ethers of sugars using methyl sulfate and alkali (now called Haworth methylation). He then began studies on the structural features of the disaccharides. Haworth organised the laboratories at St Andrews University for the production of chemicals and drugs for the British government during World War I (1914–1918).

He was appointed Professor of Organic Chemistry at the Armstrong College (Newcastle upon Tyne) of Durham University in 1920. The next year Haworth was appointed Head of the Chemistry Department at the college. It was during his time in the North East of England that he married Violet Chilton Dobbie.

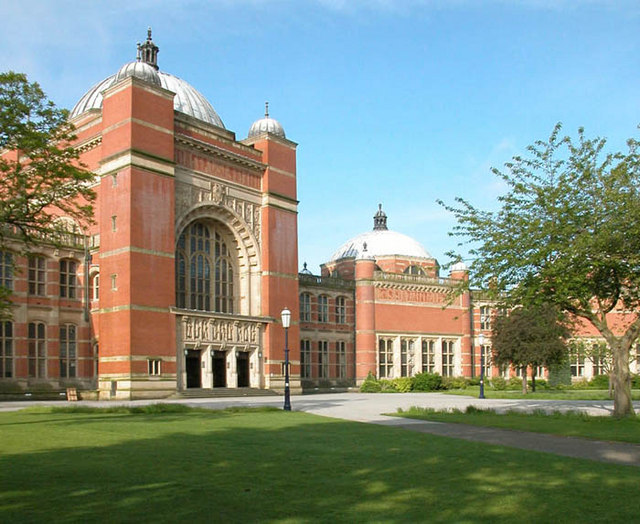
University of Birmingham, England

In 1925 he was appointed Mason Professor of Chemistry at the University of Birmingham (a position he held until 1948). Among his lasting contributions to science was the confirmation of a number of structures of optically active sugars: by 1928, he had deduced and confirmed, among others, the structures of maltose, cellobiose, lactose, gentiobiose, melibiose, gentianose, raffinose, as well as the glucoside ring tautomeric structure of aldose sugars. He published a classic text in 1929, The Constitution of Sugars.

In 1933, working with the then Assistant Director of Research (later Sir) Edmund Hirst and a team led by post-doctoral student Maurice Stacey (who in 1956 rose to the same Mason Chair), having properly deduced the correct structure and optical-isomeric nature of vitamin C, Haworth reported the synthesis of the vitamin. Haworth had been given his initial reference sample of "water-soluble vitamin C" or "hexuronic acid" (the previous name for the compound as extracted from natural products) by Hungarian physiologist Albert Szent-Györgyi, who had codiscovered its vitamin properties along with Charles Glen King, and had more recently discovered that it could be extracted in bulk from Hungarian paprika. In honour of the compound's antiscorbutic properties, Haworth and Szent-Györgyi now proposed the new name of "a-scorbic acid" for the molecule, with L-ascorbic acid as its formal chemical name. During World War II, he was a member of the MAUD Committee which oversaw research on the British atomic bomb project.

== Recognition ==
Haworth is commemorated at the University of Birmingham in the Haworth Building, which houses most of the University of Birmingham School of Chemistry. The School has a Haworth Chair of Chemistry, held by Professor Nigel Simpkins from 2007 until his retirement in 2017, and by Professor Neil Champness since 2021.

In 1977 the Royal Mail issued a postage stamp (one of a series of four) featuring Haworth's achievement in synthesising vitamin C and his Nobel prize.

He also developed a simple method of representing on paper the three-dimensional structure of sugars. The representation, using perspective, now known as a Haworth projection, is still widely used in biochemistry.

== Personal life ==
In 1922 he married Violet Chilton Dobbie, daughter of Sir James Johnston Dobbie. They had two sons, James and David.

He was elected a Fellow of the Royal Society (FRS) in 1928.

He was knighted in the 1947 New Years Honours list.

He died suddenly from a heart attack on 19 March 1950, his 67th birthday.
