= William Jackson Pope =

English chemist (1870–1939)

Sir William Jackson Pope KBE FRS
- Born: 31 March 1870; London, England
- Died: 17 October 1939 (aged 69); Cambridge, England
- Known for: Stereochemistry
- Awards: Longstaff Prize (1903); Davy Medal (1914)
- Scientific career
- Fields: Chemistry
- Doctoral students: F. G. Mann

Sir William Jackson Pope KBE FRS (31 March 1870 – 17 October 1939) was an English chemist.

== Biography ==
William Jackson Pope was born on 31 March 1870 in Hoxton to William (a saddler) and Alice (née Hall). His parents were staunch and active Wesleyans who had eight children, of whom William was the eldest. In 1878 he entered the Central Foundation School, in London, where his ability to learn rapidly gave him leisure at the age of twelve to carry out simple chemical experiments in his bedroom. While at school he also developed great skill as a photographer—many of his early photographs were in perfect condition fifty years later. From there he moved to the Finsbury Technical College, where he learned much from H E Armstrong; the two later became close friends.

Pope studied crystallography under H. A. Miers, and most of his earlier research focussed on measuring crystallographic data with a goniometer. These studies had an important influence on the development of his chemical work, for they enhanced the natural faculty of visualising spatial relationships. This drew him into the field of stereochemistry where his most notable achievements were to resolve a series of asymmetric, optically active compounds of nitrogen, sulfur, tin and selenium. This led to his appointment in 1901 to a chair of chemistry at the Manchester Municipal School of Technology. He was elected a Fellow of the Royal Society (FRS) in June 1902, and then to the 1702 chair of chemistry at Cambridge University in 1908.

During the First World War, Pope served on the Board of Invention and Research for the Admiralty and on the Chemical Warfare Committee at the Ministry of Munitions, where one of his contributions was a modified method for preparing mustard gas. He was appointed a Commander of the Order of the British Empire in the 1918 New Year Honours and was invested as a Knight Commander of the Order of the British Empire in the 1919 New Year Honours, the only chemist to be knighted for service during World War I. Pope was president of the Chemical Society from 1917–19 and of the International Union of Pure and Applied Chemistry (1923–25).

Sir William died, unmarried, in Cambridge on 17 October 1939, after a long illness. A memorial service was held for him at St John’s College Chapel.
