= Alan Stretton =

Australian Army officer (1922–2012)

Alan Bishop Stretton
- Born: 30 September 1922; Melbourne, Victoria
- Died: 26 October 2012 (aged 90); Batemans Bay, New South Wales
- Military career
- Allegiance: Australia
- Branch: Australian Army
- Service years: 1940–1978
- Rank: Major General
- Commands: 2nd Battalion, Royal Australian Regiment (1961–63)
- Conflicts: Second World War; Korean War; Vietnam War
- Awards: Officer of the Order of Australia; Commander of the Order of the British Empire; Distinguished Service Order (Vietnam); Bronze Star Medal (United States)

Alan Stretton

Personal information
- Positions: fullback & ruck

Playing career
Years	Club	Games (Goals)
1946-1947	St Kilda (VFL)	16 (10)
1948	Brighton (VFA)	(unknown)
1955-57	Sorrento (MPFL)	26 (unknown)

Career highlights
- 1948 Premiers (Brighton); 1956 Best & Fairest (Sorrento)

Major General Alan Bishop Stretton, AO, CBE (30 September 1922 – 26 October 2012) was a senior Australian Army officer. He came to public prominence through his work in charge of cleanup efforts at Darwin in the aftermath of Cyclone Tracy on Christmas Day 1974. As head of the National Disasters Organisation he managed the evacuation of 35,000 people in six days, including loading a jumbo jet with 673 passengers, mostly children, then a record for the most people aloft in the one aircraft.

== Early years ==
Stretton was born on 30 September 1922 in Melbourne, Victoria. He was educated at Caulfield Grammar School and Scotch College, Melbourne. After graduating from the Royal Military College, Duntroon, he began his military career serving with the 2/9th Battalion during the Second World War.

== Football ==
In 1946 and 1947 Stretton played 16 games of Australian rules football in the Victorian Football League with St Kilda, after arriving at the club from Duntroon.

== Military career ==
Stretton served in the army from 1940 to 1978. In the Second World War he served as a platoon commander in the 2/9th Battalion.

In the Korean War he served in the 1st Battalion, Royal Australian Regiment from 1954 to 1955. He was appointed a Member of the Order of the British Empire on 13 December 1955. In Malaya he served as the commanding officer of the 2nd Battalion, Royal Australian Regiment (1961–63). On 12 June 1965 he was appointed an Officer of the Order of the British Empire. He served three tours during the Vietnam War, in 1962, 1966 and 1967. He was Director of administrative planning at headquarters (1966–69), and from 1969 to 1970 was chief of staff of the Australian forces. On 8 January 1971 he was advanced to Commander of the Order of the British Empire for his service in Vietnam. In 1970 the South Vietnamese government awarded him the Distinguished Service Order and in 1973 the US awarded him the Bronze Star Medal.

During his time in Malaya and Vietnam, without attending a lecture, he studied by correspondence from the jungle and graduated with a Bachelor of Laws from the University of Queensland in 1966. He was admitted as a barrister in the New South Wales and High Courts in 1969.

Stretton was promoted to brigadier in 1971 and from 1972 to 1974 was deputy director (military) of the Joint Intelligence Organisation and member of the National Intelligence Committee.

== Cyclone Tracy and post-military ==
Stretton was jointly named the 1975 Australian of the Year, with Sir John Cornforth.

He wrote The Furious Days: The Relief of Darwin (1976) and Soldier in the Storm (1978), retiring from public life in 1978. He practiced law in Canberra into his 70s.

In 1999, in only his second visit to the city of Darwin since Cyclone Tracy, he presented his insignia as Officer of the Order of Australia, and his award as Australian of the Year, to the people of Darwin.

In 2003 he publicly criticised the Australian Government's policy of involvement with the 2003 Invasion of Iraq, in an open letter in which he stated: "The alleged connection between Saddam Hussein and al-Qa'ida is ludicrous."

He died on 26 October 2012 at Batemans Bay Hospital in New South Wales, aged 90.

== List of honours ==
Officer of the Order of Australia (AO)	9 June 1975
Commander of the Order of the British Empire (CBE)	8 January 1971
Officer of the order of the British Empire (OBE)	12 June 1965
Member of the Order of the British Empire (MBE)	13 December 1955
Pacific Star	
War Medal 1939–1945	
Australia Service Medal 1939–45	
United Nations Korea Medal	
Vietnam Medal	
Centenary Medal	1 January 2001
Defence Force Service Medal with four clasps	For 35–39 years service
National Medal with 2 Rosettes	For a total of 35 years service
Australian Defence Medal	2006
Vietnam Campaign Medal	(South Vietnam)

== See also ==
- List of Caulfield Grammar School people

== Notes ==
Awards
Preceded by Sir Bernard Heinze	Australian of the Year Award; 1975; Served alongside: Sir John Cornforth	Succeeded by Sir Edward 'Weary' Dunlop
