= Robert Robinson (chemist) =

English chemist and Nobel laureate (1886–1975)

Sir Robert Robinson OM FRS FRSE
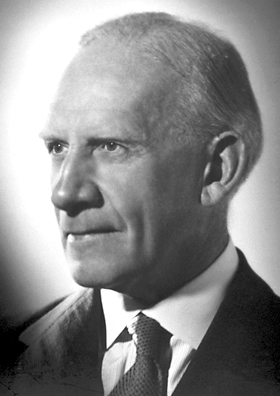

48th President of the Royal Society
- In office 1945–1950
- Preceded by: Sir Henry Hallett Dale
- Succeeded by: Edgar Adrian

Personal details
- Born: 13 September 1886 Derbyshire, England
- Died: 8 February 1975 (aged 88) Great Missenden, Buckinghamshire, England
- Scientific career
- Education: University of Manchester
- Known for: Development of Organic synthesis Arrow pushing Biomimetic synthesis Cholesterol total synthesis Tropinone; Robinson annulation Robinson–Gabriel synthesis Allan–Robinson reaction
- Spouse: Gertrude Maud Robinson
- Awards: Longstaff Prize (1927); Davy Medal (1930); Royal Medal (1932); Copley Medal (1942); Nobel Prize for Chemistry (1947); Franklin Medal (1947); Albert Medal (1947); Faraday Lectureship Prize (1947)
- Fields: Organic chemistry
- Workplaces: University of Sydney; University of Liverpool; British Dyestuffs Corporation; University of Manchester; University College London; University of Oxford
- Doctoral advisor: William Henry Perkin, Jr.
- Doctoral students: Sir Edward Abraham; Arthur John Birch; William Sage Rapson; John Cornforth; Rita Harradence; K. Venkataraman

Sir Robert Robinson OM FRS FRSE (13 September 1886 – 8 February 1975) was a British organic chemist and Nobel laureate recognised in 1947 for his research on plant dyestuffs (anthocyanins) and alkaloids. In 1947, he also received the Medal of Freedom with Silver Palm.

== Biography ==
=== Early life and education ===
He was born at Rufford House Farm, near Chesterfield, Derbyshire the son of James Bradbury Robinson, a maker of surgical dressings, and his wife, Jane Davenport.

Robinson went to school at the Chesterfield Grammar School and the private Fulneck School. He then studied chemistry at the University of Manchester, graduating BSc in 1905. In 1907 he was awarded an 1851 Research Fellowship from the Royal Commission for the Exhibition of 1851 to continue his research at the University of Manchester.

He was appointed as the first Professor of Pure and Applied Organic Chemistry in the School of Chemistry at the University of Sydney in 1912. He then took up the Chair in Organic Chemistry at the University of Liverpool (1915–20) and following this became the Director of Research at the British Dyestuffs Corporation. He was briefly at St Andrews University (1921–22) and then took the Chair of Organic Chemistry at Manchester University, previously held by Arthur Lapworth and William Henry Perkin Jr.. Like Lapworth and Perkin, Robinson presented a paper (The Conjugation of Partial Valencies) to the Manchester Literary and Philosophical Society.

In 1928 he moved from there to be a professor at University College London where he stayed only two years. He was the Waynflete Professor of Chemistry at Oxford University from 1930 and a Fellow of Magdalen College, Oxford.

Robinson was elected an International Member of the United States National Academy of Sciences in 1934, an International Member of the American Philosophical Society in 1944, and an International Honorary Member of the American Academy of Arts and Sciences in 1948.

Robinson Close, in the Science Area at Oxford, is named after him, as is the Robert Robinson Laboratory at the University of Liverpool, the Sir Robert Robinson Laboratory of Organic Chemistry at the University of Manchester and the Robinson and Cornforth Laboratories at the University of Sydney.

Robinson was a strong amateur chess player. He represented Oxford University in a friendly match with a team from Bletchley Park in December 1944; in which he lost his game to pioneering computer scientist I. J. Good. He was president of the British Chess Federation from 1950 to 1953, and with Raymond Edwards he co-authored the book The Art and Science of Chess (Batsford, 1972).

=== Research ===
His synthesis of tropinone (a precursor for atropine & benzatropine) in 1917 was not only a big step in alkaloid chemistry but also showed that tandem reactions in a one-pot synthesis are capable of forming bicyclic molecules.

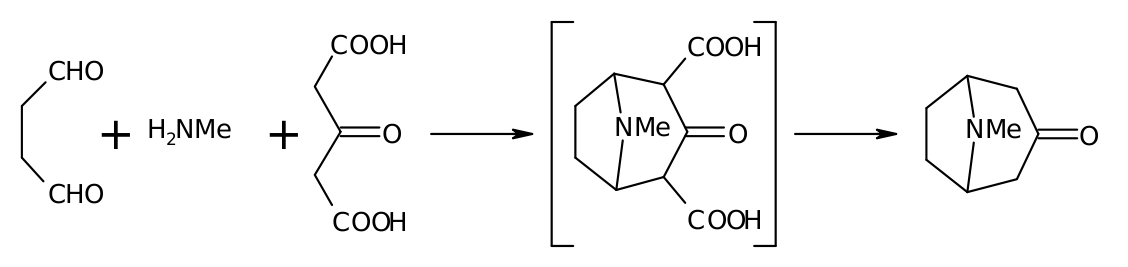
Tropinone synthesis

Robinson created the symbol for benzene with a circle in the middle whilst working at St Andrews University in 1923. He was the first to use curly arrows to represent electron movement. He also discovered the molecular structures of morphine and penicillin. Robinson annulation has had application in the total synthesis of steroids.

Alongside Edward Charles Dodds, Robinson had also been involved in the original synthesis of diethylstilboestrol.

In 1946 he determined the structure of strychnine.

In 1957 Robinson founded the journal Tetrahedron with fifty other editors for Pergamon Press.

== Publications ==
- The Structural Relationship of Natural Products (1955)

== Family ==
Robinson married twice. In 1912 he married Gertrude Maud Walsh. Following her death in 1954, in 1957 he married a widow, Mrs Stern Sylvia Hillstrom (née Hershey).

== See also ==
- List of presidents of the Royal Society

Professional and academic associations
| Preceded by Henry Hallett Dale | 48th President of the Royal Society; 1945–1950 | Succeeded by Edgar Adrian |
