= Longstaff Prize =

The Longstaff Prize is given to a member of the Royal Society of Chemistry who has done the most to advance the science of chemistry. First awarded in 1881, it was originally conferred by the Chemical Society and known as the Longstaff Medal.

== Winners ==
2022	Peter Bruce
2019	Martyn Poliakoff
2016	Paul O'Brien
2013	Steven Ley
2010	Jack Lewis
2008	Jack Baldwin
2005	Alan Carrington
2002	Robert Williams
1999	Raymond Freeman
1996	John Meurig Thomas
1993	Harold Kroto
1990	Gordon Stone
1987	Geoffrey Wilkinson
1984	Alan Battersby
1981	George Porter
1978	Dorothy Hodgkin
1975	John Stuart Anderson
1972	Derek Barton
1969	Ronald Norrish
1966	John Monteath Robertson
1963	Alexander Todd
1960	Eric Rideal
1957	Edmund Hirst
1954	John Lennard-Jones
1951	Christopher Kelk Ingold
1948	Cyril Hinshelwood
1945	Nevil Sidgwick
1942	Hugh Stott Taylor
1939	Ian Heilbron
1936	George Barger
1933	Norman Haworth, James Irvine
1930	William Hobson Mills
1927	Robert Robinson
1924	Frederick George Donnan
1921	Jocelyn Field Thorpe
1918	Arthur William Crossley
1915	Martin Onslow Forster
1912	Herbert Brereton Baker
1909	Frederic Kipping
1906	Walter Noel Hartley
1903	William Jackson Pope
1900	William Henry Perkin Jr.
1897	William Ramsay
1894	Horace Tabberer Brown
1891	Francis Robert Japp
1888	William Henry Perkin
1884	Cornelius O'Sullivan
1881	Thomas Edward Thorpe

== See also ==
- List of chemistry awards
