= Kennedy J. P. Orton =

British chemist

Kennedy Joseph Previté Orton
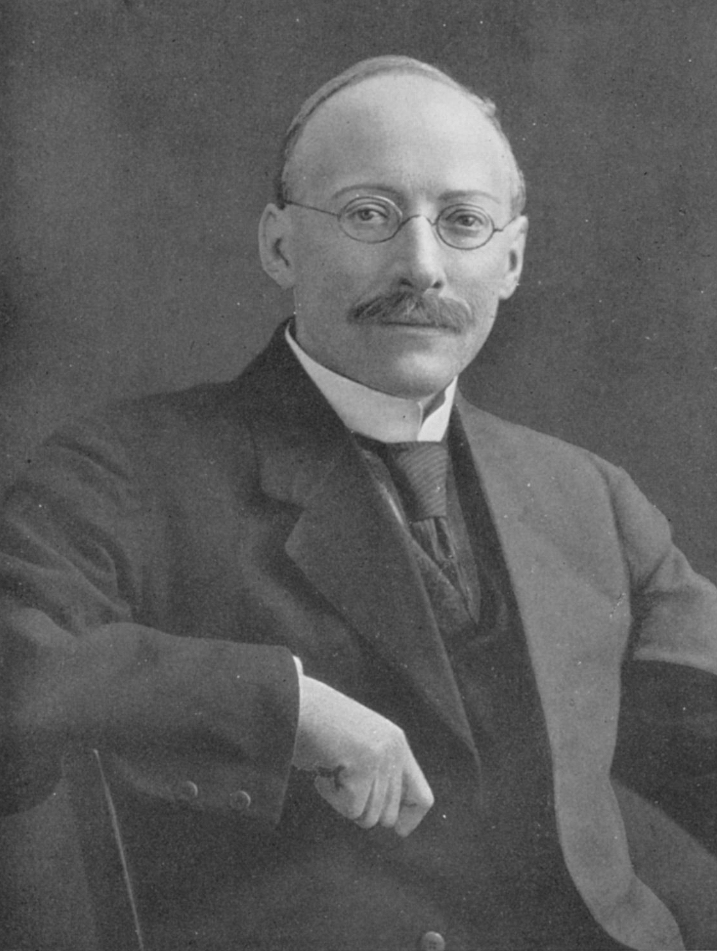
- Born: 21 January 1872; St. Leonard's on Sea
- Died: 16 March 1930 (aged 58); Bangor
- Scientific career
- Fields: Physical Organic Chemistry

Kennedy Joseph Previté-Orton (21 January 1872 – 16 March 1930) was a British chemist who became a lecturer and demonstrator at St Bartholomew's Hospital and then became a professor at Bangor. He was also a keen climber, amateur geologist, ornithologist and bird conservationist.

== Life and work ==
Kennedy Orton was born in St. Leonard's on Sea to clergyman William Previté and Eliza Orton. His grandfather was Italian and the name Previte is a Sicilian form of Prete. Kennedy's father studied at St. John's College Cambridge and was thirty-first wrangler in 1860, becoming a vicar in Leicester. After marrying he took the surname of his wife. Kennedy was the eldest son. He studied at Kibworth Grammar School (1882–1885) and then Wyggeston School, Leicester (1885–1888) before pursuing medicine at St. Thomas' Hospital, but there he became interested in chemistry and moved to St. John's College, Cambridge. He then obtained a Ph.D. summa cum laude in Heidelberg under Karl von Auwers, before working for a year with Sir William Ramsey at University College, London. He was then lecturer and demonstrator of Chemistry at St. Bartholomew's Hospital, working under F. D. Chattaway (1860–1944) who would inspire much of his subsequent research. He would examine N-halogen compounds, reaction mechanisms and equilibria. In 1903 he was appointed Professor of Chemistry at University College of North Wales, Bangor, where he headed the department until his death. After World War I, his department in Bangor became a centre for research in physical organic chemistry. He collaborated with Chattaway on the synthesis and study of nitro-halogen compounds. He worked on reaction mechanisms and kinetics in collaboration with Arthur Lapworth which led to his breaking away from Chattaway. He was elected a Fellow of the Royal Society in 1921. His collaborators and students included Herbert Ben Watson (1894–1975), Alan Edwin Bradfield (1897–1953), Edward David Hughes (1906–1963), Brynmor Jones (1903–1989), Gwyn Williams (1904–1955), and Frederick George Soper (1898–1982).

Besides being a chemist, he was a keen climber, geologist, and bird watcher, and a biannual ornithological lecture was endowed in his name. He married Annie Ley in 1897 and they had a son and two daughters. He died from pneumonia.
