= Rita Cornforth =

Australian biochemist (1915–2012)

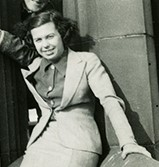
- Cornforth at the University of Sydney
- Born: 16 September 1915; Bexley, New South Wales
- Died: 6 November 2012 (aged 97); Sussex, England
- Resting place: Clayton Wood Natural Burial Ground
- Other name: Lady Cornforth
- Education: University of Sydney (BSc (Hons) 1936, MSc 1937); Somerville College, Oxford (DPhil, 1941)
- Spouse: John Cornforth
- Scientific career
- Workplaces: National Institute for Medical Research; Milstead Laboratory of Chemical Enzymology
- Thesis: Synthesis of cyclic ketones related to the sex hormones (1941)
- Doctoral advisor: Robert Robinson

Rita Harriet Cornforth, Lady Cornforth (16 September 1915 − 6 November 2012) was an Australian–British biochemist who pioneered the synthesis of penicillamine and steroids, and the stereochemistry of molecules involved in the biosynthesis of cholesterol.

== Biography ==
Rita Harriet Harradence was born in Bexley, New South Wales, on 16 September 1915, the daughter of Walter Charles Harradence and his wife Ethel Harriet née Todd. She had brothers, Arthur and Edward. Her father was a carpenter and her mother was a seamstress in a department store. She attended St George Girls High School, an academically selective school for girls, where she excelled, particularly in mathematics. An exceptional teacher, Lilian Whiteoak, sparked an interest in chemistry. When she matriculated in 1933, she was ranked first in New South Wales in chemistry. She also received first class honours in mathematics, and A's in English, French, Latin and mechanics, making her one of the top students in the state.

Harradence won a state scholarship to study chemistry at the University of Sydney, where she earned her BSc honours degree in 1936, topping her class along with Arthur Birch, and an MSc degree in 1937. While there she met John Cornforth, a fellow chemistry student a year behind her. She had broken a Claisen flask and Cornforth, with his expertise of glassblowing and the use of a blowpipe, mended the break. They got to know each other and spent time bushwalking in the Blue Mountains on weekends.

In 1939, Harradence and Cornforth won the two 1851 Research Fellowships awarded to Australians to study in the United Kingdom. They both chose to go to Oxford University to study under Sir Robert Robinson. They departed Sydney on the SS Orama on 6 August 1939. The Second World War broke out while they were crossing the Indian Ocean. At Oxford, they both worked on their doctorates. Harradence wrote hers, under Robinson's supervision, on the "Synthesis of cyclic ketones related to the sex hormones" at Somerville College. Robinson had Harradence and Cornforth synthesise penicillamine. They became engaged in 1941, and were married in the September of that year. They had a son, John, and two daughters, Brenda and Philippa.

There were few research jobs in chemistry in Australia in the early post-war years, so they remained in the United Kingdom. Robinson found them jobs at the National Institute for Medical Research at Hampstead, and later Mill Hill. There, she continued, with John, the research they had begun at Oxford in stereochemistry, investigating the shape of molecules involved in the biosynthesis of cholesterol. She briefly left work after having her second child in 1946, but returned to work, initially part-time, in 1947. In 1962, they moved to Shell's Milstead Laboratory of Chemical Enzymology, where she remained until she retired in 1975. Over the years they published 41 papers together. In his acceptance speech for the 1975 Nobel Prize in Chemistry, John said:

Throughout my scientific career my wife has been my most constant collaborator. Her experimental skill made major contributions to the work; she has eased for me beyond measure the difficulties of communication that accompany deafness; her encouragement and fortitude have been my strongest support.

John was knighted on 10 February 1977, and Rita became Lady Cornforth. The couple both received honorary DSc from the University of Sussex, and the Australian National University established the Rita Cornforth Fellowships for women researchers in chemistry in 1996. The University of Sydney established the Rita and John Cornforth Medal in 2011 to honour academic excellence among PhD graduates. She died on 6 November 2012, after a long illness, at her home in Sussex, with her family around her, and was buried in Clayton Wood Natural Burial Ground. She was survived by her husband (d. 13 December 2013), three children, two grandchildren and four great-grandchildren.
