= Kolavennu =

- Village
- Interactive map of Kolavennu
- Location in Andhra Pradesh, India Kolavennu (India)
- Coordinates: 16.432957°N 80.794474°E
- Country: India
- State: Andhra Pradesh
- District: Krishna
- Named for: KOtlu LAkshalu VElu NoorlU (riches and investment capabilities of people living in the village - funds being available in crores, lakhs, thousands and hundreds)

Area
  - Total: 12.30 km^{2} (4.75 sq mi)

Population (2011)
  - Total: 5,076
  - Density: 412.7/km^{2} (1,069/sq mi)

Languages
  - Official: Telugu
- Time zone: UTC+5:30 (IST)
- PIN: 521153
- Vehicle registration: AP–16
- Lok Sabha constituency: Machilipatnam
- Vidhan Sabha constituency: Penamaluru

Kolavennu is a village in Krishna District of the Indian state of Andhra Pradesh. It is located in Kankipadu mandal of Nuzvid revenue division. It was named after the riches and investment capabilities of people living in the area viz KOtlu LAkshalu VElu NoorlU (crores, lakhs, thousands, hundreds).

A Brief History Of the Kammas, p. 96: https://archive.org/details/brief-history-of-the-kammas/page/96/mode/2up

History of Bezwada Bar, pp 23-24: https://archive.org/details/history-of-bezwada-bar-1975-d.-v.-sivarao/page/23/mode/2up

Sivaram Prasad, Rewind and Replay, p. 11

the most famous son of kolavennu has ever risen until now Rao bahdur kovelamudi Gopalakrishnayya Garu whose youngest son is Bhaskar films Bhaskar Rao and grand sons kanchukota narayana rao and kancharla Madha Rao who were early parties in Telugu industry growth story.

Kolavennu has some of earliest producers of Telugu Talkie Kovelamudi bhaskar rao followed by Kancharla Narayana rao who is also a film distributor Premier films, Jyothi films and Kancharla Madhav Rao. A S R Anjaneyulu producer of Pandavavanavasam also hails from this place. Atisit Mikkilineni hails from Kolavennu.This is also the village where Producer Dr. D. Ramanaidu has built a Ganapathi Temple which is shown in Suresh Productions movies' intro banner.

== Geography ==
Kolavennu is located at 16.4500°N 80.7833°E. It has an average elevation on 6m (22 feet) d while digging). Ramalayam and Anjaneya temples were built at later stage.

== Temples ==
The village has ancient temples such as Shivalayam built by Maddali Lakshmipathy Rayudu in 1878 (7 February 1878). It is a rare sphatika shivalingam which has a phani and Ardhanariswara carving, Vishnalayam and also Ramalayam. Anjaneya temples were built at later stage.
