= John Cornforth =

Australian-British chemist (1917–2013)

Sir John Cornforth AC CBE FRS FAA
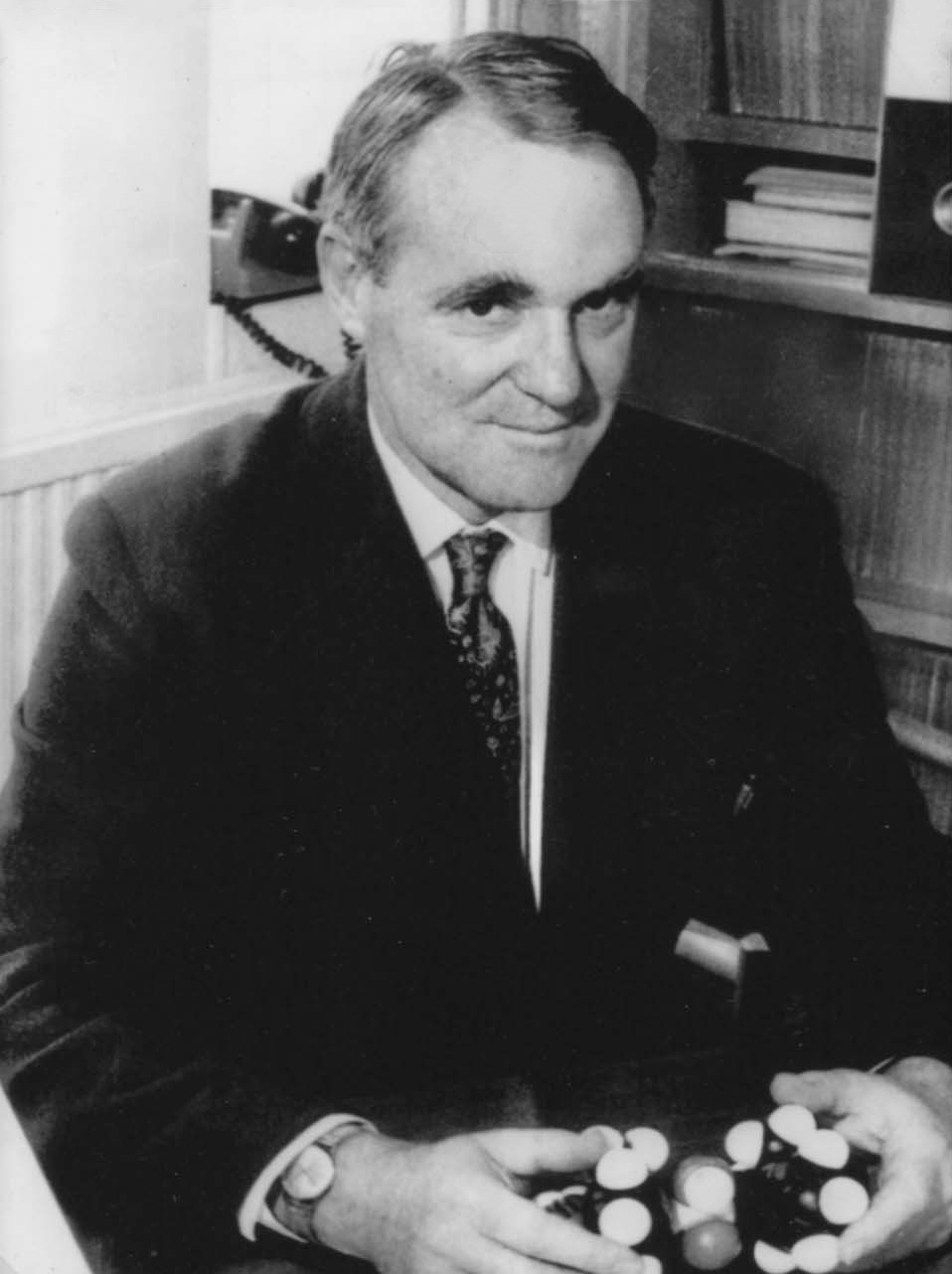
- Cornforth in 1975
- Born: John Warcup Cornforth Jr. 7 September 1917; Sydney, New South Wales, Australia
- Died: 8 December 2013 (aged 96); Sussex, England
- Citizenship: Australian; British
- Education: University of Sydney (BSc); St Catherine's College, Oxford (DPhil)
- Known for: Stereochemistry of enzyme-catalysed reactions Cholesterol total synthesis Cornforth reagent Cornforth rearrangement
- Spouse: Rita Harradence
- Awards: Corday–Morgan Medal (1953); Davy Medal (1968); Ernest Guenther Award (1969); Nobel Prize in Chemistry (1975); Royal Medal (1976); Copley Medal (1982)
- Scientific career
- Fields: Organic chemistry
- Workplaces: University of Oxford; University of Warwick; University of Sussex
- Thesis: Synthesis of analogues of steroid hormones (1941)
- Doctoral advisor: Robert Robinson

Sir John Warcup Cornforth Jr., AC, CBE, FRS, FAA (7 September 1917 – 8 December 2013) was an Australian–British chemist who won the Nobel Prize in Chemistry in 1975 for his work on the stereochemistry of enzyme-catalysed reactions, becoming the only Nobel laureate born in New South Wales.

Cornforth investigated enzymes that catalyse structural changes in organic substrates by replacing specific hydrogen atoms within their chains and rings. In his syntheses and descriptions of the structure of various terpenes, olefins, and steroids, Cornforth determined precisely which hydrogen atoms were displaced by an enzyme to drive a given transformation, allowing him to detail the biosynthesis of cholesterol. For this work, he won the Nobel Prize in Chemistry in 1975 with Vladimir Prelog, and was knighted in 1977.

== Early life and family ==
Born in Sydney, Cornforth was the son and the second of four children of English-born, Oxford-educated schoolmaster and teacher John Warcup Cornforth and Hilda Eipper (1887–1969), a granddaughter of pioneering missionary and Presbyterian minister Christopher Eipper. Before her marriage, Eipper had been a maternity nurse.

Cornforth was raised in Sydney as well as Armidale, in the north of New South Wales, where he undertook primary school education.

At about 10 years old, Cornforth had noted signs of deafness, which led to a diagnosis of otosclerosis, a disease of the middle ear which causes progressive hearing loss. This left him completely deaf by the age of 20 but also fatefully influenced his career direction away from law, his original intended field of study, and towards chemistry. In an interview with Sir Harry Kroto for the Vega Science Trust, Cornforth explained:

I had to find something in which the loss of hearing would not be too severe a handicap...I chose chemistry...The most liberating thing was the realization that the literature wasn't entirely correct. It gave me quite a shock at first, and then a thrill. Because I can set this right!

== Education ==
Cornforth was educated at Sydney Boys' High School, where he excelled academically, passed tests in English, mathematics, science, French, Greek, and Latin, and was inspired by his chemistry teacher, Leonard ("Len") Basser, to change his career directions from law to chemistry. Cornforth graduated as the dux of the class of 1933 at Sydney Boys' High School, at the age of 16.

In 1934, Cornforth matriculated and studied at the University of Sydney, where he studied organic chemistry at the University of Sydney's School of Chemistry and from which he graduated with a Bachelor of Science with First-Class Honours and the University Medal in 1937. During his studies, his hearing became progressively worse, thus making listening to lectures difficult. At the time, he could not use hearing aids as the sound became distorted, and he did not significantly use lip reading.

While studying at the University of Sydney, Cornforth met his future wife, fellow chemist and scientific collaborator, Rita Harradence. Harradence was a graduate of St George Girls High School and a distinguished academic achiever who had topped the state in Chemistry in the New South Wales Leaving Certificate Examination. Harradence graduated with a Bachelor of Science with First-Class Honours and the University Medal in Organic Chemistry in 1936, a year ahead of Cornforth. Harradence also graduated with a MSc in 1937, writing a master's thesis titled "Attempts to synthesise the pyridine analogue of vitamin B1".

In 1939, Cornforth and Harradence, independently of each other, each won one of two Science Research Scholarships (the 1851 Research Fellowship) from the Royal Commission for the Exhibition of 1851, tenable overseas for two years. At the University of Oxford, Harradence was a member of Somerville College while Cornforth was at St. Catherine's College and they worked with Sir Robert Robinson, with whom they collaborated for 14 years. During his time at Oxford, Cornforth found working for and with Robinson stimulating, and the two often deliberated to no end until one had a cogent case against the other's counterargument. In 1941, Cornforth and Harradence both graduated with a D.Phil. in Organic Chemistry. At the time, there were no institutions or facilities at which a PhD in chemistry could be done in Australia.

== Career ==
After his arrival at Oxford and during World War II, Cornforth significantly influenced the work on penicillin, particularly in purifying and concentrating it. Penicillin is usually very unstable in its crude form; as a consequence of this, researchers at the time were building upon Howard Florey's work on the drug. In 1940, Cornforth and other chemists measured the yield of penicillin in arbitrary units to understand the conditions that favoured penicillin production and activity, and he contributed to the writing of The Chemistry of Penicillin.

In 1946, the Cornforths, who had by now married, left Oxford and joined the Medical Research Council (MRC), working at the National Institute for Medical Research (NIMR), where they continued on earlier work in synthesising sterols, including cholesterol. The Cornforths' collaboration with Robinson continued and flourished. In 1951, they completed, simultaneously with Robert Burns Woodward, the first total synthesis of the non-aromatic steroids. At the NIMR, Cornforth collaborated with numerous biological scientists, including George Popják, with whom he shared an interest in cholesterol. Together, they received the Davy Medal in 1968 in recognition of their distinguished joint work on the elucidation of the biosynthetic pathway to polyisoprenoids and steroids.

While working at the MRC, Cornforth was appointed a professor at the University of Warwick and was employed there from 1965 to 1971.

In 1975, Cornforth was awarded a share of the Nobel Prize in Chemistry, alongside Vladimir Prelog. In his acceptance speech, Cornforth said:

Throughout my scientific career my wife has been my most constant collaborator. Her experimental skill made major contributions to the work; she has eased for me beyond measure the difficulties of communication that accompany deafness; her encouragement and fortitude have been my strongest support.

Also in 1975, he moved to the University of Sussex in Brighton as a Royal Society Research Professor. Cornforth remained there as a professor and was active in research until his death.

== Personal life ==
In 1941, the year in which they graduated from the University of Oxford, Cornforth married Rita Harriet Harradence (b. 1915), with whom he had one son, John, and two daughters, Brenda and Philippa. Cornforth had met Harradence after she had broken a Claisen flask in their second year at the University of Sydney; Cornforth, with his expertise of glassblowing and the use of a blowpipe, mended the break. Rita Cornforth died on 6 November 2012, at home with her family around her, following a long illness.

On an important author or paper that was integral to his success, Cornforth stated that he was particularly impressed by the works of German chemist Hermann Emil Fischer.

Cornforth died in Sussex on 8 December 2013. at the age of 96. Cornforth is survived by his three children and four grandchildren. He was a sceptic and an atheist.

== Honours and awards ==
Cornforth was named the Australian of the Year in 1975, jointly with Maj. Gen. Alan Stretton. In 1977, Cornforth was recognised by his alma mater, the University of Sydney, with the award of an honorary Doctor of Science. Cornforth's other awards and recognitions follow:

- Davy Medal (1968; jointly with George Joseph Popják)
- Elected a Fellow of the Royal Society (FRS) in 1953
- Commander of the Order of the British Empire (CBE; 1972)
- Nobel Prize in Chemistry (1975)
- Royal Medal (1976)
- Knight Bachelor (1977)
- Corresponding Fellow of the Australian Academy of Science (1977)
- Foreign member of the Royal Netherlands Academy of Arts and Sciences (since 1978)
- Copley Medal (1982)
- Companion of the Order of Australia (AC; 1991)
- Centenary Medal (2001)

Cornforth's certificate of election for the Royal Society reads:

Distinguished as an Organic Chemist of outstanding originality and exceptional experimental skill, particularly in microchemical manipulation. He was the first to attribute the correct constitution to penicillamine and to synthesise the amino-acid. After making significant contributions to the synthesis of penicillin he notably developed the chemistry of the oxazole group and made oxazole itself for the first time.

The important share he took in the total synthesis of androgenic hormones and other steroids is gratefully recognised by all his collaborators in the investigation.

Miscellaneous work on natural products and chemotherapy equally displays individual thought, invention, and superlative technical accomplishment.

== Popular culture ==
Cornforth was the focus of a skit on an episode of Comedy Inc., whereby a fictional Who Wants to Be A Millionaire? contestant (played by Genevieve Morris) is asked "Which Australian scientist won the Nobel Prize for Chemistry in 1975?" for the million-dollar question. As it happens, the contestant gleefully claims they are second cousins with Cornforth (despite being nearly 50 years his junior) and knows Cornforth is the answer, confidently rattling off a bunch of highly specific and esoteric facts about Cornforth's life and achievements, all the while the host (a satirical portrayal of Eddie McGuire) stubbornly and continuously stalls her for dramatic effect, asking her for several minutes if she'd like to think about it more to an absurd degree.

On 7 September 2017, Google celebrated his 100th birthday with a Google Doodle.

The Royal Australian Chemical Institute (RACI) honours Cornforth by naming its prize for the best PhD thesis in chemical science completed at an Australian university the Cornforth Medal.
