= Wilhelm Körner =

German chemist (1839–1925)

Wilhelm Körner (Guglielmo Körner)
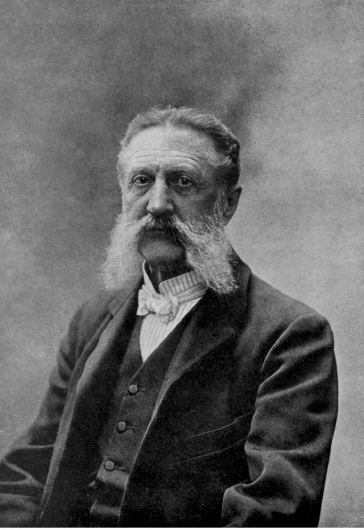
- Wilhelm Körner
- Born: April 20, 1839; Cassel, Germany
- Died: March 29, 1925 (aged 85); Milan, Italy
- Education: University of Giessen
- Awards: Davy Medal (1900)
- Scientific career
- Workplaces: University of Palermo, Scuola Superiore di Agricoltura (University of Milan)

Wilhelm Körner, later a.k.a. Guglielmo Körner (April 20, 1839 in Cassel – March 29, 1925 in Milan), was a German chemist.

== Life ==
Körner studied chemistry at Giessen, where he graduated in 1860. In 1866, he became assistant to Kekulé at Ghent. In 1867, when Kekulé was called to Bonn, Körner left Ghent for Palermo where entered the laboratory of Stanislao Cannizzaro, and occupied himself with the study of the aromatic compounds. Besides his work on aromatic compounds, his interest in botany led him to the study of many vegetable substances. In 1870, he accepted the chair of organic chemistry at "Scuola Superiore di Agricoltura" ("School of Agriculture", University of Milan), where he retained until 1922, when for reasons of health he resigned his chair at the age of 83.

== Works ==
- Koerner, Guglielmo (1869). Fatti per servire alla determinazione del luogo chimico nelle sostanze aromatiche. Palermo: F. Lao.
- Koerner, Guglielmo (1869). Synthese d'une base isomere à la toluidine. Palermo.
- Koerner, Guglielmo (1874). Studj sull'isomeria delle cosi dette sostanze aromatiche a sei atomi di carbonio, comunicazione dal laboratorio di chimica organica della Regia Scuola superiore di agricoltura in Milano. Milano: Scuola superiore di agricoltura.
- Koerner, Guglielmo (1875). Intorno a due acidi benzobisolforici ed ai loro rapporti con altri composti. Presentata da Polli Giovanni. Milano: Bernardoni.
- Koerner, Wilhelm (1882). Die Grundzuge der ungarischen Sprache. Berlin: Weidmann.
- Koerner, Guglielmo (1887). Lezioni di Chimica organica. Raccolte da Alfredo Gilardi e Niccolo Baseggio. Milano: Tipografia Litografica Minotti Ernesto.
- Koerner, Guglielmo (1888). Ricerche sulla composizione e costituzione della siringina, un glucoside della syringa vulgaris. Milano: Tipografia Bernardoni di C. Rebeschini.
- Koerner, Wilhelm (1910). Uber die Bestimmung des chemischen Ortes bei den aromatischen Substanzen : vier Abhandlungen. Aus dem Franzosischen und Italienischen ubersetzt und herausgegeben von G. Bruni und B. L. Vanzetti. Leipzig: Engelmann.
- Koerner, Guglielmo (1910). Pubblicazioni raccolte ed ordinate in occasione del 50° anniversario della sua laurea. Milano: Tipografia degli Operai.
- La determinazione del luogo chimico nei composti cosi detti aromatici : l'opera classica di Guglielmo Koerner. Milano: Tipografia degli operai. 1910.
- Koerner, Guglielmo (1911). L'industria chimica in Italia nel cinquantennio (1861-1910). Roma: Tipografia della Regia Accademia dei Lincei.
- Koerner, Guglielmo (1913). Dinitroderivati delle benzine metadialogenate. Roma: Tipografia della Regia Accademia Dei Lincei.
- Koerner, Guglielmo (1913). Paranitroaniline ortoalogenate e loro derivati. Roma: Tipografia della Regia Accademia Dei Lincei.
- Koerner, Guglielmo (1914). Benzine nitrosostituite ottenute dai corrispondenti aminoderivati. Roma: Tipografia della Regia Accademia Dei Lincei.
- Koerner, Guglielmo (1915). Il quinto trinitrotoluene ε e prodotti dinitroalogeno sostituti corrispondenti. Roma: Tipografia della Regia Accademia dei Lincei.
- Koerner, Guglielmo (1915). Analisi qualitativa : Appunti presi alle Lezioni del prof. Guglielmo Koerner nel Regio Politecnico e nella Regia Scuola superiore di agricoltura di Milano nell'aa 1913-4. Varese: Tipografia A. Nicola e C.
- Koerner, Guglielmo (1916). Il sesto trinitro-toluene e prodotti dinitro-alogeno sostituiti corrispondenti. Roma: Tipografia della Regia Accademia Dei Lincei.
