= Arthur Birch (organic chemist) =

Australian organic chemist (1915–1995)

Arthur John Birch
- Born: 3 August 1915; Sydney, Australia
- Died: 8 December 1995 (aged 80); Canberra, Australia
- Citizenship: Australia
- Education: University of Sydney; University of Oxford
- Known for: Birch reduction
- Awards: Fellow of the Royal Society (1958); Ernest Guenther Award (1963); Davy Medal (1972); Matthew Flinders Medal and Lecture (1972); Tetrahedron Prize (1987); ANZAAS Medal (1990)
- Scientific career
- Fields: Organic chemistry
- Workplaces: Australian National University; University of Cambridge; University of Sydney
- Doctoral advisor: Robert Robinson

John Birch, AC CMG FRS FAA (3 August 1915 – 8 December 1995) was an Australian organic chemist.

Birch developed the Birch reduction of aromatic rings (by treatment with lithium metal and ammonia) which is widely used in synthetic organic chemistry. The Birch Reduction enables the modification of steroids. In 1948 Birch published the first total synthesis of a male sex hormone (19-nortestosterone), as the first member of a new structural series. This series later comprised the first oral contraceptive pill, which was made by others. The Birch reduction also allows for the development of other steroid drugs and antibiotics – he also made the first simple synthesis of the ring A-B structure of cholesterol. Birch published over 440 scientific papers and reports. According to Scopus database on 2025-12-03 Birch's h-index was 43.

== Early life and education ==
Birch won a scholarship to attend the University of Sydney graduating with a BSc in 1937 and a MSc in 1938. He travelled to the University of Oxford to undertake his D.Phil., graduating in 1940.

== Career ==
The hormone research he became involved with in 1940 was initiated by the RAF who then believed German fighter pilots were given cortical hormones He remained a research Fellow at Oxford until 1948 working under Sir Robert Robinson, when he became the Smithson Fellow at the University of Cambridge where he remained until 1952. At Cambridge he worked with Lord Todd.

He returned to Australia in 1952 to take up a Professorship in organic chemistry at the University of Sydney, he was made a fellow of the Australian Academy of Science in 1954. He held his position at the University of Sydney until 1955 when he took a similar position at Manchester University. He was made a Fellow of the Royal Society in 1958.

Birch returned to Australia again in 1967 to establish the Research School of Chemistry at the Australian National University in Canberra, becoming its founding dean. He remained involved with the school until 1980. He served as President of the Royal Australian Chemical Institute from 1977 to 1978, and also chaired the 1977 Independent Inquiry into CSIRO.

He served as President of the Australian Academy of Science from 1982 to 1986. Birch was made a Companion of the Order of Australia (AC) in 1987 for his contributions to science in Australia. He was awarded Honorary Fellowship of the Royal Australian Chemical Institute, in 1994. He was also a founding member of the Australian Science and Technology Council.

Before his death in 1995, the Research School of Chemistry building at ANU was named the "Birch Building" in his honour.
