= Arthur Lapworth =

Scottish chemist

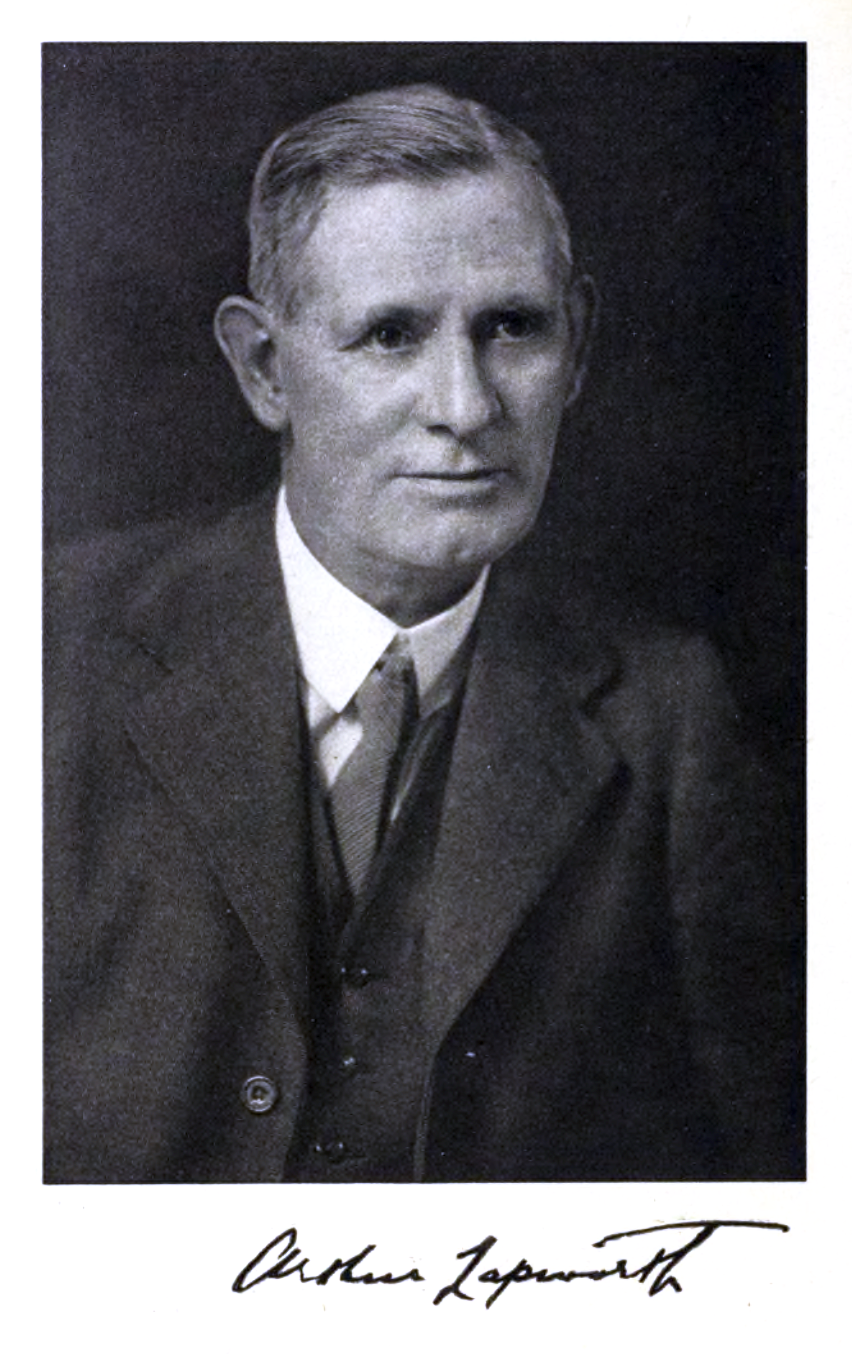

Arthur Lapworth FRS (10 October 1872 – 5 April 1941) was a Scottish chemist. He studied the mechanisms and kinetics of organic reactions. His most cited work was on the bromination of acetone published in 1904. He served as a professor of inorganic and physical chemistry at the University of Manchester.

== Life and work ==
Lapworth was born in Galashiels, Scotland, the son of geologist Charles Lapworth, a professor at Mason College, Birmingham. He educated at St Andrew's and King Edward VI Five Ways School, Birmingham. He then graduated in chemistry from Mason College (later Birmingham University). From 1893 to 1895 he worked on a scholarship at the Central Technical College City and Guilds of London Institute on the chemistry of camphor and camphene with F. S. Kipping and with H. E. Armstrong on the sulfonation of ethers of b-naphthol. He received a DSc for his work on naphthalene.

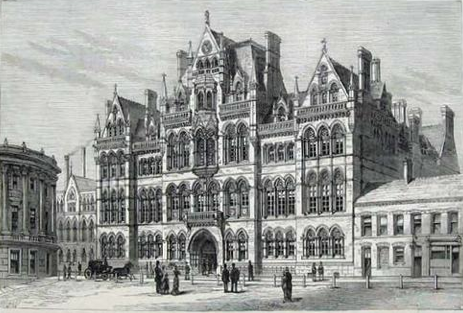
Mason Science College, now the University of Birmingham

His first post, in 1895, was as a demonstrator in the School of Pharmacy, University of London in Bloomsbury. He became head of the chemistry department of Goldsmiths Institute, and in 1909 became senior lecturer in inorganic and physical chemistry at the University of Manchester. He was elected to membership of the Manchester Literary and Philosophical Society on 18 October 1910. In 1913 he was appointed professor of organic chemistry succeeding W. H. Perkin Jr.; and in 1922, the Sir Samuel Hall Professor (of inorganic and physical chemistry) and director of laboratories. This move enabled a former colleague Robert Robinson to rejoin Manchester from St Andrews University and succeed him as professor of organic chemistry.

He was a pioneer of the field of physical organic chemistry. His proposal for the reaction mechanism for the benzoin condensation is the basis for our modern-day understanding of organic chemistry.

He retired in 1935 and was appointed Professor Emeritus. He was elected a Fellow of the Royal Society in May 1910, and was awarded their Davy Medal in 1931. Lapworth was also an Hon. LL.D. of Birmingham and of St Andrews universities.

Lapworth was a keen cello and violin player. His father had played the piano while his mother and sister were singers. He served on the council of the Royal Manchester College of Music. He also took a keen interest in microscopy and was a specialist on the mosses. He enjoyed carpentry, geology, climbing, fishing and was introduced to birdwatching by Kennedy J. P. Orton. He married Kathleen Florence Holland (a sister of hers married the chemist F. S. Kipping while another was married to the chemist W. H. Perkin) at St Mary, Bridgwater on 14 September 1900. Arthur Lapworth retired in 1935 and died on 5 April 1941 in a nursing home in Withington.
