= Royal Society Bakerian Medal =

- Awarded for: For outstanding contributions to science
- Sponsored by: The Royal Society
- Date: 1922
- Location: London
- Country: United Kingdom
- First award: 1775
- Website: royalsociety.org/grants-schemes-awards/awards/bakerian-lecture/

Precedence
- Next (higher): Copley Medal
- Equivalent: Croonian Medal (biological sciences)
- Next (lower): Royal Medal (Commonwealth or Irish citizens or residents only); Foreign Member of the Royal Society (ForMemRS, international)

The Bakerian Medal is one of the premier medals of the Royal Society that recognizes exceptional and outstanding science. It comes with a medal award and a prize lecture. The medalist is required to give a lecture on any topic related to physical sciences. It is awarded annually to an individual in a field of the physical sciences, including computer science.

== History ==
The prize was started in 1774, when Henry Baker left £100 to establish a spoken lecture given by a Fellow of the Royal Society about natural history or experimental philosophy.

== Awardees ==
=== 21st century ===
- 2026 John A. Rogers, for foundational scientific and engineering contributions to the field of bioelectronics
- 2025 Ingrid Daubechies, for her outstanding work on wavelets and image compression and her exceptional contributions to a wide spectrum of physical, technological, and mathematical applications
- 2024 Michele Dougherty, for her scientific leadership of the Cassini magnetic field instrument at Saturn, seminal research findings on potential life support on Enceladus and leadership of forthcoming missions to probe Jupiter’s icy moons
- 2023 Andrew Zisserman, for research on computational theory and commercial systems for geometrical analysis of images, and for being a pioneer and leading scientist in machine learning for vision, especially image recognition
- 2022 Michelle Simmons, for seminal contributions to our understanding of nature at the atomic-scale by creating a sequence of world-first quantum electronic devices in which individual atoms control device behaviour
- 2021 Victoria Kaspi, for her research focused on neutron stars and their utility for constraining basic physics
- 2020 Sir James Hough, for his world-leading work on suspensions systems for the test masses used in laser interferometry, pivotal to the successful detection of gravitational waves.
- 2019 Edward Hinds, for his achievements in controlling individual atoms, molecules and photons.
- 2018 Susan Solomon, her contributions in atmospheric science especially on polar ozone depletion.
- 2017 Andrew Hopper, for his work in computer networking and sentient computing systems.
- 2016 Andrea Ghez, "The monster at the heart of our galaxy"
- 2015 John Ellis, "The Long Road to the Higgs Boson—and Beyond"
- 2014 Lynn Gladden, "It’s magnetic resonance—but not as you know it"
- 2013 David Leigh, "Making the tiniest machines"
- 2012 Peter Edwards, "Metals and the conducting and superconducting states of matter"
- 2011 Herbert Huppert, "Carbon storage: caught between a rock and climate change"
- 2010 Donal Bradley, "Plastic electronics: their science and applications"
- 2009 James Murray, "Mathematics in the real world: From brain tumours to saving marriages".
- 2008 Robin Clark, "Raman microscopy, pigments and the arts/science interface"
- 2007 Joseph Silk, "The dark side of the Universe"
- 2006 Athene Donald, "The mesoscopic world - from plastic bags to brain disease - structural similarities in physics"
- 2005 John Pendry, "Negative refraction, the perfect lens and metamaterials"
- 2004 Michael Pepper, "Semiconductor nanostructures and new quantum effects"
- 2003 Christopher Dobson, "Protein folding and misfolding: from theory to therapy"
- 2002 Arnold Wolfendale, "Cosmic rays: what are they and where do they come from?"
- 2001 David Sherrington, "Magnets, microchips, memories and markets: statistical physics of complex systems".

=== 20th century ===
- 2000 Steve Sparks, "How volcanoes work".
- 1999 Peter Day, "The molecular chemistry of magnets and superconductors".
- 1998 Richard Ellis, "The morphological evolution of the galaxies".
- 1997 Steven Ley, "Sweet dreams: new strategies for oligosaccharide assembly".
- 1996 A. Ian Scott, "Genetically engineered synthesis of natural products".
- 1995 Anthony Kelly, "Composites, towards intelligent materials design".
- 1994 John Polanyi, "Photochemistry in the adsorbed state, using light as a scalpel and a crystal as an operating table".
- 1993 Hans Bethe, "Mechanism of supernovae".
- 1992 Thomas Benjamin, "The mystery of vortex breakdown".
- 1991 John Houghton, "The predictability of weather and climate".
- 1990 John Meurig Thomas, "New microcrystalline catalysts".
- 1989 Jack Lewis, "Cluster compounds, a new aspect of inorganic chemistry".
- 1988 Walter Eric Spear, "Amorphous semiconductors, a new generation of electronic materials".
- 1987 Michael Victor Berry, "The semiclassical chaology of quantum eigenvalues".
- 1986 Walter Heinrich Munk, "Ships from space" (paper) and "Acoustic monitoring of ocean gyres" (talk).
- 1985 Carlo Rubbia, "Unification of the electromagnetic and weak forces".
- 1984 Alan Rushton Battersby, "Biosynthesis of the pigments of life".
- 1983 Alfred Edward Ringwood, "The Earth's core: its composition, formation and bearing upon the origin of the earth".
- 1982 Martin John Rees, "Galaxies and their nuclei".
- 1981 Robert Joseph Paton Williams, "Natural selection of the chemical elements".
- 1980 Abdus Salam, "Gauge unification of fundamental forces".
- 1979 Michael Ellis Fisher, "Multicritical points in magnets and fluids: a review of some novel states of matter. "
- 1978 Robert Lewis Fullarton Boyd, "Cosmic exploration by X-rays".
- 1977 George Porter, "In vitro models for photosynthesis".
- 1976 George Wallace Kenner, "Towards synthesis of proteins".
- 1975 Michael Francis Atiyah, "Global geometry".
- 1974 Desmond George King-Hele, "A view of Earth and air".
- 1973 Frederick Charles Frank, "Crystals imperfect".
- 1972 Dorothy Mary Crowfoot Hodgkin, "Insulin".
- 1971 Basil John Mason, "The physics of the thunderstorm".
- 1970 Derek Harold Richard Barton, "Some approaches to the synthesis of tetracycline".
- 1969 Richard Henry Dalitz, "Particles and interactions: the problems of high-energy physics"
- 1968 Fred Hoyle, "Review of recent developments in cosmology"
- 1967 Edward Crisp Bullard, "Reversals of the Earth's magnetic field"
- 1966 Ronald George Wreyford Norrish, "The progress of photochemistry exemplified by reactions of the halogens"
- 1965 Melvin Calvin, "Chemical evolution"
- 1964 Frederic Calland Williams, "Inventive technology: the search for better electric machines"
- 1963 Alan Howard Cottrell, "Fracture"
- 1962 John Desmond Bernal, "The structure of liquids"
- 1961 Michael James Lighthill, "Sound generated aerodynamically"
- 1960 Gerhard Herzberg, "The spectra and structures of free methyl and free methylene".
- 1959 Edmund Langley Hirst, "Molecular structure in the polysaccharide group".
- 1958 Martin Ryle, "The nature of the cosmic radio sources".
- 1957 Cecil Frank Powell, "The elementary particles".
- 1956 Harry Work Melville, "Addition polymerization".
- 1955 Marcus Laurence Elwin Oliphant, "The acceleration of charged particles to very high energies".
- 1954 Alexander Robertus Todd, "Chemistry of the nucleotides".
- 1953 Nevill Francis Mott, "Dislocations, plastic flow and creep in metals".
- 1952 Harold Jeffreys, "The origin of the solar system".
- 1951 Eric Keightley Rideal, "Reactions in monolayers".
- 1950 Percy Williams Bridgman, "Physics above 20 000 kg/cm2".
- 1949 Harold Raistrick, "A region of biosynthesis".
- 1948 George Paget Thomson, "Nuclear explosions".
- 1947 Harry Ralph Ricardo, "Some problems in connexion with the development of a high-speed diesel engine".
- 1946 Cyril Norman Hinshelwood, "The more recent work on the hydrogen-oxygen reaction".
- 1945 Gordon Miller Bourne Dobson, "Meteorology of the lower stratosphere".
- 1944 Walter Norman Haworth, "The structure, function and synthesis of polysaccharides".
- 1943 Richard Vynne Southwell, "Relaxation methods: a mathematics for engineering sciences".
- 1942 Albert Charles Chibnall, "Amino-acid analysis and the structure of proteins".
- 1941 Paul Adrien Maurice Dirac, "The physical interpretation of quantum mechanics".
- 1940 Nevil Vincent Sidgwick & Herbert Marcus Powell, "Stereochemical types and valency groups".
- 1939 Patrick Maynard Stuart Blackett, "Penetrating Cosmic Rays".
- 1938 Christopher Kelk Ingold, "The Structure of Benzene".
- 1937 Edward Victor Appleton, "Regularities and Irregularities in the Ionosphere".
- 1936 Frederic Stanley Kipping, "Organic Compounds of Silicon".
- 1935 Ralph Howard Fowler, "The Anomalous Specific Heats of Crystals, with special reference to the Contribution of Molecular Rotations".
- 1934 William Lawrence Bragg, "The Structure of Alloys".
- 1933 James Chadwick, "The Neutron".
- 1932 William Arthur Bone, "The Combustion of Hydrocarbons".
- 1931 Sydney Chapman, "Some Phenomena of the Upper Atmosphere".
- 1930 Robert Robinson, "The Molecular Structure of Strychnine and Brucine".
- 1929 Edward Arthur Milne, "The Structure and Opacity of a Stellar Atmosphere".
- 1928 John Cunningham McLennan, "The Aurora and its Spectrum".
- 1927 Francis William Aston, "A New Mass-Spectrograph and the Whole Number Rule".
- 1926 Arthur Stanley Eddington, "Diffuse Matter in Interstellar Space".
- 1925 William Bate Hardy & Ida Bircumshaw," Boundary Lubrication - Plane Surfaces and the Limitations of Amontons Law".
- 1924 Alfred Fowler, "The Spectra of Silicon at Successive Stages of Ionization".
- 1923 Geoffrey Ingram Taylor & Constance F. Elam, "The Distortion of an Aluminium Crystal during a Tensile Test".
- 1922 Thomas Ralph Merton & S. Barratt, "On the Spectrum of Hydrogen".
- 1921 Thomas Martin Lowry & Percy Corlett Austin, "Optical Rotatory Dispersion. Part II. Tartaric Acid and the Tartrates".
- 1920 Ernest Rutherford, "Nuclear Constitution of Atoms".
- 1919 Robert John Strutt, "A Study of the Line Spectrum of Sodium as Excited by Fluorescence".
- 1918 Charles Algernon Parsons, "Experiments on the Artificial Production of Diamond".
- 1917 James Hopwood Jeans, "The Configurations of Rotating Compressible Masses".
- 1916 Charles Glover Barkla, "X-rays and the Theory of Radiation".
- 1915 William Henry Bragg, "X-rays and Crystals".
- 1914 Alfred Fowler, "Series Lines in Spark Spectra".
- 1913 Joseph John Thomson, "Rays of Positive Electricity".
- 1912 Hugh Longbourne Callendar, "On the Variation of the Specific Heat of Water, with Experiments by a new Method".
- 1911 Robert John Strutt, "A Chemically-Active Modification of Nitrogen Produced by the Electric Discharge".
- 1910 John Henry Poynting & Guy Barlow, "The Pressure of Light against the Source: the Recoil from Light".
- 1909 Joseph Larmor, "On the Statistical and Thermo-dynamical Relations of Radiant Energy".
- 1908 Charles Herbert Lees, "The Effects of Temperature and Pressure on the Thermal Conductivities of Solids".
- 1907 Thomas Edward Thorpe, "The Atomic Weight of Radium".
- 1906 John Milne, "Recent Advances in Seismology".
- 1905 Horace Tabberer Brown, "The Reception and Utilization of Energy by the Green Leaf".
- 1904 Ernest Rutherford, "The Succession of Changes in Radio-active Bodies".
- 1903 Charles Thomas Heycock & Francis Henry Neville, "On the Constitution of the Copper-tin Series of Alloys".
- 1902 Lord Rayleigh," On the Law of the Pressure of Gases between 75 and 150 Millimetres of Mercury".
- 1901 James Dewar, "The Nadir of Temperature and Allied Problems".
- 1900 William Augustus Tilden, "On the Specific Heat of Metals and the Relation of Specific Heat to Atomic Weight".

=== 19th century ===
- 1899 James Alfred Ewing & Walter Rosenhain, "The Crystalline Structure of Metals".
- 1898 William James Russell, "Further Experiments on the Action exerted by certain Metals and other Bodies on a Photographic Plate".
- 1897 Osborne Reynolds & William Henry Moorby, "On the Mechanical Equivalent of Heat".
- 1896 William Chandler Roberts-Austen, "On the Diffusion of Metals".
- 1895 Augustus George Vernon Harcourt & William Esson, "On the Laws of Connexion between the Conditions of a Chemical Change and its Amount. III. Further Researches on the Reaction of Hydrogen Dioxide and Hydrogen Iodide".
- 1894 Thomas Edward Thorpe & James Wyllie Rodger, "On the Relations between the Viscosity of Liquids and their Chemical Nature".
- 1893 Harold Baily Dixon, "The rate of Explosion in Gases".
- 1892 James Thomson, "On the Grand Currents of Atmospheric Circulation".
- 1891 George Howard Darwin, "On Tidal Prediction".
- 1890 Arthur Schuster, "The Discharge of Electricity through Gases. Preliminary Communication".
- 1889 Arthur William Rucker & Thomas Edward Thorpe, "A magnetic Survey of the British isles for the Epoch January 1, 1886".
- 1888 J. Norman Lockyer, "Suggestions on the Classification of the various Species of Heavenly Bodies. A Report to the Solar Physics Committee".
- 1887 Joseph John Thomson, "On the Dissociation of some Gases by the Electric Discharge".
- 1886 William de Wiveleslie Abney & Edward Robert Festing, "Colour Photometry".
- 1885 William Huggins, "On the Corona of the Sun".
- 1884 Arthur Schuster, "Experiments on the Discharge of Electricity through gases. Sketch of a Theory".
- 1883 William Crookes," On Radiant Matter Spectroscopy: the Detection and wide Distribution of Yttrium".
- 1882 Heinrich Debus, "On the Chemical Theory of Gunpowder".
- 1881 John Tyndall, "Action of free Molecules on Radiant Heat, and its conversion thereby into sound".
- 1880 William de Wiveleslie Abney, "On the Photographic Method of Mapping the least refrangible end of the Solar Spectrum".
- 1879 William Crookes, "On the Illumination of Lines of Molecular Pressure and the Trajectory of Molecules".
- 1878 William Crookes, "On Repulsion resulting from Radiation. Part V".
- 1877 William Crawford Williamson, "On the Organization of the Fossil Plants of the Coal Measures".
- 1876 Thomas Andrews, "On the Gaseous State of Matter".
- 1875 William Grylls Adams, "On the Forms of Equipotential Curves and Surfaces and on Lines of Flow".
- 1874 J. Norman Lockyer, "Researches in Spectrum Analysis in connexion with the Spectrum of the Sun. Part III".
- 1873 Earl of Rosse, "On the Radiation of Heat from the Moon, the Law of its Absorption by our Atmosphere, and its variation in Amount with her Phases".
- 1872 William Kitchen Parker, "On the Structure and Development of the Skull of the Salmon".
- 1871 Charles William Siemens, "On the Increase of Electrical Resistance in Conductors with Rise of Temperature, and its Application to the Measure of Ordinary and Furnace Temperatures".
- 1870 John William Dawson, "On the Pre-Carboniferous Flora of North-Eastern America, and more especially on that of the Erian (Devonian) Period".
- 1869 Thomas Andrews, "The Continuity of the Gaseous and Liquid States of Matter".
- 1868 Henry Enfield Roscoe, "Researches on Vanadium".
- 1867 Frederick Augustus Abel, "Researches on Gun-Cotton. (Second Memoir). On the Stability of Gun-Cotton".
- 1866 James Clerk Maxwell, "On the Viscosity or Internal Friction of Air and other Gases".
- 1865 Henry Enfield Roscoe, "On a Method of Meteorological Registration of the Chemical Action of Total Daylight".
- 1864 John Tyndall, "Contributions to Molecular Physics: being the Fifth Memoir of Researches on Radiant Heat".
- 1863 Henry Clifton Sorby, "On the Direct Correlation of Mechanical and Chemical Forces".
- 1862 Warren De la Rue, "On the Total Solar Eclipse of 18 July 1860, observed at Rivabellosa, near Miranda de Ebro in Spain".
- 1861 John Tyndall, "On the Absorption and Radiation of Heat by Gases and Vapours, and on the Physical Connexion of radiation, Absorption and Conduction".
- 1860 William Fairbairn, "Experimental Researches to determine the Law of Superheated Steam".
- 1859 Edward Frankland, "Researches on Organo-metallic Bodies. Fourth Memoir".
- 1858 John Peter Gassiot, "On the Stratifications and dark band in Electrical Discharges as observed in Torricellian Vacua".
- 1857 Michael Faraday, "Experimental Relations of Gold (and other metals) to Light".
- 1856 William Thomson, "On the Electro-dynamic Qualities of Metals".
- 1855 John Tyndall, "On the Nature of the Force by which Bodies are repelled from the Poles of a Magnet; to which is prefixed an account of some experiments on Molecular Influences".
- 1854 Thomas Graham, "On Osmotic Force".
- 1853 Edward Sabine, "On the Influence of the Moon on the Magnetic Declination at Toronto, St Helena, and Hobarton".
- 1852 Charles Wheatstone, "Contributions to the Physiology of Vision. Part II. On some remarkable and hitherto unobserved Phenomena on Binocular Vision (continued)".
- 1851 Michael Faraday, "Experimental Researches in Electricity. Twenty-Fourth Series".
- 1850 Thomas Graham, "On the Diffusion of Liquids".
- 1849 Michael Faraday, "Experimental Researches in Electricity. Twenty-Second Series".
- 1848 Revd William Whewell, "Researches on the Tides. Thirteenth Series. On the Tides of the Pacific, and on the Diurnal Inequality".
- 1847 William Robert Grove, "On certain Phenomena of Voltaic Ignition and the Decomposition of Water into its constituent Gases by Heat".
- 1846 James David Forbes, "Illustrations of the Viscous Theory of Glacier Motion".
- 1845 Charles Giles Bridle Daubeny, "Memoir on the Rotation of Crops, and on the Quantity of Inorganic Matters abstracted from the Soil by various Plants under different circumstances".
- 1844 Richard Owen, "A Description of certain Belemnites, preserved, with a great proportion of their soft parts, in the Oxford Clay, at Christian-Malford, Wilts".
- 1843 Charles Wheatstone, "An Account of several new Instruments and Processes for determining the Constants of a Voltaic Circuit".
- 1842 James David Forbes, "On the Transparency of the Atmosphere and the Law of Extinction of the Solar Rays in passing through it".
- 1841 George Newport, "On the Organs of Reproduction and the Development of the Myriapoda".
- 1840 George Biddell Airy, "On the Theoretical Explanation of an apparent new Polarity of Light".
- 1839 William Snow Harris, "Inquiries concerning the Elementary Laws of Electricity".
- 1838 James Ivory, "On the Theory of the Astronomical Refractions".
- 1837 William Henry Fox Talbot, "Further Observations on the Optical Phenomena of Crystals".
- 1836 John William Lubbock, "On the Tides of the Port of London".
- 1835 Charles Lyell, "On the Proofs of a gradual Rising of the Land in certain parts of Sweden".
- 1834 Not appointed
- 1833 Samuel Hunter Christie, "Experimental Determination of the Laws of Magneto-Electric Induction in different masses of the same metal, and its intensity in different metals".
- 1832 Michael Faraday, "Experimental Researches in Electricity; Second Series".
- 1831 No record of lecture
- 1830 No record of lecture
- 1829 Michael Faraday, "On the manufacture of Glass for Optical Purposes".
- 1828 William Hyde Wollaston, "On a Method of rendering Platina malleable".
- 1827 George Pearson, "Researches to discover the Faculties of Pulmonary Absorption with respect to Charcoal".
- 1826 Humphry Davy, "On the Relations of Electrical and Chemical Changes".
- 1825 No record of lecture
- 1824 No record of lecture
- 1823 John F.W. Herschel, "On certain Motions produced in Fluid Conductors when transmitting the Electric Current".
- 1822 No record of lecture
- 1821 Edward Sabine, "An Account of Experiments to determine the Amount of the Dip of the Magnetic Needle in London, in August 1821; with Remarks on the Instruments which are usually employed in such determination".
- 1820 Henry Kater, "On the best kind of Steel, and form, for a Compass Needle".
- 1819 William Thomas Brande, "On the Composition and Analysis of the inflammable Gaseous Compounds resulting from the destructive Distillation of Coal and Oil; with some Remarks on their relative heating and illuminating power".
- 1818 No record of lecture
- 1817 No record of lecture
- 1816 No record of lecture
- 1815 No record of lecture
- 1814 No record of lecture
- 1813 William Thomas Brande, "On some new Electro-Chemical Phenomena".
- 1812 William Hyde Wollaston, "On the Elementary Particles of certain Crystals".
- 1811 Humphry Davy (?)
- 1810 Humphry Davy, "On some of the Combinations of Oxymuriatic Gas and Oxygen, and on the Chemical Relations of these Principles to Inflammable Bodies".
- 1809 Humphry Davy, "On some new Electro-Chemical Researches, on various objects, particularly the Metallic Bodies from the Alkalies and Earths; and on some Combinations of Hydrogen".
- 1808 Humphry Davy, "An Account of some new Analytical Researches on the Nature of certain Bodies, particularly the Alkalies, Phosphorus, Sulphur, Carbonaceous Matters, and the Acids hitherto undecompounded; with some general Observations on Chemical Theory".
- 1807 Humphry Davy, "On some new Phenomena of Chemical Changes produced by Electricity, particularly the Decomposition of the fixed Alkalies, and the Exhibition of the new Substances, which constitute their Bases".
- 1806 Humphry Davy, "On some Chemical Agencies of Electricity".
- 1805 William Hyde Wollaston, "On the Force of Percussion".
- 1804 Samuel Vince, Observations on the Hypotheses which have been assumed to account for the cause of Gravitation from Mechanical Principles.
- 1803 Thomas Young, "Experiments and Calculations relative to Physical Optics".
- 1802 William Hyde Wollaston, "Observations on the Quantity of Horizontal Refraction; with Method of measuring the Dip at Sea".
- 1801 Thomas Young, "On the Theory of Light and Colours".
- 1800 Thomas Young, "On the Mechanism of the Eye".

=== 18th century ===
- 1799 Samuel Vince (?)
- 1798 Samuel Vince, "Observations upon an unusual Horizontal Refraction of the Air; with Remarks on the Variations to which the lower Parts of the Atmosphere are sometimes subject".
- 1797 Samuel Vince, "Experiments upon the Resistance of Bodies moving in Fluids".
- 1796 Samuel Vince (?)
- 1795 Samuel Vince (?)
- 1794 Samuel Vince, "Observations on the Theory of the Motion and Resistance of Fluids; with a Description of the Construction of Experiments, in order to obtain some fundamental Principles".
- 1793 George Fordyce, "An Account of a New Pendulum".
- 1792 Tiberius Cavallo, "An Account of the Discoveries concerning Muscular Motion, which have been lately made, and are commonly known by the name of Animal Electricity".
- 1791 Tiberius Cavallo, "On the Method of Measuring Distances by means of Telescopes furnished with Micrometers".
- 1790 Tiberius Cavallo, "A Description of a new Pyrometer".
- 1789 Tiberius Cavallo, "Magnetical Experiments and Observations".
- 1788 Tiberius Cavallo, "On an Improvement in the Blow Pipe".
- 1787 Tiberius Cavallo, "Of the Methods of manifesting the Presence, and ascertaining the Quality, of small Quantities of Natural or Artificial Electricity".
- 1786 Tiberius Cavallo, "Magnetical Experiments and Observations".
- 1785 Tiberius Cavallo, "Magnetical Experiments and Observations".
- 1784 Tiberius Cavallo, "An Account of some Experiments made with the new improved Air Pump".
- 1783 Tiberius Cavallo, "Description of an improved Air Pump".
- 1782 Tiberius Cavallo, "An Account of some Experiments relating to the Property of Common and Inflammable Airs of pervading the Pores of Paper".
- 1781 Tiberius Cavallo, "An Account of some Thermometrical Experiments".
- 1780 Tiberius Cavallo, "Thermometrical Experiments and Observations".
- 1779 John Ingen-Housz, "Improvements in Electricity".
- 1778 John Ingen-Housz, "Electrical Experiments to explain how far the Phenomena of the Electrophorus may be accounted for by Dr Franklins Theory of Positive and Negative Electricity".
- 1777 Peter Woulfe
- 1776 Peter Woulfe
- 1775 Peter Woulfe, "Experiments made in order to ascertain the nature of some Mineral Substances, and in particular to see how far the Acids of Sea-Salt and of Vitriol contribute to Mineralize Metallic and other Substances".
