= James Charles Philip =

British physical chemist

- Born: 12 February 1873; Fordoun, Kincardineshire, Scotland
- Died: 6 August 1941 (aged 68)
- Citizenship: British
- Education: University of Aberdeen (MA, BSc) University of Göttingen (PhD)
- Scientific career
- Fields: Physical chemistry
- Workplaces: Imperial College London
- Thesis: Dielectric properties of liquid mixtures, particularly dilute solutions (1897)
- Doctoral advisor: Walther Nernst

James Charles Philip OBE FRS (12 February 1873 - 6 August 1941) was a British physical chemist.

== Early life and education ==
Philip was born in Fordoun, Kincardineshire on 12 February 1873 to Reverend John Philip and Janet Philip, née Morison Littlejohn, the youngest of five sons. From the ages of 13 to 16 he studied at Aberdeen Grammar School, and then enrolled at the University of Aberdeen, attaining a first-class MA in mathematics and natural philosophy by the age of 20. He then switched to chemistry, attaining a BSc in 1895 under the tutelage of Francis Japp. Following this, Philip traveled to Germany on a Murray Scholarship and studied under Walther Nernst in Göttingen, and was awarded a PhD in 1897 for a thesis entitled "Dielectric properties of liquid mixtures, particularly dilute solutions".

== Career ==
On attaining his doctorate, Philip spent a year as a research student at the Central Technical College under H.E. Armstrong. He then transferred to Cambridge to work under C.T. Heycock and F.H. Neville, completing the majority of the practical work for their study of gold-aluminium alloys. In 1899, he was invited by Sir William Tilden to deliver lectures at the Royal College of Science, and he accepted a job as demonstrator and lecturer in chemistry there in January 1900.

Philip was made an assistant professor in 1909 by incoming chair of chemistry Sir Edward Thorpe, and upon H.B. Baker's appointment to the chair in 1913, Philip was given the newly created chair of physical chemistry. In this role he continued his research into the effect of electrolytes on the aqueous solubility of gases. He also worked with Arthur Bramley to investigate the effects of non-electrolytes, particularly sugars, proving that they could affect each other's solubility without dissociation.

Philip was appointed Honorary Secretary of the Chemical Society in 1913, a role he held until 1924. He helped to establish the Bureau of Chemical Abstracts, designed to foster collaboration between the publishing arms of the Chemical Society and the Society of Chemical Industry, becoming its first chairman from 1923 until 1932, and was chairman of the Publication Committee of the Chemical Society from 1931 to 1934.

In 1914, Philip became secretary to a committee of the Royal Society investigating medicine shortages brought about by the First World War. He also experimented with means of counteracting gas weapons, and discovered the absorptive properties of activated charcoal. For his wartime service, Philip received an OBE in 1918.

Philip became a Fellow of the Royal Society in 1921 and was a member of its council from 1928 to 1930.

On Baker's retirement in 1932, Philip succeeded him as director of the laboratories of inorganic and physical chemistry at what was by now Imperial College London. He retired in 1938, and was succeeded by Vincent Briscoe, but soon returned as Deputy Rector of the college, under Rector Sir Henry Tizard. He had also been elected Dean of the Faculty of Science in 1934, and Deputy Vice-Chancellor in 1937. Philip also sat on the University of London Senate from 1932 to 1938.

In 1939, with the outbreak of the Second World War, the Philip became chairman of the Chemistry and Industrial Chemistry Committees of the Central Register in the Ministry of Labour and the University of London Joint Recruiting Board, coordinating the National Service assignments of chemistry students. He was also elected President of the Society of Chemical Industry the same year, and became President of the Chemical Society in 1941, giving him the rare distinction of being president of both societies simultaneously. He also served as acting rector from the outbreak of the war in 1939 until his death in 1941.

In July 1941, shortly before his death, Philip received an honorary LLD from the University of Aberdeen.

== Personal life ==
Philip was known as an able tennis player and for his fine singing voice. He married Jane Henderson in 1900, and had a son, W. Elmslie Philip who became Secretary of Education for Devon, and a daughter. He was an elder of St John's Presbyterian Church, Kensington, for 36 years.
