= Arthur Bramley (chemist) =

British chemist and metallurgist

Arthur Bramley (1878 - 19 July 1935) was a British chemist and metallurgist.

== Early life and education ==
Bramley was born in Elland, Yorkshire, in 1878, and after leaving school was apprenticed as a hosier. He later pursued a technical education at Halifax Technical College, before joining their staff in 1904. He was awarded a national scholarship to the Royal College of Science in 1906, graduating with a BSc in 1909.

== Career ==
After graduating from the Royal Technical College, Bramley worked as J.C. Philip's research assistant, assisting him with his work on the properties of solutions. After a DSc on the physical properties of binary liquid mixtures, he entered the private sector at the British Dyestuffs Corporation in Huddersfield.

Bramley left the BDC in 1918, becoming head of the Department of Pure and Applied Science at Loughborough College. Here, he worked on the diffusion of non-metals into iron and steel, work for which he was awarded the Carnegie Gold Medal for his research work in 1929 under the scheme of the Andrew Carnegie Research Scholarships of the Iron and Steel Institute.

Bramley was also elected to membership of the Institute of Metals on 30 December 1921.

Bramley died on 19 July 1935, aged 56.
