= Henry Vincent Aird Briscoe =

British inorganic chemist

Vincent Briscoe
- Born: 24 September 1888; London, England
- Died: 24 September 1961 (aged 73); London, England
- Scientific career
- Fields: Inorganic chemistry
- Workplaces: Imperial College London; Armstrong College, Newcastle; Sir John Cass Technical Institute
- Doctoral students: Geoffrey Wilkinson

Henry Vincent Aird Briscoe (24 September 1888 - 24 September 1961), also known as Vincent Briscoe, was an inorganic chemist who spent most of his career at Imperial College London.

== Early life and education ==
Briscoe was born in London, and studied at City of London School, later reading chemistry at the Royal College of Science, shortly before its incorporation into Imperial College, from 1906 to 1909.

== Career ==
Briscoe worked as a lecturer at Imperial during the First World War, before going on to be appointed a professor at the Sir John Cass Technical Institute. In 1921, he moved to Armstrong College, Newcastle (now part of Durham University), where he became head of department in 1925, before returning to Imperial in 1932 as Chair of Inorganic Chemistry, retiring in 1954.

At Imperial, Briscoe researched, among other topics, heavy water, and developed an accurate method for finding the quantity of deuterium in smaller samples. He became the director of the inorganic and physical chemistry laboratories in 1938, succeeding J.C. Philip, and Head of Department in 1949. At Imperial, his PhD students included Geoffrey Wilkinson.

== Personal life ==
Briscoe married Rebecca K. Johnstone and had a son, William A. Briscoe, who became Associate Professor of Medicine at Columbia University, and a daughter, Dr Jean Mary Hinde. Briscoe died in London on 24 September 1961, at the age of 73. It was his 73rd birthday.

== Recognition ==
Briscoe was a fellow of the Royal Institute of Chemistry and the Institute of Fuel, and was elected a fellow of Imperial College London in 1958. Imperial has also names both an annual lecture at The Institute for Security Science and Technology and the undergraduate physical chemistry laboratory after Briscoe.
