= Tiberius Cavallo =

Italian physicist and natural philosopher (1749–1809)

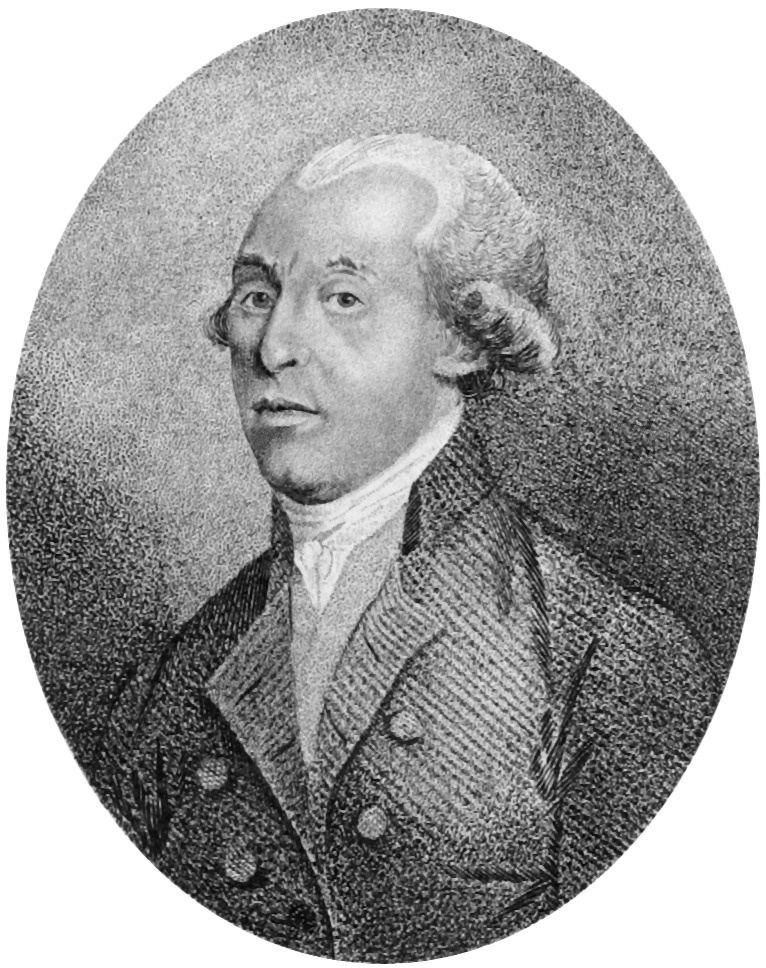
- Born: 30 March 1749; Naples
- Died: 21 December 1809 (aged 60); London

Tiberius Cavallo (also Tiberio) (30 March 1749, Naples, Kingdom of Naples – 21 December 1809, London, England) was an Italian physicist and natural philosopher. His interests included electricity, the development of scientific instruments, the nature of "airs", and ballooning. He became both a Member of the Royal Academy of Sciences in Naples, and a Fellow of the Royal Society of London in 1779. Between 1780 and 1792, he presented the Royal Society's Bakerian Lecture thirteen times in succession.

== Life ==
Tiberius Cavallo was born on 30 March 1749 at Naples, Italy where his father was a physician. In 1771 he moved to England.

Cavallo made several ingenious improvements in scientific instruments. He is often cited as the inventor of Cavallo's multiplier. He also developed a "pocket electrometer" that he used to amplify small electric charges to make them observable and measurable with an electroscope. Parts of the instrument were protected from drafts by a glass enclosure.

He also worked on refrigeration. Following the work of William Cullen in 1750 and Joseph Black in 1764, Cavallo was the first to carry out systematic experiments on refrigeration using the evaporation of volatile liquids, in 1781.

He was interested in the physical properties of "airs" or gases, and carried out experiments on "inflammable air" (hydrogen gas). In his Treatise on the Nature and Properties of Air (1781) he made "a judicious examination of contemporary work", discussing both the phlogiston theory of Joseph Priestley and the contrasting views of Antoine Lavoisier. In June 1782, a paper of Cavallo's was read at the Royal Society, describing the first attempt to lift a hydrogen-filled balloon into the air. His History and Practice of Aerostation (1785) was considered "one of the earliest and best works on aerostation published in eighteenth century England". In it, Cavallo discusses both recent experiments in ballooning, and its underlying principles. Cavallo targeted a more general audience in this work, avoiding technical jargon and mathematical proofs, and was an effective science communicator to both his peers and the general public. His work influenced pioneer balloonists Jacques Charles, the Robert brothers, and Jean-Pierre Blanchard.

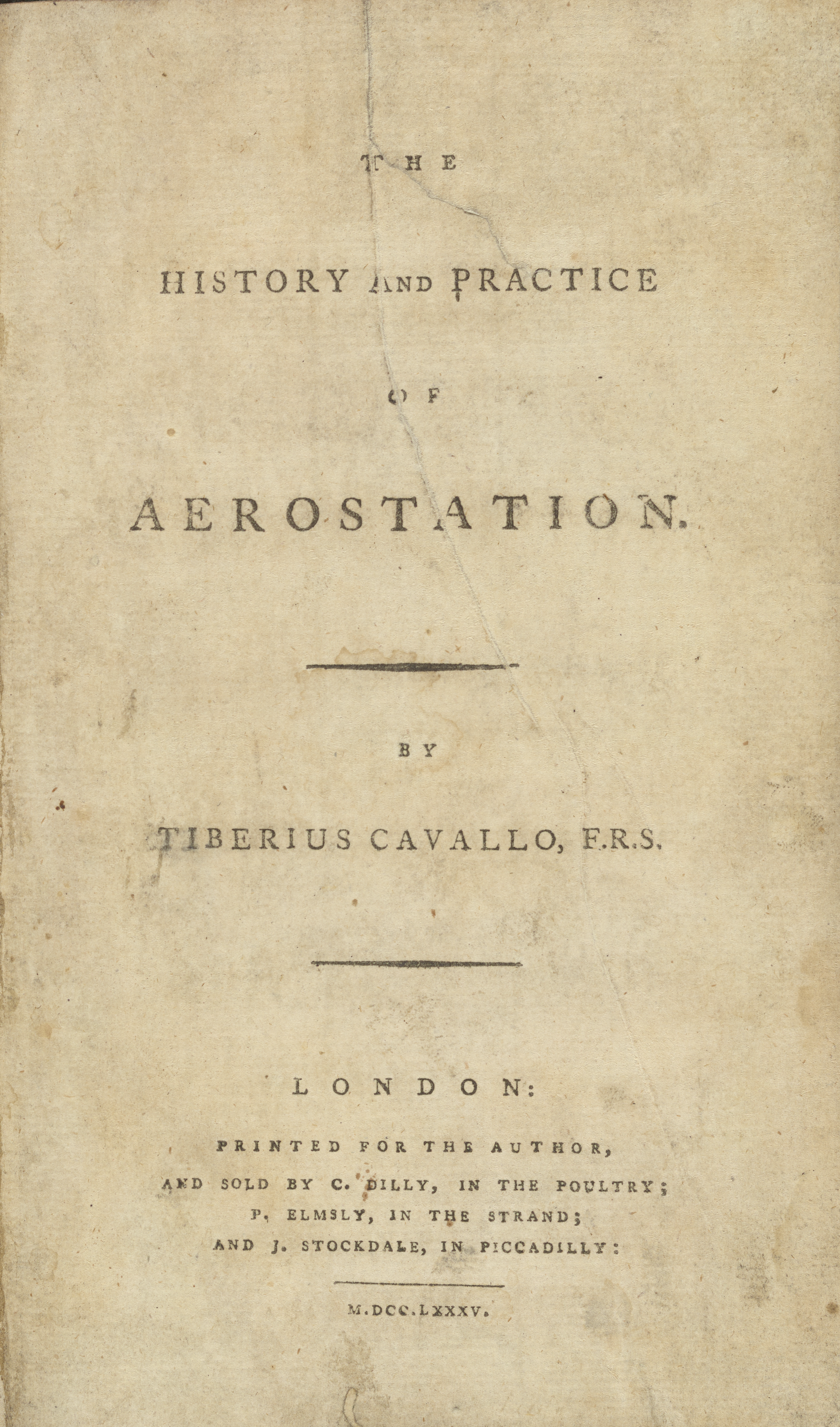
History and Practice of Aerostation, Tiberius Cavallo, 1785

Plate I, Illustrating the chemical apparatus and balloons used for hydrogen generation

Plate II, Illustrating the chemical apparatus and balloons used for hydrogen generation

Cavallo also published on musical temperament in his treatise Of the Temperament of Those Musical Instruments, in Which the Tones, Keys, or Frets, are Fixed, as in the Harpsichord, Organ, Guitar, &c.

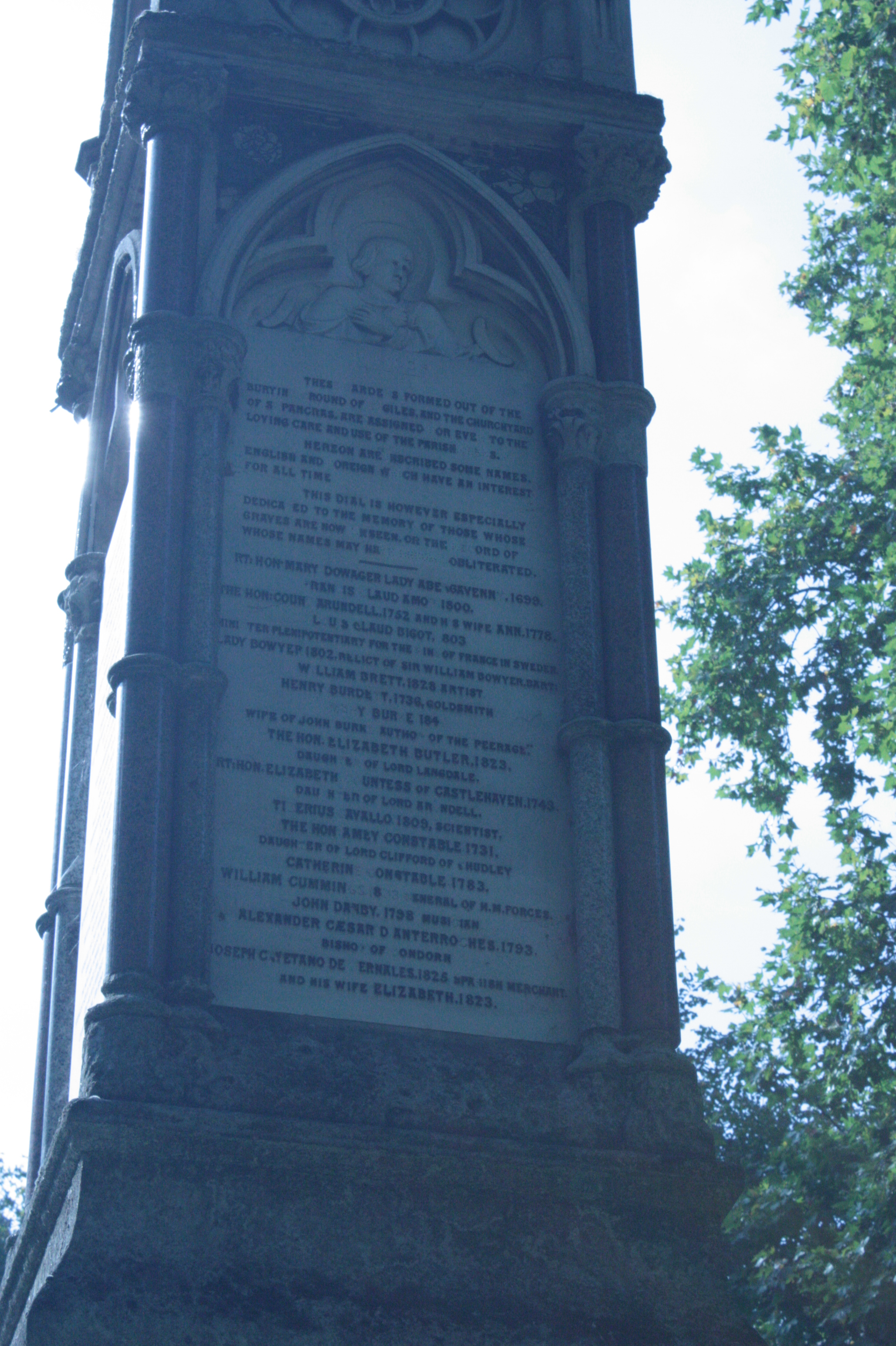
The Burdett Coutts memorial, Old St Pancras. Cavallo's name is towards the bottom, but the letters B and C are missing.

He died in London on 21 December 1809. He was buried in Old St Pancras Churchyard, reportedly in a vault near that of Pasquale Paoli. The grave is lost but he is listed on the Burdett Coutts memorial of 1879 to the many important persons buried therein.

== Works ==
He published numerous works on different branches of physics, including:

- Complete treatise of electricity in theory and practice (in Italian). Firenze: Gaetano Cambiagi. 1779.
- Theory and Practice of Medical Electricity (1780)
- Treatise on the nature and properties of air and other permanently elastic fluids. London. 1781.
- Complete treatise on electricity in theory and practice [fre] (in French). Paris: Guillot. 1785.
- History and Practice of Aerostation (1785)
- Treatise on magnetism. London: Charles Dilly. 1787.
- Medical Properties of Factitious Air (1798)
- Elements of Natural and Experimental Philosophy (1803)

For Rees's Cyclopædia he contributed articles on Electricity, Machinery and Mechanics, but the topics are not known.

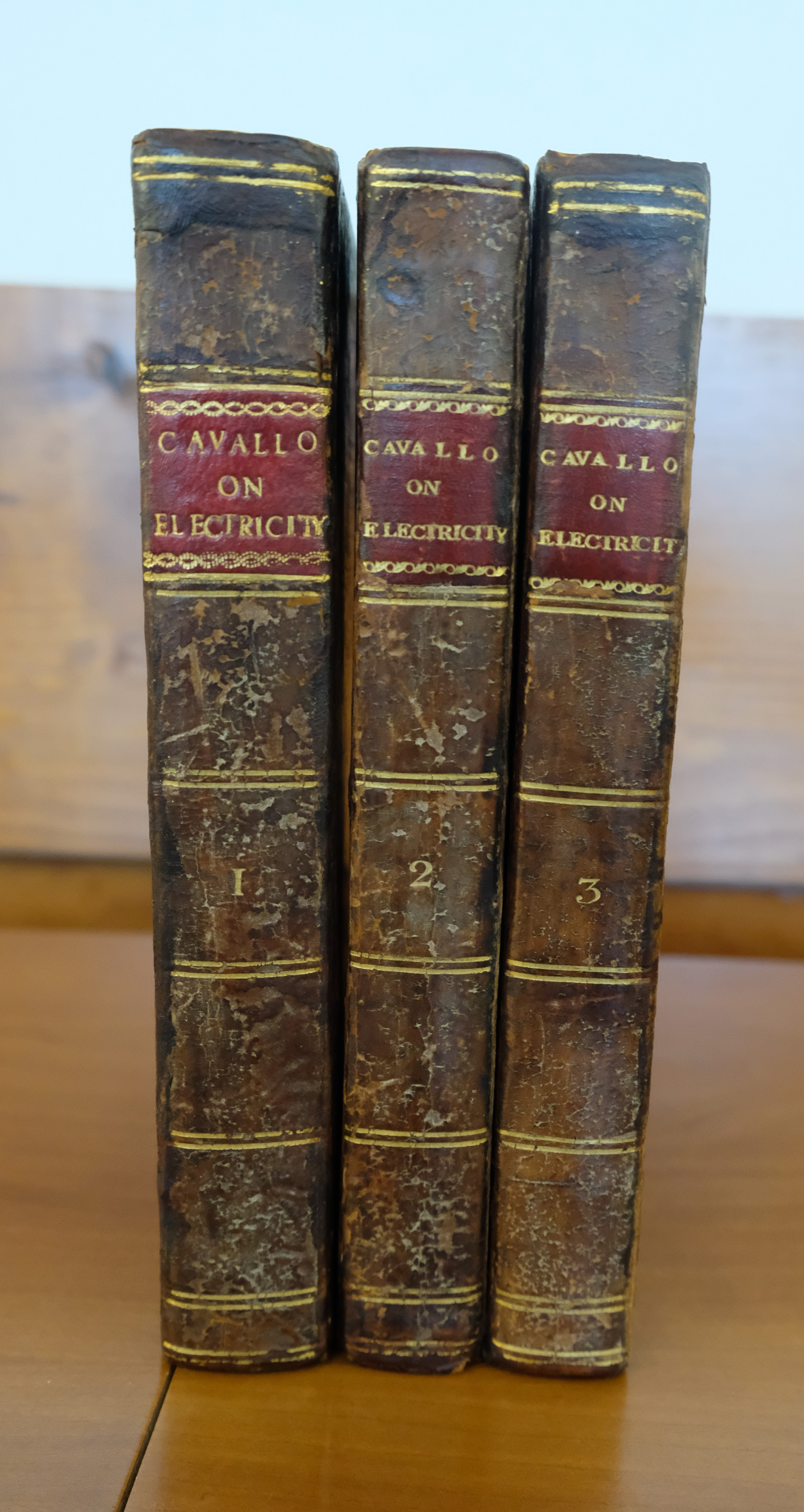
1795 copies of volumes 1-3 of "A Complete Treatise on Electricity in Theory and Practice with Original Experiments"

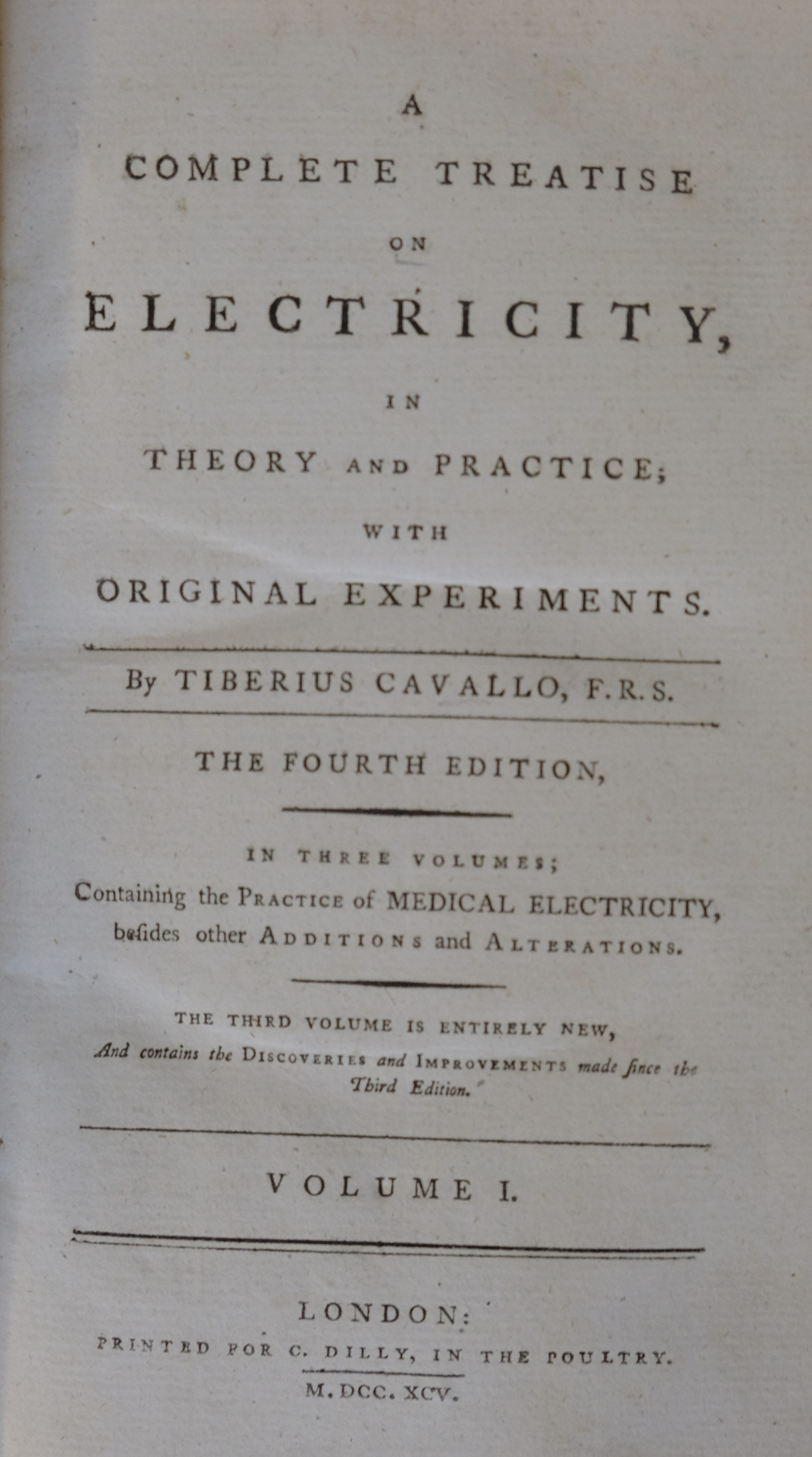
Title page of a 1795 copy of "A Complete Treatise on Electricity in Theory and Practice with Original Experiments," volume 1
