= Copley Medal =

Award given by the Royal Society of London

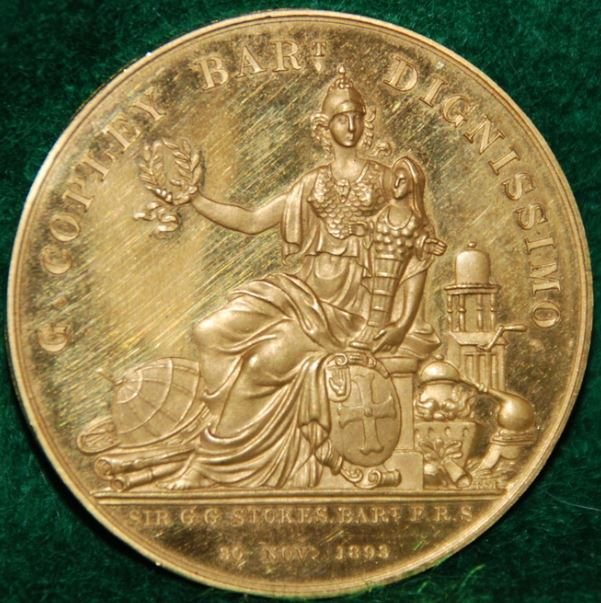
- The Copley Medal awarded to George Stokes in 1893 (obverse)
- Awarded for: Outstanding research in any branch of science
- Sponsored by: Royal Society
- Country: United Kingdom
- First award: 1731; 295 years ago
- Website: Copley Medal
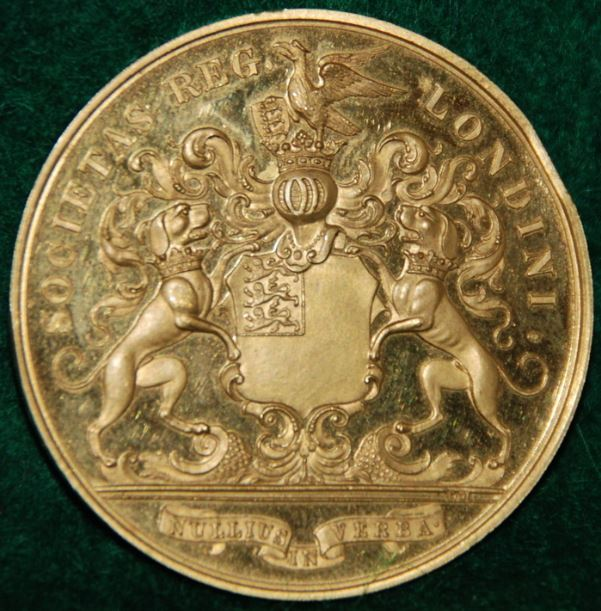
- Reverse

Precedence
- Next (lower): Bakerian Medal (physical sciences); Croonian Medal (biological sciences)

The Copley Medal is the most prestigious award of the Royal Society of the United Kingdom, conferred "for sustained, outstanding achievements in any field of science". The award alternates between the physical sciences or mathematics and the biological sciences. It is widely considered the highest British and Commonwealth award for scientific merit and achievement, and has regularly been included among the most distinguished international scientific awards. Due to its historic significance, the Copley Medal has often been viewed as a predecessor to the Nobel Prize.

Given annually, the medal is the oldest Royal Society medal awarded and the oldest surviving scientific award in the world, having first been given in 1731 to Stephen Gray, for "his new Electrical Experiments: – as an encouragement to him for the readiness he has always shown in obliging the Society with his discoveries and improvements in this part of Natural Knowledge". The medal is made of silver-gilt and awarded with a £25,000 prize.

It is awarded to "senior scientists" irrespective of nationality, and nominations are considered over three nomination cycles. Since 2022, scientific teams or research groups are collectively eligible to receive the medal; that year, the research team which developed the Oxford–AstraZeneca COVID-19 vaccine became the first collective recipient. John Theophilus Desaguliers has won the medal the most often, winning three times, in 1734, 1736 and 1741. In 1976, Dorothy Hodgkin became the first female recipient; Jocelyn Bell Burnell, in 2021, became the second.

== History ==
In 1709, Sir Godfrey Copley, the MP for Thirsk, bequeathed Abraham Hill and Hans Sloane £100 (roughly equivalent to £15,455 in 2025) to be held in trust for the Royal Society "for improving natural knowledge to be laid out in experiments or otherwise for the benefit thereof as they shall direct and appoint". After the legacy had been received the following year, the interest of £5 was duly used to provide recurring grants for experimental work to researchers associated with the Royal Society, provided they registered their research within a stipulated period and demonstrated their experiments at an annual meeting. In 1726, following a proposal by Sloane, the grants were extended to "strangers" unaffiliated with the Society to encourage "new and useful experiments", though it was only five years later that Stephen Gray became the first such recipient. Prior to Gray, John Theophilus Desaguliers was apparently the only recipient of the grant, but had not always conducted the required annual demonstration.

In November 1736, Martin Folkes, then vice-president of the Society, suggested the Copley grant be converted to "a medal or other honorary prize to be bestowed on the person whose experiment should be best approved...a laudable emulation might be excited among men of genius to try their invention, who in all probability may never be moved for the sake of lucre". On 7 December 1736, the Council of the Royal Society agreed to Folkes' proposal, passing a resolution that the annual Copley grant of five pounds (roughly equivalent to £933 in 2025) be converted to a gold medal "of the same Value, with the Arms of the Society impress’d on it", to be gifted "for the best Experiment produced within the Year, and bestowed in such a manner as to avoid any Envy or Disgust in Rivalship". John Belchier was the first to receive the new award in 1737; due to delays in approving a medal design, however, the medal, designed and struck by John Sigismund Tanner of the Royal Mint, was only presented to Belchier in 1742. Gray and Desaguliers received their medals retrospectively.

Into the early 19th century, medal recipients were selected by the President of the Royal Society, though not always on the basis of publications and experimental demonstrations; political and social connections were also key considerations, along with service in the general interests of the Society. During the long presidency of Joseph Banks, the medal was frequently awarded to recipients whose researches were of a practical or technical nature, involving improvements to scientific equipment or instrument design. In 1831, new regulations adopted by the Royal Society Council made the medal an annual award, dropped the requirement for conducting the qualifying research within a certain period and officially opened it to scientists from any nation; although the medal had previously been awarded to foreign scientists including Alessandro Volta, the majority of recipients had been British subjects. A second donation of £1666 13s. 4d. (roughly equivalent to £175,212 in 2025) was made by Sir Joseph William Copley in 1881, and the interest from that amount is used to pay for the medal.

== Prestige of the medal ==
By the 1840s, the Copley Medal had achieved international prestige; in 1850, George Airy noted the distinction of the medal was that it was "offered to the competition of the world". The Copley medal has been characterised as a predecessor to the Nobel Prize. Since its inception, it has been awarded to many distinguished scientists, including 62 winners of the Nobel Prize: 19 in Physics, 22 in Physiology or Medicine and 21 in Chemistry.

== Medal recipients ==
Year	Image	Name	Rationale	Notes
1731		Stephen Gray	"For his new Electrical Experiments: – as an encouragement to him for the readiness he has always shown in obliging the Society with his discoveries and improvements in this part of Natural Knowledge"	
1732		Stephen Gray	"For the Experiments he made for the year 1732"	
1733		No Award	—	—
1734		John Theophilus Desaguliers	"In consideration of his several Experiments performed before the Society"	
1735		No Award	—	—
1736		John Theophilus Desaguliers	"For his experiments made during the year"	
1737		John Belchier	"For his Experiment to show the property of a Diet of Madder Root in dyeing the Bones of living animals of a red colour"	
1738		James Valoue	"For his invention of an Engine for driving the Piles to make a Foundation for the Bridge to be erected at Westminster, the Model whereof had been shown to the Society"	—
1739		Stephen Hales	"For his Experiments towards the Discovery of Medicines for dissolving the Stone; and Preservatives for keeping Meat in long voyages at Sea"	
1740		Alexander Stuart	"For his Lectures on Muscular Motion. As a further addition for his services to the Society in the care and pains he has taken therein"	
1741		John Theophilus Desaguliers	"For his Experiments towards the discovery of the properties of Electricity. As an addition to his allowance (as Curator) for the present year."	
1742		Christopher Middleton	"For the communication of his Observations in the attempt of discovering a North-West passage to the East Indies through Hudsons Bay"	
1743		Abraham Trembley	"For his Experiments on the Polypus"	—
1744		Henry Baker	"For his curious Experiments relating to the Crystallization or Configuration of the minute particles of Saline Bodies dissolved in a menstruum"	
1745		William Watson	"On account of the surprising discoveries in the phenomena of Electricity, exhibited in his late Experiments"	
1746		Benjamin Robins	"On account of his curious Experiments for showing the resistance of the Air, and his rules for establishing his doctrine thereon for the motion of Projectiles"	
1747		Gowin Knight	"On account of several very curious Experiments exhibited by him, both with Natural and Artificial Magnets"	
1748		James Bradley	"On account of his very curious and wonderful discoveries in the apparent motion of the Fixed Stars, and the causes of such apparent motion"	
1749		John Harrison	"On account of those very curious Instruments, invented and made by him, for the exact mensuration of Time"	
1750		George Edwards	"On account of a very curious Book lately published by him, and intiyled, A Natural History of Birds, &c. – containing the Figures elegantly drawn, and illuminated in their proper colours, of 209 different Birds, and about 20 very rare Quadrupeds, Serpents, Fishes, and Insects."	
1751		John Canton	"On account of his communicating to the Society, and exhibiting before them, his curious method of making Artificial Magnets without the use of Natural ones"	
1752		Sir John Pringle, 1st Baronet	"On account of his very curious and useful Experiments and Observations on Septic and Anti-septic Substances, communicated to the Society"	
1753		Benjamin Franklin	"On account of his curious Experiments and Observations on Electricity"	
1754		William Lewis	"For the many Experiments made by him on Platina, which tend to the discovery of the sophistication of gold: – which he would have entirely completed, but was obliged to put a stop to his further enquiries for want of materials"	
1755		John Huxham	"For his many useful Experiments on Antimony, of which an account had been read to the Society"	
1756		No Award	—	—
1757		Lord Charles Cavendish	"On account of his very curious and useful invention of making Thermometers, showing respectively the greatest degrees of heat and cold which have happened at any time during the absence of the observer"	
1758		John Dollond	"On account of his curious Experiments and Discoveries concerning the different refrangibility of the Rays of Light, communicated to the Society"	
1759		John Smeaton	"On account of his curious Experiments concerning Water-wheels and Wind-mill Sails, communicated to the Society. For his experimental enquiry concerning the powers of water and wind in the moving of Mills"	
1760		Benjamin Wilson	"For his many curious Experiments in Electricity, communicated to the Society within the year"	
1761		No Award	—	—
1762		No Award	—	—
1763		No Award	—	—
1764		John Canton	"For his very ingenious and elegant Experiments in the Air Pump and Condensing Engine, to prove the Compressibility of Water, and some other Fluids"	
1765		No Award	—	—
1766		William Brownrigg, Edward Delaval and Henry Cavendish	"For an experimental enquiry into the Mineral Elastic Spirit, or Air, contained in Spa-Water; as well as into the Mephitic qualities of this Spirit. (Brownrigg)" "For his Experiments and Observations on the agreement between the specific gravities of the several Metals, and their colours when united to glass, as well as those of their other preparations. (Delaval)" "For his Paper communicated this present year, containing his Experiments relating to Fixed Air. (Cavendish)"	
1767		John Ellis	"For his Papers of the year 1767, On the animal nature of the Genus of Zoophytes called Corallina, and the Actinia Sociata, or Clustered Animal Flower, lately found on the sea coasts of the new-ceded Islands"	
1768		Peter Woulfe	"For his Experiments on the Distillation of Acids, Volatile Alkalies, and other substances"	
1769		William Hewson	"For his Two Papers, entitled, An Account of the Lymphatic System in Amphibious Animals, – and An Account of the Lymphatic System in Fish"	—
1770		William Hamilton	"For his Paper, entitled, An Account of a Journey to Mount Etna"	
1771		Matthew Raper	"For his paper entitled, An Enquiry into the value of ancient Greek and Roman Money"	—
1772		Joseph Priestley	"On account of the many curious and useful Experiments contained in his observations on different kinds of Air"	
1773		John Walsh	"For his Paper on the Torpedo"	
1774		No Award	—	—
1775		Nevil Maskelyne	"In consideration of his curious and laborious Observations on the Attraction of Mountains, made in Scotland, – on Schehallien"	
1776		James Cook	"For his Paper, giving an account of the method he had taken to preserve the health of the crew of H.M. Ship the Resolution, during her late voyage round the world. Whose communication to the Society was of such importance to the public"	
1777		John Mudge	"On account of his valuable Paper containing directions for making the best Composition for the metals of Reflecting Telescopes; together with a description of the process for grinding, polishing, and giving the best speculum the true parabolic form"	—
1778		Charles Hutton	"For his paper, entitled, The force of Fired Gunpowder, and the initial velocity of Cannon Balls, determined by Experiments"	
1779		No Award	—	—
1780		Samuel Vince	"For his paper, entitled, An investigation of the Principles of Progressive and Rotatory Motion, printed in the Philosophical Transactions"	
1781		William Herschel	"For the Communication of his Discovery of a new and singular Star; a discovery which does him particular honour, as, in all probability, this star has been for many years, perhaps ages, within the bounds of astronomic vision, and yet till now, eluded the most diligent researches of other observers"	
1782		Richard Kirwan	"As a reward for the merit of his labours in the science of Chemistry. For his chemical analyses of Salts"	
1783		John Goodricke and Thomas Hutchins	"For his discovery of the Period of the Variation of Light in the Star Algol. (Goodricke)" "For his Experiments to ascertain the point of Mercurial Congelation. (Hutchins)"	
1784		Edward Waring	"For his Mathematical Communications to the Society. For his Paper On the Summation of Series, whose general term is a determinate function of z the distance from the first term of the series"	
1785		William Roy	"For his Measurement of a Base on Hounslow Heath"	
1786		No Award	—	—
1787		John Hunter	"For his three Papers, – On the Ovaria, On the identity of the dog, wolf, and jackall species, and On the anatomy of Whales, printed in the Philosophical Transactions for 1787"	
1788		Charles Blagden	"For his two Papers on Congelation, printed in the last (78th) volume of the Philosophical transactions"	
1789		William Morgan	"For his two Papers on the values of Reversions and Survivorships, printed in the two last volumes of the Philosophical Transactions"	
1790		No Award	—	—
1791		James Rennell and Jean-André Deluc	"For his Paper on the Rate of Travelling as performed by Camels, printed in the last (81st) volume of the Philosophical Transactions. (Rennell)" "For his Improvements in Hygrometry. (De Luc)"	
1792		Benjamin Thompson	"For his various Papers on the Properties and Communication of Heat"	
1793		No Award	—	—
1794		Alessandro Volta	"For his several Communications explanatory of certain Experiments published by Professor Galvani"	
1795		Jesse Ramsden	"For his various inventions and improvements in the construction of the Instruments for the Trigonometrical measurements carried on by the late Major General Roy, and by Lieut. Col. Williams and his associates"	
1796		George Atwood	"For his Paper on the construction and analysis of geometrical propositions determining the positions assumed by homogeneal bodies which float freely, and at rest; and also determining the Stability of Ships and other floating bodies"	
1797		No Award	—	—
1798		George Shuckburgh-Evelyn and Charles Hatchett	"For his various Communications printed in the Philosophical Transactions. (Evelyn)" "For his Chemical Communications printed in the Philosophical Transactions. (Hatchett)"	
1799		John Hellins	"For his improved Solution of a problem in Physical Astronomy, &c. printed in the Philosophical Transactions for the year 1798; and his other Mathematical Papers"	
1800		Edward Charles Howard	"For his Paper on a New Fulminating Mercury"	
1801		Astley Cooper	"For his Papers – on the effects which take place from the destruction of the Membrana Tympani of the Ear; with an account of an operation for the removal of a particular species of Deafness"	
1802		William Hyde Wollaston	"For his various Papers printed in the Philosophical Transactions"	
1803		Richard Chenevix	"For his various Chemical Papers printed in the Philosophical Transactions"	
1804		Smithson Tennant	"For his various Chemical Discoveries communicated to the Society, and printed in several volumes of the Philosophical Transactions"	
1805		Humphry Davy	"For his various Communications published in the Philosophical Transactions"	
1806		Thomas Andrew Knight	"For his various Papers on Vegetation, printed in the Philosophical Transactions"	
1807		Everard Home	"For his various Papers on Anatomy and Physiology, printed in the Philosophical Transactions"	—
1808		William Henry	"For his various papers communicated to the society, and printed in the Philosophical Transactions"	—
1809		Edward Troughton	"For the Account of his Method of dividing Astronomical Instruments, printed in the last volume of the Philosophical Transactions"	
1810		No Award	—	—
1811		Benjamin Collins Brodie	"For his Papers printed in the Philosophical Transactions. On the influence of the Brain on the action of the Heart, and the generation of Animal Heat; and on the different modes in which death is brought on by certain Vegetable Poisons"	
1812		No Award	—	—
1813		William Thomas Brande	"For his Communications concerning the Alcohol contained in Fermented Liquors and other Papers, printed in the Philosophical Transactions"	—
1814		James Ivory	"For his various Mathematical Contributions printed in the Philosophical Transactions"	
1815		David Brewster	"For his Paper on the Polarization of Light by Reflection from Transparent Bodies"	
1816		No Award	—	—
1817		Henry Kater	"For his Experiments on the Pendulum"	
1818		Robert Seppings	"For his Papers on the construction of Ships of War, printed in the Philosophical Transactions"	—
1819		No Award	—	—
1820		Hans Christian Ørsted	"For his Electro-magnetic Discoveries"	
1821		Edward Sabine and John Herschel	"For his various Communications to the Royal Society relating to his researches made in the late Expedition to the Arctic Regions. (Sabine)" "For his Papers printed in the Philosophical Transactions. (Herschel)"	
1822		William Buckland	"For his Paper on the Fossil Teeth and Bones discovered in a Cave at Kirkdale"	
1823		John Pond	"For his various Communications to the Royal Society"	—
1824		John Brinkley	"For his various Communications to the Royal Society"	
1825		François Arago and Peter Barlow	"For the Discovery of the Magnetic Properties of substances not containing Iron. For the Discovery of the power of various bodies, principally metallic, to receive magnetic impressions, in the same, though in a more evanescent manner than malleable Iron, and in an infinitely less intense degree. (Arago)" "For his various Communications on the subject of Magnetism. (Barlow)"	
1826		James South	"For his observations of Double Stars, and his Paper on the Discordances between the Suns observed and computed Right Ascensions, published in the Transactions of the Society. For his Paper of Observations of the Apparent Distances and Positions of Four Hundred and Fifty-eight Double and Triple Stars, published in the present volume (1826, Part 1.) of the Transactions"	
1827		William Prout and Henry Foster	"For his Paper entitled, On the ultimate Composition of simple alimentary substances, with some preliminary remarks on the analysis of organized bodies in general. (Prout)" "For his magnetic and other observations made during the Arctic expedition to Port Bowen. (Foster)"	
1828		No Award	—	—
1829		No Award	—	—
1830		No Award	—	—
1831		George Biddell Airy	"For his Papers, On the principle of the construction of the Achromatic Eye-pieces of Telescopes, – On the Spherical Aberration of the Eye-pieces of Telescopes, and for other Papers on Optical Subjects in the Transactions of the Cambridge Philosophical Society"	
1832		Michael Faraday and Siméon Denis Poisson	"For his discovery of Magneto-Electricity as detailed in his Experimental Researches in Electricity, published in the Philosophical Transactions for the present year. (Faraday)" "For his work entitled, Nouvelle Theorie de lAction Capillaire. (Poisson)"	
1833		No Award	—	—
1834		Giovanni Antonio Amedeo Plana	"For his work entitled, Theorie du Mouvement de la Lune"	
1835		William Snow Harris	"For his experimental investigations of the force of electricity of high intensity contained in the Philosophical Transactions of 1834"	
1836		Jöns Jacob Berzelius and Francis Kiernan	"For his systematic application of the doctrine of definite proportions to the analysis of mineral bodies, as contained in his Nouveau Systeme de Mineralogie, and in other of his works. (Berzelius)" "For his discoveries relating to the structure of the liver, as detailed in his paper communicated to the Royal Society, and published in the Philosophical Transactions for 1833. (Kiernan)"	—
1837		Antoine César Becquerel and John Frederic Daniell	"For his various memoirs on the subject of electricity, published in the Memoires deacademie Royale des Sciences de lInstitut de France, and particularly for those on the production of crystals of metallic sulphurets and of sulphur, by the long-continued action of electricity of very low tension, and published in the tenth volume of those Memoires. (Becquerel)" "For his two papers on voltaic combinations published in the Philosophical Transactions for 1836. (Daniell)"	
1838		Carl Friedrich Gauss and Michael Faraday	"For his inventions and mathematical researches in magnetism. (Gauss)" "For his researches in specific electrical induction. (Faraday)"	
1839		Robert Brown	"For his discoveries during a series of years, on the subject of vegetable impregnation"	
1840		Justus von Liebig and Jacques Charles François Sturm	"For his discoveries in organic chemistry, and particularly for his development of the composition and theory of organic radicals. (Liebig)" "For his "Memoire sur la Resolution des Equations Numeriques," published in the Memoires des Savans Etrangers for 1835. (Sturm)"	
1841		Georg Ohm	"For his researches into the laws of electric currents contained in various memoirs published in Schweiggers Journal, Poggendorffs Annalen and in a separate work entitled Die galvanische Kette mathematisch bearbeitet"	
1842		James MacCullagh	"For his researches connected with the wave theory of light, contained in the Transactions of the Royal Irish Academy"	
1843		Jean-Baptiste Dumas	"For his late valuable researches in organic chemistry, particularly those contained in a series of memoirs on chemical types and the doctrine of substitution, and also for his elaborate investigations of the atomic weights of carbon, oxygen, hydrogen, nitrogen and other elements"	—
1844		Carlo Matteucci	"For his various researches in animal electricity"	
1845		Theodor Schwann	"For his physiological researches on the development of animal & vegetable textures, published in his work entitled Mikroskopische Untersuchungen uber die Uebereinstimmung in der Struktur u. dem Wachsthun der Thiese u. Pflanzen"	—
1846		Urbain Le Verrier	"For his investigations relative to the disturbances of Uranus by which he proved the existence and predicted the place of the new Planet; the Council considering such prediction confirmed as it was by the immediate discovery of the Planet to be one of the proudest triumphs of modern analysis applied to the Newtonian Theory of Gravitation"	
1847		John Herschel	"For his work entitled Results of Astronomical Observations made during the years 1834, 1835, 1836, 1837 and 1838, at the Cape of Good Hope; being a completion of a telescopic survey of the whole surface of the visible heavens, commenced in 1825"	
1848		John Couch Adams	"For his investigations relative to the disturbances of Uranus, and for his application of the inverse problem of perturbations thereto"	
1849		Roderick Murchison	"For the eminent services he has rendered to geological science during many years of active observation in several parts of Europe; and especially for the establishment of that classification of the older Palaeozoic deposits designated the Silurian System, as set forth in the two works entitled The Silurian System founded on Geological Researches in England, and The Geology of Russia in Europe and the Ural Mountains"	—
1850		Peter Andreas Hansen	"For his researches in physical astronomy"	
1851		Richard Owen	"On account of his important discoveries in comparative anatomy & palaeontology, contained in the Philosophical Transactions and numerous other works"	
1852		Alexander von Humboldt	"For his eminent services in terrestrial physics, during a series of years"	
1853		Heinrich Wilhelm Dove	"For his work on the distribution of heat over the surface of the Earth"	—
1854		Johannes Peter Müller	"For his important contributions to different branches of physiology and comparative anatomy, and particularly for his researches on the embryology of the Echinodermata, contained in a series of memoirs published in the Transactions of the Royal Academy of Sciences of Berlin"	
1855		Léon Foucault	"For his various researches in experimental physics"	
1856		Henri Milne-Edwards	"For his researches in comparative anatomy and zoology"	—
1857		Michel Eugène Chevreul	"For his researches in organic chemistry, particularly on the composition of the fats, and for his researches on the contrast of coulours"	
1858		Charles Lyell	"For his various researches and writings by which he has contributed to the advance of geology"	
1859		Wilhelm Eduard Weber	"For the investigations contained in his Maasbestimmungen and other researches in electricity, magnetism, acoustics"	
1860		Robert Bunsen	"For his researches on cacodyls, gaseous analysis, the volcanic phenomena of Iceland; and other researches"	
1861		Louis Agassiz	"For his eminent researches in palaeontology and other branches of science, and particularly for his great works the Poissons Fossiles, and his Poissons du Vieux Gres Rouge dEcosse"	
1862		Thomas Graham	"For three memoirs of the diffusion of liquids, published in the Philosophical Transactions for 1850 and 1851; for a memoir on osmotic force in the Philosophical Transactions for 1854; and particularly for a paper on liquid diffusion applied to analysis, including a distinction of compounds into colloids & crystalloids published in the Philosophical Transactions for 1861"	
1863		Adam Sedgwick	"For his original observations and discoveries in the geology of the Palaeozoic Series of rocks, and more especially for his determination of the characters of the Devonian System, by observations of the order of superposition of the Killas rocks & their fossils in Devonshire"	
1864		Charles Darwin	"For his important researches in geology, zoology, and botanical physiology"	
1865		Michel Chasles	"For his historical and original researches in pure geometry"	
1866		Julius Plücker	"For his researches in analytical geometry, magnetism, & spectral analysis"	
1867		Karl Ernst von Baer	"For his discoveries in embryology and comparative anatomy, and for his contributions to the philosophy of zoology"	
1868		Charles Wheatstone	"For his researches in acoustics, optics, electricity and magnetism"	
1869		Henri Victor Regnault	"For the second volume of his Relation des Experiences pour determiner les lois et les donnees physiques necessaires au calcul des machines a feu, including his elaborate investigations on the specific heat of gases and vapours, and various papers on the elastic force of vapours"	
1870		James Prescott Joule	"For his experimental researches on the dynamical theory of heat"	
1871		Julius von Mayer	"For his researches on the mechanics of heat; including essays on: – 1. The force of inorganic nature. 2. Organic motion in connection with nutrition. 3. Fever. 4. Celestial dynamics. 5. The mechanical equivalent of heat"	
1872		Friedrich Wöhler	"For his numerous contributions to the science of chemistry, and more especially for his researches on the products of the decomposition of cyanogens by ammonia; on the derivatives of uric acid; on the benzoyl series; on boron, silicon, & their compounds; and on meteoric stones"	
1873		Hermann von Helmholtz	"For his researches in physics and physiology"	
1874		Louis Pasteur	"For his researches on fermentation and on pelerine"	
1875		August Wilhelm von Hofmann	"For his numerous contributions to the science of chemistry, and especially for his researches on the derivatives of ammonia"	
1876		Claude Bernard	"For his numerous contributions to the science of physiology"	
1877		James Dwight Dana	"For his biological, geological, and mineralogical investigations, carried on through half a century, and for the valuable works in which his conclusions and discoveries have been published"	
1878		Jean-Baptiste Boussingault	"For his long-continued and important researches and discoveries in agricultural chemistry"	
1879		Rudolf Clausius	"For his well-known researches upon heat"	
1880		James Joseph Sylvester	"For his long continued investigations & discoveries in mathematics"	
1881		Charles-Adolphe Wurtz	"For his discovery of the organic ammonias, the glycols, and other investigations which have exercised considerable influence on the progress of chemistry"	—
1882		Arthur Cayley	"For his numerous profound and comprehensive researches in pure mathematics"	
1883		William Thomson	"For (1) his discovery of the law of the universal dissipation of energy; (2) his researches and eminent services in physics, both experimental & mathematical, especially in the theory of electricity and thermodynamics"	
1884		Carl Ludwig	"For his investigations in physiology, and the great services which he has rendered to physiological science"	—
1885		August Kekulé	"For his researches in organic chemistry"	
1886		Franz Ernst Neumann	"For his researches in theoretical optics and electro-dynamics"	
1887		Joseph Dalton Hooker	"For his services to botanical science as an investigator, author, and traveller"	
1888		Thomas Henry Huxley	"For his investigations on the morphology and histology of vertebrate and invertebrate animals, and for his services to biological science in general during many past years"	
1889		George Salmon	"For his various papers on subjects of pure mathematics, and for the valuable mathematical treatises of which he is the author"	
1890		Simon Newcomb	"For his contributions to the progress of gravitational astronomy"	
1891		Stanislao Cannizzaro	"For his contributions to chemical philosophy especially for his application of Avogadros theory"	
1892		Rudolf Virchow	"For his investigations in pathology, pathological anatomy, and prehistoric archaeology"	
1893		George Stokes	"For his researches and discoveries in physical science"	
1894		Edward Frankland	"For his eminent services to theoretical & applied chemistry"	
1895		Karl Weierstrass	"For his investigations in pure mathematics"	
1896		Carl Gegenbaur	"For his life-long researches in comparative anatomy in all branches of the animal kingdom. etc., etc"	—
1897		Albert von Kölliker	"In recognition of his important work in embryology, comparative anatomy, and physiology, and especially for his eminence as a histologist"	—
1898		William Huggins	"For his researches in spectrum analysis applied to the heavenly bodies"	
1899		Lord Rayleigh	"In recognition of his contributions to physical science"	
1900		Marcellin Berthelot	"For his brilliant services to chemical science"	
1901		Josiah Willard Gibbs	"For his contributions to mathematical physics"	
1902		Joseph Lister	"In recognition of the value of his physiological and pathological researches in regard to their influence on the modern practice of surgery"	
1903		Eduard Suess	"For his eminent geological services, & especially for the original researches & conclusions published in his great work 'Das Antlitz der Erde'"	
1904		William Crookes	"For his long-continued researches in spectroscopic chemistry, on electrical & mechanical phenomena in highly-rarefied gases, on radio-active phenomena, and other subjects"	
1905		Dmitri Mendeleev	"For his contributions to chemical and physical science"	
1906		Élie Metchnikoff	"On the ground of the importance of his work in zoology and in pathology"	
1907		Albert Abraham Michelson	"On the ground of his investigations in optics"	
1908		Alfred Russel Wallace	"On the ground of the great value of his numerous contributions to natural history, and of the part he took in working out the theory of the origin of species by natural selection"	
1909		George William Hill	"On the ground of his researches in mathematical astronomy"	
1910		Francis Galton	"On the ground of his researches in heredity"	
1911		George Darwin	"On the ground of his researches on tidal theory, the figures of the planets, and allied subjects"	
1912		Felix Klein	"On the ground of his researches in mathematics"	
1913		Ray Lankester	"On the ground of the high scientific value of the researches in zoology carried out by him"	
1914		Joseph John Thomson	"On the ground of his discoveries in physical science"	
1915		Ivan Pavlov	"On the ground of his investigations in the physiology of digestion and of the higher centres of the nervous system"	
1916		James Dewar	"For his important investigations in physical chemistry, more especially his researches on the liquefaction of gases"	
1917		Pierre Paul Émile Roux	"On the ground of his eminence as a bacteriologist, and as a pioneer in serum therapy"	
1918		Hendrik Lorentz	"On the ground of his distinguished researches in mathematical physics"	
1919		William Bayliss	"On the ground of his researches in general physiology & biophysics"	
1920		Horace Tabberer Brown	"On the ground of his work on the chemistry of carbohydrates, &c"	
1921		Joseph Larmor	"For his researches in mathematical physics"	
1922		Ernest Rutherford	"For his researches in radio activity & atomic structure"	
1923		Horace Lamb	"For his researches in mathematical physics"	
1924		Edward Albert Sharpey-Schafer	"For the valuable work he has done in physiology and histology and the position he now occupies as a leader in these sciences"	—
1925		Albert Einstein	"For his theory of relativity and his contributions to the quantum theory"	
1926		Frederick Gowland Hopkins	"For his distinguished and fruitful work in biochemistry"	
1927		Charles Scott Sherrington	"For his distinguished work on neurology"	
1928		Charles Algernon Parsons	"For his contributions to engineering science"	—
1929		Max Planck	"For his contributions to theoretical physics and especially as the originator of the quantum theory"	
1930		William Henry Bragg	"For his distinguished contributions to crystallography and radioactivity"	
1931		Arthur Schuster	"For his distinguished researches in optics and terrestrial magnetism"	
1932		George Ellery Hale	"For his distinguished work on the solar magnetic phenomena and for his eminence as a scientific engineer, especially in connexion with Mount Wilson Observatory"	
1933		Theobald Smith	"For his original research and observation on diseases of animals and man"	
1934		John Scott Haldane	"In recognition of his discoveries in human physiology and of their application to medicine, mining, diving and engineering"	
1935		Charles Thomson Rees Wilson	"For his work on the use of clouds in advancing our knowledge of atoms and their properties"	
1936		Arthur Evans	"In recognition of his pioneer work in Crete, particularly his contributions to the history and civilization of its Minoan age"	
1937		Henry Dale	"In recognition of his important contributions to physiology and pharmacology, particularly in relation to the nervous and neuro-muscular systems"	
1938		Niels Bohr	"In recognition of his distinguished work in the development of the quantum theory of atomic structure"	
1939		Thomas Hunt Morgan	"For his establishment of the modern science of genetics which had revolutionized our understanding, not only of heredity, but of the mechanism and nature of evolution"	
1940		Paul Langevin	"For his pioneer work on the electron theory of magnetism, his fundamental contributions to discharge of electricity in gases, and his important work in many branches of theoretical physics"	
1941		Thomas Lewis	"For his clinical and experimental investigations upon the mammalian heart"	
1942		Robert Robinson	"For his research work of outstanding originality and brilliance which has influenced the whole field of organic chemistry"	
1943		Joseph Barcroft	"For his distinguished work on respiration and the respiratory function of the blood"	
1944		G. I. Taylor	"For his many contributions to aerodynamics, hydrodynamics, and the structure of metals, which have had a profound influence on the advance of physical science and its applications"	
1945		Oswald Avery	"For his success in introducing chemical methods in the study of immunity against infective diseases"	
1946		Edgar Adrian	"For his distinguished researches on the fundamental nature of nervous activity, and recently on the localization of certain nervous functions"	
1947		G. H. Hardy	"For his distinguished part in the development of mathematical analysis in England during the last thirty years"	
1948		Archibald Hill	"For his distinguished researches on myothermal problems and on biophysical phenomena in nerve and other tissues"	
1949		George de Hevesy	"For his distinguished work on the chemistry of radioactive elements and especially for his development of the radioactive tracer techniques in the investigation of biological processes"	
1950		James Chadwick	"For his outstanding work in nuclear physics and in the development of atomic energy, especially for his discovery of the neutron"	
1951		David Keilin	"For his fundamental researches in the fields of protozoology, entomology and the biochemistry of enzymes"	
1952		Paul Dirac	"In recognition of his remarkable contributions to relativistic dynamics of a particle in quantum mechanics"	
1953		Albert Kluyver	"For his distinguished contributions of a fundamental character to the science of microbiology"	—
1954		E. T. Whittaker	"For his distinguished contributions to both pure and applied mathematics and to theoretical physics"	
1955		Ronald Fisher	"In recognition of his numerous and distinguished contributions to developing the theory and application of statistics for making quantitative a vast field of biology"	
1956		Patrick Blackett	"In recognition of his outstanding studies of cosmic ray showers and heavy mesons and in the field of palaeomagnetism"	—
1957		Howard Florey	"In recognition of his distinguished contributions to experimental pathology and medicine"	
1958		John Edensor Littlewood	"In recognition of his distinguished contributions to many branches of analysis, including Tauberian theory, the Riemann zeta function, and non-linear differential equations"	
1959		Frank Macfarlane Burnet	"In recognition of his distinguished contributions to knowledge of viruses and of immunology"	
1960		Harold Jeffreys	"In recognition of his distinguished work in many branches of geophysics, and also in the theory of probability and astronomy"	
1961		Hans Adolf Krebs	"In recognition of his distinguished contributions to biochemistry, in particular his work on the ornithine, tricarboxylic acid and glyoxylate cycles"	
1962		Cyril Norman Hinshelwood	"In recognition of his distinguished researches in the field of chemical kinetics, including the study of biological reaction mechanisms, and of his outstanding contributions to natural philosophy"	
1963		Paul Fildes	"In recognition of his pioneering contributions to bacteriology."	—
1964		Sydney Chapman	"In recognition of his theoretical contributions to terrestrial and interplanetary magnetism, the ionosphere and the aurora borealis"	
1965		Alan Lloyd Hodgkin	"In recognition of his discovery of the mechanism of excitation and impulse conduction in nerve, and his outstanding leadership in the development of neurophysiology"	—
1966		William Lawrence Bragg	"In recognition of his distinguished contributions to the development of methods of structural determination by X-ray diffraction"	
1967		Bernard Katz	"In recognition of his distinguished contributions to knowledge of the fundamental processes involved in transmission across the neuromuscular junction"	—
1968		Tadeusz Reichstein	"In recognition of his distinguished work on the chemistry of vitamin C and his authoritative studies of the cortico-steroids"	—
1969		Peter Medawar	"In recognition of his distinguished studies of tissue transplantation and immunological tolerance"	
1970		Alexander R. Todd	"In recognition of his outstanding contributions to both the analytical and synthetic chemistry of natural products of diverse types"	
1971		Norman Pirie	"In recognition of his distinguished contributions to biochemistry and especially for his elucidation of the nature of plant viruses"	—
1972		Nevill Francis Mott	"In recognition of his original contributions over a long period to atomic and solid state physics"	
1973		Andrew Huxley	"In recognition of his outstanding studies on the mechanisms of the nerve impulse and of activation of muscular contraction"	—
1974		W. V. D. Hodge	"In recognition of his pioneering work in algebraic geometry, notably in his theory of harmonic integrals"	
1975		Francis Crick	"In recognition of his elucidation of the structure of DNA and his continuing contribution to molecular biology"	
1976		Dorothy Hodgkin	"In recognition of her outstanding work on the structures of complex molecules, particularly Penicillin, vitamin B_{12} and insulin"	
1977		Frederick Sanger	"In recognition of his distinguished work on the chemical structure of proteins and his studies on the sequences of nucleic acids"	
1978		Robert Burns Woodward	"In recognition of his masterly contributions to the synthesis of complex natural products and his discovery of the importance of orbital symmetry"	
1979		Max Perutz	"In recognition of his distinguished contributions to molecular biology through his own studies of the structure and biological activity of haemoglobin and his leadership in the development of the subject"	
1980		Derek Barton	"In recognition of his distinguished contributions to a wide range of problems in structural and synthetic organic chemistry and, in particular, his introduction of conformational analysis into stereochemistry"	
1981		Peter D. Mitchell	"In recognition of his distinguished contribution to biology in his formulation and development of the chemiosmotic theory of energy transduction"	
1982		John Cornforth	"In recognition of his distinguished research on the stereochemically-controlled synthesis and biosynthesis of biologically important molecules"	
1983		Rodney Robert Porter	"In recognition of his elucidation of the structure of immunoglobulins and of the reactions involved in activating the complement system of proteins"	—
1984		Subrahmanyan Chandrasekhar	"In recognition of his distinguished work on theoretical physics, including stellar structure, theory of radiation, hydrodynamic stability and relativity"	
1985		Aaron Klug	"In recognition of his outstanding contributions to our understanding of complex biological structures and the methods used for determining them"	—
1986		Rudolf Peierls	"In recognition of his fundamental contributions to a very wide range of theoretical physics, and signal advances in proposing the probable existence of nuclear chain reactions in fissile materials"	—
1987		Robin Hill	"In recognition of his pioneering contributions to the understanding of the nature and mechanism of the main pathway of electron transport in photosynthesis"	—
1988		Michael Atiyah	"In recognition of his fundamental contributions to a wide range of topics in geometry, topology, analysis and theoretical physics"	
1989		César Milstein	"In recognition of his outstanding contributions to immunology, in particular to the discovery of monoclonal antibodies and to the understanding of the role of somatic mutations in the maturation of the immune response"	—
1990		Abdus Salam	"In recognition of his work on the symmetries of the laws of nature, and especially the unification of the electromagnetic and weak forces"	
1991		Sydney Brenner	"In recognition of his many contributions to molecular genetics and developmental biology, and his recent role in the Human Genome mapping project"	—
1992		George Porter	"In recognition of his contributions to fundamental understanding of fast photochemical and photophysical processes and their role in chemistry and biology"	
1993		James Watson	"In recognition of his tireless pursuit of DNA, from the elucidation of its structure to the social and medical implications of the sequencing of the human genome"	
1994		Charles Frank	"In recognition of his fundamental contribution to the theory of crystal morphology, in particular to the source of dislocations and their consequences in interfaces and crystal growth; to fundamental understanding of liquid crystals and the concept of disclination; and to the extension of crystallinity concepts to aperiodic crystals. He has also contributed through a variety of remarkable insights into a great number of physical problems"	—
1995		Frank Fenner	"In recognition of his contribution to animal virology with special emphasis on the pox and myxomatosis viruses and their relationship with the host in causing disease"	—
1996		Alan Cottrell	"In recognition of his contribution to the understanding of mechanical properties of materials and related topics through his pioneering studies on crystal plasticity, dislocation impurity interactions, fracture and irradiation effects"	
1997		Hugh Huxley	"In recognition of his pioneering work on the structure of muscle and on the molecular mechanisms of muscle contraction, providing solutions to one of the great problems in physiology"	—
1998		James Lighthill	"In recognition of his profound contributions to many fields within fluid mechanics including important aspects of the interaction of sound and fluid flow and numerous other contributions which have had practical applications in aircraft engine design. He is noted also for his ground-breaking work on both external bio-fluid-dynamics – analysis of mechanisms of swimming and flying – and internal bio-fluid-dynamics, including flow in the cardiovascular system and the airways, and cochlear mechanics and other aspects of hearing"	
1999		John Maynard Smith	"In recognition of his seminal contributions to evolutionary biology, including his experimental work on sexual selection, his important contributions to our understanding of ageing, his introduction of game theoretical methods for the analysis of complex evolutionary scenarios and his research into molecular evolution, both through his classic work on genetic hitchhiking, and with his more recent, ongoing work on bacterial population growth"	
2000		Alan R. Battersby	"In recognition of his pioneering work in elucidating the detailed biosynthetic pathways to all the major families of plant alkaloids. His approach, which stands as a paradigm for future biosynthetic studies on complex molecules, combines isolation work, structure determination, synthesis, isotopic labelling and spectroscopy, especially advanced NMR, as well as genetics and molecular biology. This spectacular research revealed the entire pathway to vitamin B_{12}"	—
2001		Jacques Miller	"For his work on the immunological function of the thymus and of T cells, which has revolutionised the science of immunology. Professor Millers work is paving the way for designing new methods to improve resistance to infections, producing new vaccines, enhancing graft survival, dealing with autoimmunity and even persuading the immune system to reject cancer cells"	—
2002		John Pople	"For his development of computational methods in quantum chemistry. His work transformed density functional theory into a powerful theoretical tool for chemistry, chemical physics and biology"	
2003		John Gurdon	"For his unique range of groundbreaking discoveries in the fields of cell and developmental biology. He pioneered the concept that specialised cells are genetically equivalent and that they differ only in the genes they express not the genes they contain, a concept fundamental to modern biology"	—
2004		Harry Kroto	"in recognition of his seminal contributions to understanding the fundamental dynamics of carbon chain molecules, leading to the detection of these species (polyynes) in the interstellar medium by radioastronomy, and thence to the genesis of a new era in carbon science"	
2005		Paul Nurse	"for his contributions to cell biology in general, and to the elucidation of the control of cell division."	—
2006		Stephen Hawking	"For his outstanding contribution to theoretical physics and theoretical cosmology. "	
2007		Robert May	"for his seminal studies of interactions within and among biological populations that have reshaped our understanding of how species, communities and entire ecosystems respond to natural or human created disturbance."	—
2008		Roger Penrose	"for his beautiful and original insights into many areas of mathematics and mathematical physics. Sir Roger has made outstanding contributions to general relativity theory and cosmology, most notably for his work on black holes and the Big Bang."	—
2009		Martin Evans	"for his seminal work on embryonic stem cells in mice, which revolutionised the field of genetics."	—
2010		David Cox	"for his seminal contributions to the theory and applications of statistics."	
2010		Tomas Lindahl	"for his seminal contributions to the understanding of the biochemistry of DNA repair."	
2011		Dan McKenzie	"For his seminal contributions to the understanding of geological and geophysical phenomena including tectonic plates."	—
2012		John Walker	"For his ground-breaking work on bioenergetics, discovering the mechanism of ATP synthesis in the mitochondrion."	
2013		Andre Geim	"For his numerous scientific contributions and, in particular, for initiating research on two‐dimensional atomic crystals and their artificial heterostructures."	—
2014		Alec Jeffreys	"For his pioneering work on variation and mutation in the human genome."	
2015		Peter Higgs	"For his fundamental contribution to particle physics with his theory explaining the origin of mass in elementary particles, confirmed by the experiments at the Large Hadron Collider."	
2016		Richard Henderson	"In recognition of his fundamental and revolutionary contributions to the development of electron microscopy of biological materials, enabling their atomic structures to be deduced."	
2017		Andrew Wiles	"For his beautiful and unexpected proof of Fermat's Last Theorem which is one of the most important mathematical achievements of the 20th century."	
2018		Jeffrey I. Gordon	"For his contributions to understanding the role of gut microbial communities to human health and disease."	
2019		John B. Goodenough	"In recognition of his exceptional contributions to the science and technology of materials, including his discovery that led to rechargeable lithium batteries."	
2020		Alan Fersht	"He has developed and applied the methods of protein engineering to provide descriptions of protein folding pathways at atomic resolution, revolutionising our understanding of these processes."	
2021		Jocelyn Bell Burnell	"for her work on the discovery of pulsars, one of the major astronomical discoveries of the 20th century"	
2022		Oxford-AstraZeneca Vaccine Team	"for rapidly developing and deploying a COVID-19 vaccine."	
2023		Martin Rees	"for being arguably the most distinguished theoretical astrophysicist of his generation, responsible for numerous and varied conceptual breakthroughs, with influence spreading far beyond the specialist academic community."	
2024		Gregory Paul Winter	"for pioneering protein engineering, especially antibody engineering for the successful production of therapeutic antibodies."	
2025		John Pendry	"for work on the concept and designs of metamaterials that represent the greatest advance in electromagnetism since Faraday and Maxwell."	
2026		Bonnie L. Bassler	"for her discovery of the universality of chemical communication among bacteria, and for her dogma-overturning idea that interfering with bacterial communication could form the basis of completely novel anti-bacterials."	

== See also ==
- List of biology awards
- List of chemistry awards
- List of geology awards
- List of mathematics awards
- List of physics awards
