= Peter Edwards (chemist) =

British chemist

Peter Philip Edwards
- Born: 30 June 1949 (age 77); Toxteth, Liverpool, UK
- Education: University of Salford
- Known for: Solid-State Chemistry, the Metal-Insulator Transition, utilisation of CO2
- Awards: Hughes Medal (2003); Chinese Academy of Sciences Einstein Professor (2011); Royal Society Bakerian Medal (2012)
- Scientific career
- Fields: Chemistry, Physics
- Workplaces: University of Oxford

Peter Philip Edwards FRSC FRS (born 1949, Liverpool) is a British Emeritus Professor of Inorganic Chemistry and former Head of Inorganic Chemistry at the University of Oxford and a Fellow of St Catherine's College, Oxford. Edwards is the recipient of the Corday-Morgan Medal (1985), the Tilden Lectureship (1993–94) and Liversidge Award (1999) of the Royal Society of Chemistry. He was elected a Fellow of the Royal Society in 1996 and was awarded the 2003 Hughes Medal of the Royal Society "for his distinguished work as a solid state chemist. He has made seminal contributions to fields including superconductivity and the behaviour of metal nanoparticles, and has greatly advanced our understanding of the phenomenology of the metal-insulator transition". In 2009 Edwards was elected to the German Academy of Sciences Leopoldina, and he was elected Einstein Professor for 2011 by the Chinese Academy of Sciences. In 2012 he was awarded the Bakerian Lecture by the Royal Society "in recognition of decisive contributions to the physics, chemistry and materials science of condensed matter, including work on the metal-insulator transition". In the spring of 2012 he was elected International Member of the American Philosophical Society; one of only four people from the UK in that year to be awarded this honour across all subjects and disciplines. Later in 2012 he was awarded the Worshipful Company of Armourers and Brasiers Materials Science Venture Prize for his work on new, low-cost, high-performance conducting oxide coatings for solar cells and optoelectronic materials. In the Autumn of 2013 he was elected Member of Academia Europaea, and he was elected as a Foreign Honorary Member of the American Academy of Arts and Sciences in 2014.

Together with Tiancun Xiao and John Thomas and their teams Edwards demonstrated in 2020 a new method using microwaves to initiate the catalytic decomposition of plastic waste to generate hydrogen and multiwalled carbon nanotubes. This approach was subsequently developed by the spin-out company Oxford Sustainable Fuels. As of 2022 Edwards was working with CarbonMeta Technologies to commercialise the approach. He is a founder of and scientific consultant for OXCCU.

== Selected publications ==
- Edwards, Peter Phillip; Sienko, Michell J. (1978). "Universality Aspects of the Metal-Nonmetal Transition in Condensed Media". Phys. Rev. B. 17 (6): 2575–2581. Bibcode:1978PhRvB..17.2575E. doi:10.1103/PhysRevB.17.2575.
- Edwards, P. P.; Rao, C. N. N., eds. (1985). The Metallic and Non-metallic States of Matter. London: Taylor & Francis.
- Edwards, P. P.; Mott, N. F.; Alexandrov, A. S. (1998). "The Insulator-Superconductor Transformation in Cuprates". J. Supercond. 11 (1): 151–154. Bibcode:1998JSup...11..151E. doi:10.1023/A:1022699711372. S2CID 118066529.
- Grochala, Wojciech; Edwards, Peter P. (2004). "Thermal Decomposition of the Non-Interstitial Hydrides for the Storage and Production of Hydrogen". Chem. Rev. 104 (3): 1283–1315. doi:10.1021/cr030691s. PMID 15008624.
- Zurek, Eva; Edwards, Peter P.; Hoffmann, Roald (2009). "A Molecular Perspective on Lithium–Ammonia Solutions". Angew. Chem. Int. Ed. 48 (44): 8198–8232. Bibcode:2009ACIE...48.8198Z. doi:10.1002/anie.200900373. PMID 19821473.
- Jiang, Z.; Xiao, T.; Kuznetsov, V. L.; Edwards, P. P. (2010). "Turning carbon dioxide into fuel". Phil. Trans. R. Soc. A. 368 (1923): 3343–3364. Bibcode:2010RSPTA.368.3343J. doi:10.1098/rsta.2010.0119. PMID 20566515.
- Pearson, Richard J.; Eisaman, Matthew D.; Turner, James W. G.; Edwards, Peter P.; Jiang, Zheng; Kuznetsov, Vladimir L.; Littau, Karl A.; di Marco, Leon; Taylor, S. R. Gordon (2011). "Energy Storage via Carbon-Neutral Fuels Made From CO2, Water, and Renewable Energy". Proceedings of the IEEE. 100 (2): 440–460. doi:10.1109/JPROC.2011.2168369. S2CID 3560886.
- Yao, B., Kuznetsov, V. L., Xiao, T., Jie, X., Gonzalez-Cortes, S., Dilworth, J. R., Al-Megren, H.A., Alshihri, S.M. & Edwards, P. P. (2020). Fuels, power and chemical periodicity. Phil. Trans. R. Soc. A., 378(2180), 20190308. doi:10.1098/rsta.2019.0308.
- Yao, B., Kuznetsov, V. L., Xiao, T., Slocombe, D. R., Rao, C. N. R., Hensel, F., & Edwards, P. P. (2020). Metals and non-metals in the periodic table. Phil. Trans. R. Soc. A., 378(2180), 20200213. doi:10.1098/rsta.2020.0213.
- Jie, X., Li, W., Slocombe, D., Gao, Y., Banerjee, I., Gonzalez-Cortes, S., Yao, B., AlMegren, H., Alshihri, S., Dilworth, J. Thomas, J. Xiao, T., & Edwards, P. P. (2020). Microwave-initiated catalytic deconstruction of plastic waste into hydrogen and high-value carbons. Nature Catalysis, 3(11), 902–912. doi:10.1038/s41929-020-00518-5.
- Yao, B., Xiao, T., Makgae, O. A., Jie, X., Gonzalez-Cortes, S., Guan, S., Kirkland, A.I., Dilworth, J.R., Al-Megren, H.A., Alshihri, S.M., Dobson, P. J., Owen, G. P., Thomas J. M., & Edwards, P. P. (2020). Transforming carbon dioxide into jet fuel using an organic combustion-synthesized Fe-Mn-K catalyst. Nature Communications, 11(1), 1–12. doi:10.1038/s41467-020-20214-z.
