= John Belchier =

British surgeon

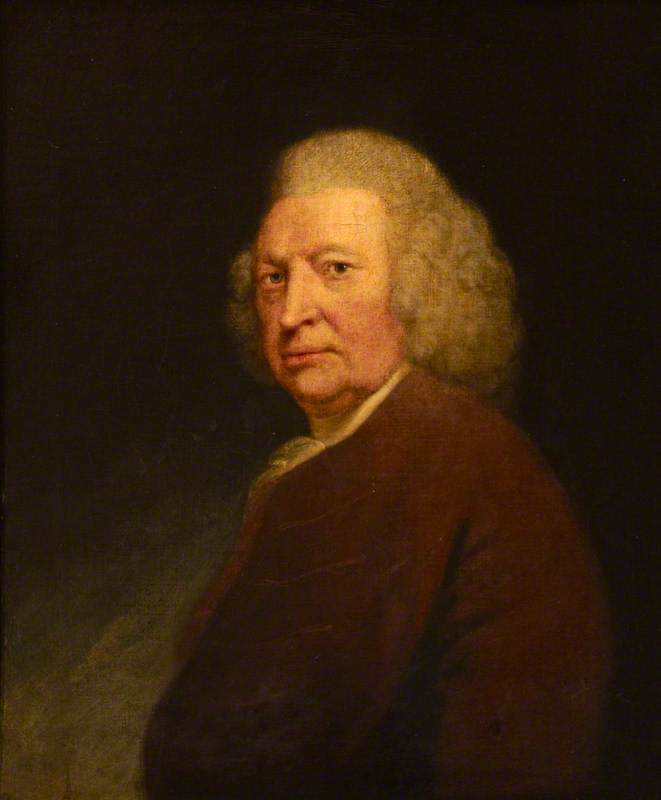
1785 portrait of Belchier by Ozias Humphry

John Belchier (also Belcher, Belchar) (bap. 1706 – 6 February 1785) was a British surgeon at Guy's Hospital from 1736 to 1768.

== Life ==
He was the son of James Belchier of Kingston, Surrey, and was educated at Eton College. He then became an apprentice to William Cheselden of St Thomas's Hospital. He was elected a Fellow of the Royal Society in 1732.

Belchier discovered at about the time of his Guy's appointment that the vegetable dye madder stained newly forming bone tissue, opening up the study of the growth and development of the skeleton. He was awarded the Copley Medal of the Royal Society in 1737. This research direction was taken forward by Henri-Louis Duhamel du Monceau and John Hunter.

Belchier was a member of the Court of Assistants at the Company of Surgeons; in 1766 he was one of two representatives of Guy's on the body of six, with Joseph Warner. He was on the 1768 list of governors and guardians of the Foundling Hospital.

== Associations ==
Belchier was a friend of Georg Frideric Handel, who left money to him and his servants. He was on good terms too with the poet Alexander Pope and the sculptor Louis-François Roubiliac. Pope asked Belchier to act as intermediary with Handel, in an attempt to get Handel to set his Ode for Musick (Euridice, 1708, published 1713) to music. This was in 1739. Handel objected: Maurice Greene had already set a version in 1730. He and Handel had fallen out, the reason being, according to John Hawkins, Handel's feeling that Greene was too interested in his rival Giovanni Bononcini. Belchier's name occurs in the provenance of a Roubiliac bust of Pope, now at the Barber Institute of Fine Arts.
