= Francis Henry Neville =

British metallurgist

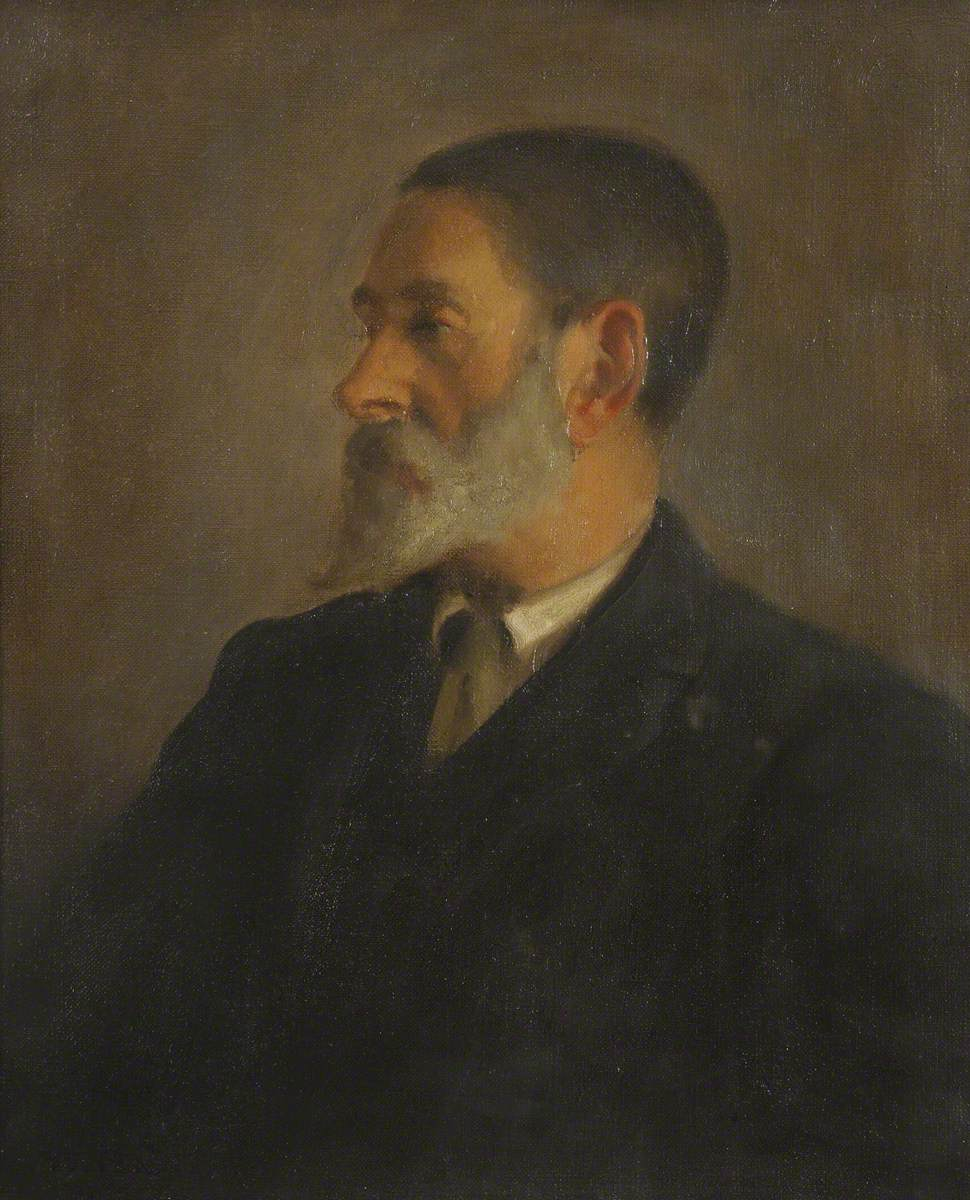
- Portrait of Neville by William Hammond Smith
- Born: 2 December 1847; Exeter, Devon
- Died: 5 June 1915 (aged 67); Letchworth, Hertfordshire
- Citizenship: British
- Education: BA 1867, MA 1874, both from Sidney Sussex College, Cambridge
- Spouse: Lilian Eunice Luxmore (married 25th March 1884)
- Scientific career
- Fields: Metallurgy
- Workplaces: Sidney Sussex College, Cambridge

Francis Henry Neville FRS (2 December 1847 - 5 June 1915) was a British metallurgist known chiefly for his work on alloys with Charles Heycock.

== Early life and education ==
Neville was born 2nd December 1847 in Exeter, Devon, as the fifth son of Alfred Ella Neville and Lilian née Eunice. He attended Exeter School, before entering Sidney Sussex College, Cambridge 30th September 1867. He graduated with a BA in 1867 (as 15th wrangler) and an MA in 1874, becoming a Fellow of the college in 1871.

== Career ==
Neville remained at Sidney Sussex for his entire career, where he lectured on physics and chemistry. He worked extensively with Charles Heycock on the metallurgy of alloys. He served as Proctor for the 1887-88 academic year alongside Robert Forsyth Scott.

Neville also wrote the articles on alloys, atoms and metallography for the 11th edition of Encyclopaedia Britannica.

== Personal life ==
Neville married Lilian Eunice Luxmore on 25th March 1884, a marriage which lasted until her death in 1910.

He was a member of the Climbers' Club and the Cambridge Cruising Club.

Neville died 5th June 1915 in Letchworth, Hertfordshire.

== Recognition ==
Neville was elected a Fellow of the Royal Society in 1897. He shared the Bakerian Medal with Charles Heycock in 1903, delivering a lecture entitled "On the Constitution of the Copper-tin Series of Alloys".
