= Samuel Vince =

English clergyman, mathematician and astronomer (1749–1821)

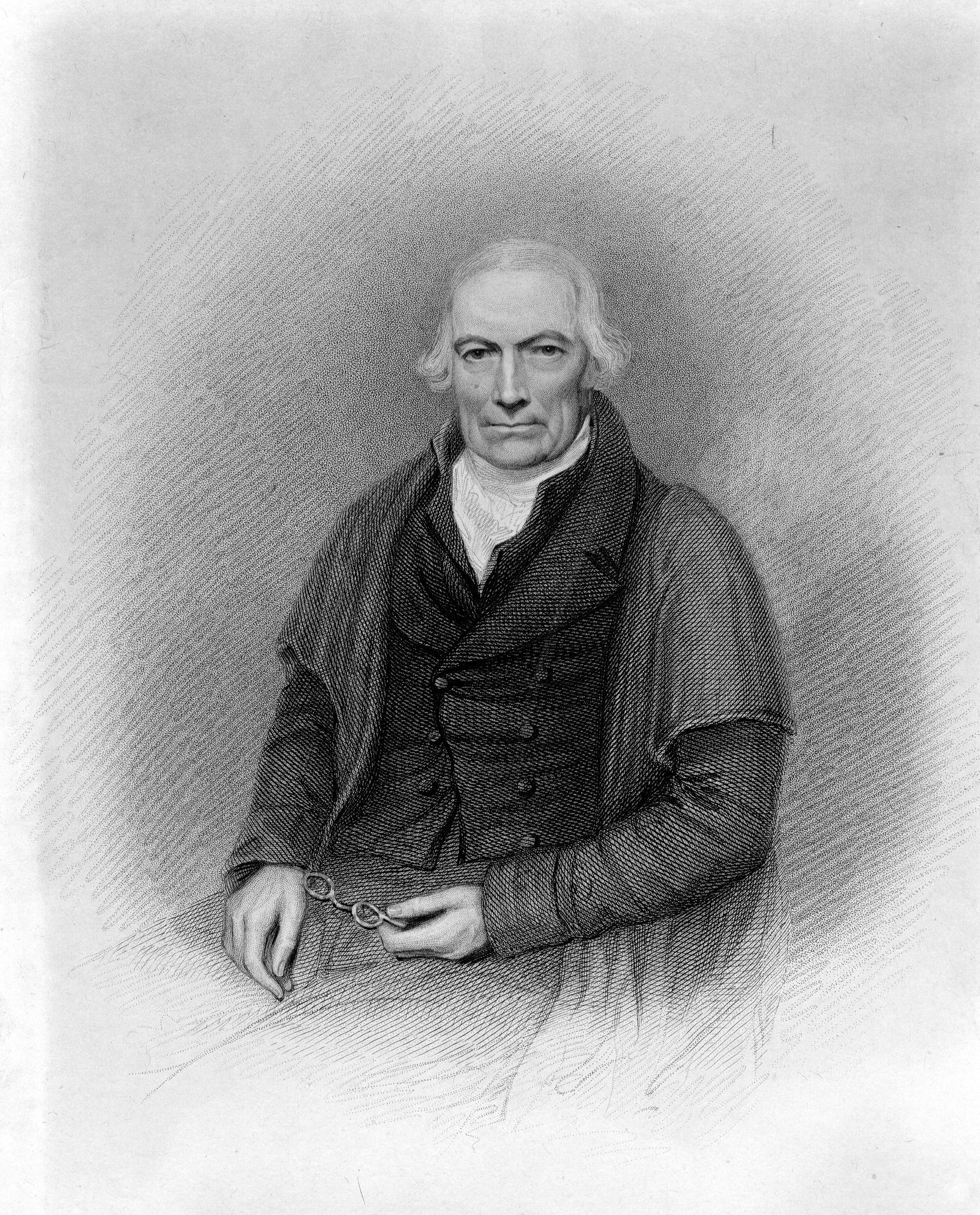
Samuel Vince

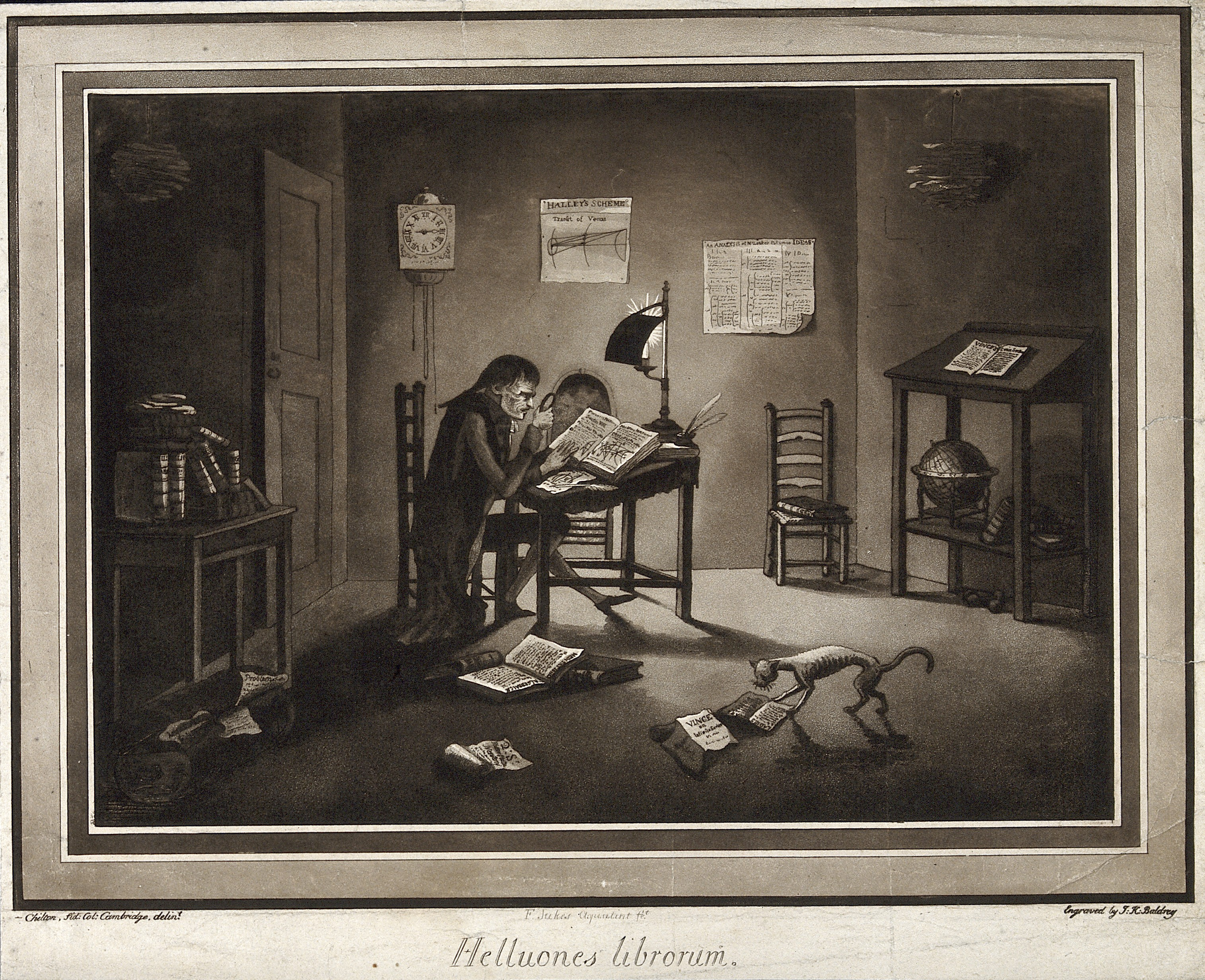
Vince at Cambridge

Samuel Vince FRS (6 April 1749 – 28 November 1821) was an English clergyman, mathematician and astronomer at the University of Cambridge.

== Life ==
He was born in Fressingfield. The son of a plasterer, he had laboured with his father up to the age of 12, but came to the attention of a clergyman who saw to it that he entered higher education. Vince was admitted as a sizar to Caius College, Cambridge in 1771. In 1775 he was Senior Wrangler, and Winner of the Smith Prize at Cambridge. Migrating to Sidney Sussex College in 1777, he gained his M.A. in 1778 and was ordained a clergyman in 1779. He was among seven men of that college who subscribed to the Abolition Society in 1787.

He was awarded the Copley Medal in 1780 and was Plumian Professor of Astronomy and Experimental Philosophy at Cambridge from 1796 until his death. He became Archdeacon of Bedford in 1809, and died in Ramsgate.

== Works ==
As a mathematician, Vince wrote on many aspects of his expertise, including logarithms and imaginary numbers. His Observations on the Theory of the Motion and Resistance of Fluids and Experiments upon the Resistance of Bodies Moving in Fluids had later importance to aviation history. He was also author of the influential A Complete System of Astronomy (3 vols. 1797–1808).

Vince also published the pamphlet The Credibility of Christianity Vindicated, In Answer to Mr. Hume's Objections; In Two Discourses Preached Before the University of Cambridge by the Rev. S. Vince. In this work, Vince made an apology of the Christian religion and, like Charles Babbage, sought to present rational arguments in favor of the belief in miracles, against David Hume's criticism. A review of this work with direct quotations can be found in The British Critic, Volume 12, 1798.
