= Charles Heycock =

British chemist and soldier

Charles Thomas Heycock
- Born: 21 August 1858; Bourn, Cambridgeshire
- Died: 3 June 1931 (aged 72); Cambridge
- Occupation: Chemist
- Awards: Davy Medal (1920)

Charles Thomas Heycock FRS (21 August 1858 – 3 June 1931) was a British chemist and soldier who was awarded the Royal Society's Davy Medal in 1920.

== Biography ==
Charles Thomas Heycock, the youngest of ten children of Frederick Heycock and Mary (née Heywood), was born on 21 August 1858 in Bourn, Cambridgeshire. He was educated at Bedford School, Oakham, and went up to King's College, Cambridge in 1877; he gained the Natural Sciences Tripos in 1880. After teaching for the Cambridge examinations, he was elected to a Fellowship at King’s College in 1895, and became a College Lecturer and Natural Sciences Tutor in the following year.

Heywood was elected a Fellow of the Royal Society in 1895 and awarded the Royal Society's Davy Medal in 1920, "on the ground of his work in physical chemistry and more especially on the composition & constitution of alloys". His original work on the metals inspired the Goldsmiths Company to endow a Readership in Metallurgy at Cambridge, to which Heywood was appointed in 1908. He was admitted to the Livery of the Company in 1909 and to the Court in 1913.

Heycock and his lifelong friend Francis Henry Neville, FRS published many papers on alloys. The two collaborators also worked on copper-tin and gold-aluminium alloys.

Heycock was lieutenant-colonel in command of the 3rd (Cambridgeshire) Volunteer battalion, the Suffolk Regiment, with the honorary rank of colonel, until he resigned in August 1902.

Satoyasu Iimori, was a Japanese chemist from RIKEN who learned under Heycock in 1919 - 1920.

Heycock was appointed a deputy lieutenant of Cambridgeshire in 1921.

=== Family ===
Heycock married Caroline Elizabeth Rosa Sadler on 28 August 1883 at St Mary the Virgin, Purton. They had a son and two daughters.

Charles Heycock died on 3 June 1931, and was buried on the 6th at Grantchester.

== Arms ==
Coat of arms of Charles Heycock
Motto Non Mihi Sed Patriae
