= Peter Woulfe =

Irish chemist

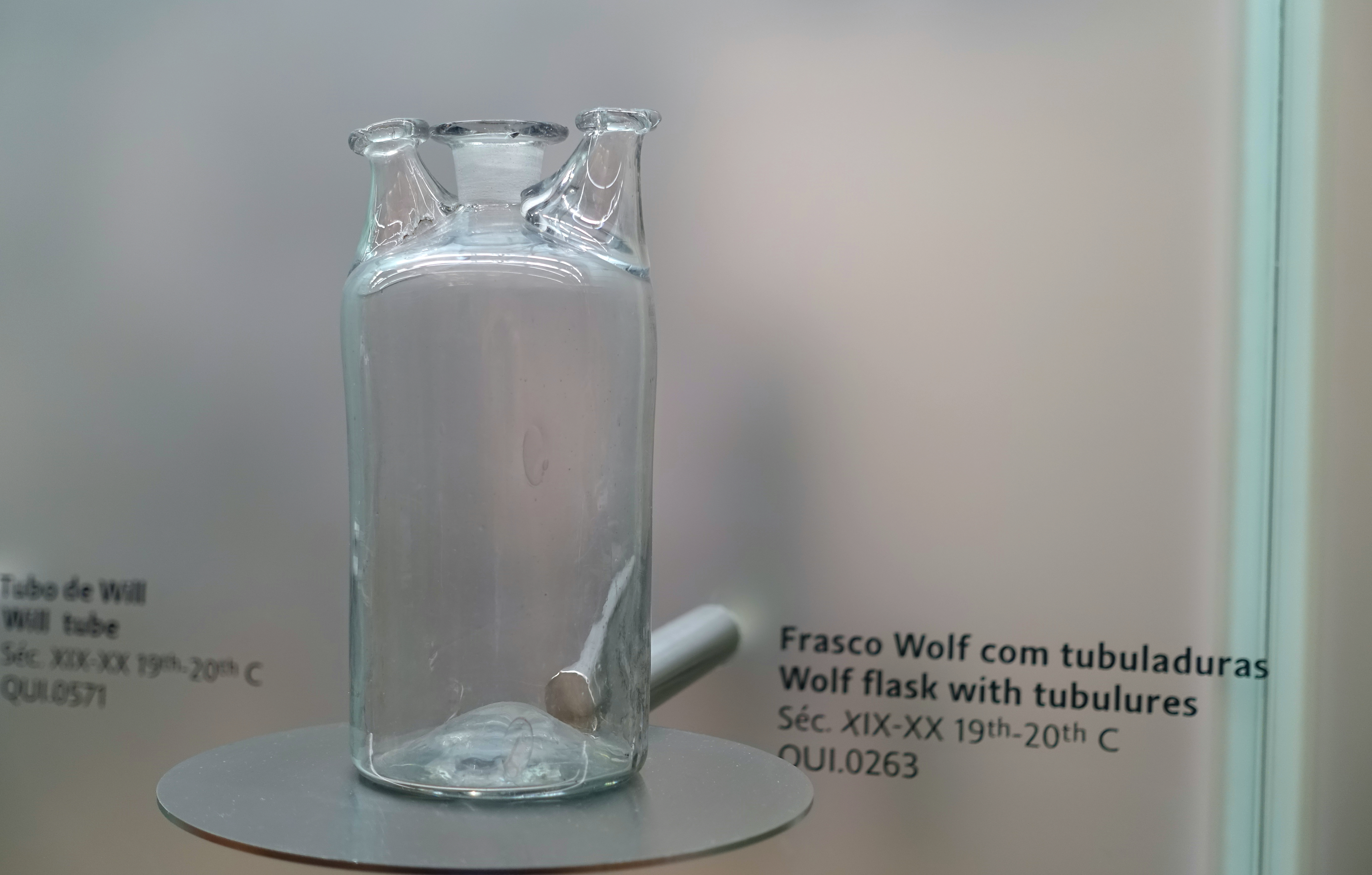
- Born: 1727; Tiermaclane, Ennis, County Clare, Ireland
- Died: 1803 (aged 75–76)
- Awards: Copley Medal (1768)
- Scientific career
- Fields: Chemistry mineralogist

Peter Woulfe (1727–1803) was an Anglo-Irish chemist and mineralogist. He first had the idea that wolframite might contain a previously undiscovered element (tungsten).

In 1771, Woulfe reported the formation of a yellow dye when indigo was treated with nitric acid.

Later it was discovered by others that he had formed picric acid, which eventually was used as the first synthetic dye, an explosive and an antiseptic treatment for burns.

Woulfe is credited with inventing, around 1767, the Woulfe's bottle, an apparatus for purifying or dissolving gases, which employed a bottle with two or three necks.

== Alchemy ==
Woulfe has been described as being as much an alchemist and mystic as a scientist. As recorded by John Timbs:

"The last true believer in alchemy was not Dr. Price, but Peter Woulfe, the eminent chemist, and Fellow of the Royal Society, and who made experiments to show the nature of mosaic gold [ tin(IV) sulfide, SnS_{2}]. […] He had long vainly searched for the Elixir, and attributed his repeated failures to the want of due preparation by pious and charitable acts. I understand that some of his apparatus is still extant, upon which are supplications for success and for the welfare of the adepts."
