= Satoyasu Iimori =

Japanese chemist (1885–1982)

- Born: 19 October 1885; Kanazawa City, Ishikawa Prefecture, Japan
- Died: 13 October 1982 (aged 96); Toshima-ku Sugamo, Tokyo, Japan
- Education: Tokyo Imperial University
- Scientific career
- Fields: Radiochemistry; Analytical Chemistry
- Workplaces: Institute of Physical and Chemical Research(RIKEN) (1917-1952 ); Tokyo Imperial University (1922-1941 ); Iimori Laboratory (1955-1982 )
- Academic advisors: Frederick Soddy

Satoyasu Iimori (19 October 1885 – 13 October 1982) was a Japanese analytical chemist and a pioneer of radiochemistry. He is so called "the father of radiochemistry in Japan", for his establishment of and contribution to the study of radiochemistry which was not developed at that time in Japan.

He was an honorary research member of the Institute of Physical and Chemical Research (RIKEN) and also an honorary member of the Chemical Society of Japan as well as the Society of the Analytical Chemistry of Japan. After his retirement as a researcher, he became interested in the synthesis of artificial gemstones.

== Biography ==
He was born in Kanazawa, Ishikawa prefecture, in 1885. In 1906 he entered the Department of Chemistry of Tokyo Imperial University, where he studied under Tamemasa Haga and Kikunae Ikeda. He continued his study in the graduate college of the university, and the Degree of Doctorate of Science was conferred for his research related to cyano-complex compounds of iron.

In 1917 he entered the Institute of Physical and Chemical Research (RIKEN), where he started to work in the research of analysis of various minerals. As he appointed to study radiochemistry, he went to U.K. in 1919. He was appointed to join the laboratory of Frederick Soddy, however due to the circumstance of Soddy he studied in the laboratory with Charles Heycock for a while, who was the chemist in the Cambridge University. He joined to work in the laboratory of Frederick Soddy from October 1920 until June 1921, in which his study was focused on the radiochemistry. After returning to Japan, he led his own laboratory as the chief researcher of RIKEN. Along with working for the research of radiochemistry, the laboratory conducted the research of analytical chemistry, mineralogical chemistry, photochemistry, geochemistry especially of rare elements, luminescence of minerals and ceramics as well.

During World War II, he contributed to the for search uranium ore, as part of the project "Ni-Goh Kenkyu" (Project NIGO), as his major research was mainly focused on radiochemical minerals. After the war the research of radiochemistry was prohibited by US authority, and he started to develop the field of ceramic materials and retired from RIKEN in 1952.

While he had his specific interest in the "actinolite" he tried to create it and this creation made him start the various creation of artificial gemstones. They are based on his own idea as a mineralogist. They were called "IL Stone", which had patented in 1955. He established "Iimori Laboratory, Ltd." to run the business for the creation and trading them. Some of those gemstones were exported mostly to the U.S. in 70's as well as traded in Japan.

== Translation "Isotope" into Japanese as "Doi genso ( 同位元素 )" ==
Iimori translated "Isotope" into Japanese as "Doi-genso". Isotope is the concept delivered in Soddy's lecture at the London Chemical Conference in 1918. The lecture was introduced in 1919 at the meeting of chemical laboratory of Tokyo Imperial University, where Iimori proposed to translate the word as " doi genso" in Japanese and it was assented immediately.

== Selected publications ==
- "Maßanalytische Bestimmung des Schwefelwasserstoffes in alkalischer Lösung mit Ferricyankalium", Japanese J. Chem., 1, 43 - 54 (1922)
- "Radioactive Manganiferous Nodules from Tanokami Oomi Province", Bull. Chem. Soc. Japan, 1, 43 - 47 (1926)
- "Formation of the Radioactive Manganiferous Deposits from Tanokami, and the Source of Manganese in the Deep-sea Manganese Nodules", Bull. Chem. Soc. Japan, 2, 270 - 273 (1927)
- "Photochemical Cell with Complex Cyanides of Nickel or Platinum", Sc.Pap.I.P.C.R.,'8, 14 - 15(1928)
- "The Uranium-Thorium Ratio in Monazite", Sc. Pap. I.P.C.R., 10, 229 - 236 (1929)
- "A Pink Kaolin, and Ruthenium as a Minor Constituent of the Tanokami Kaolin", Bull. Chem. Soc. Japan, 4, 1 - 5 (1929)
- "Periodicity in the Solarization of Calcite", Nature, 131, 619 (1933)
- "The Photoluminescence of Feldspar", Sc.Pap.I.P.C.R., 29, 79 - 110 (1936)

Sci.Pap.I.P.C.R:Scientific papers of the Institute of Physical and Chemical Research

== See also ==
- Japanese nuclear weapon program
