= Calderdale College =

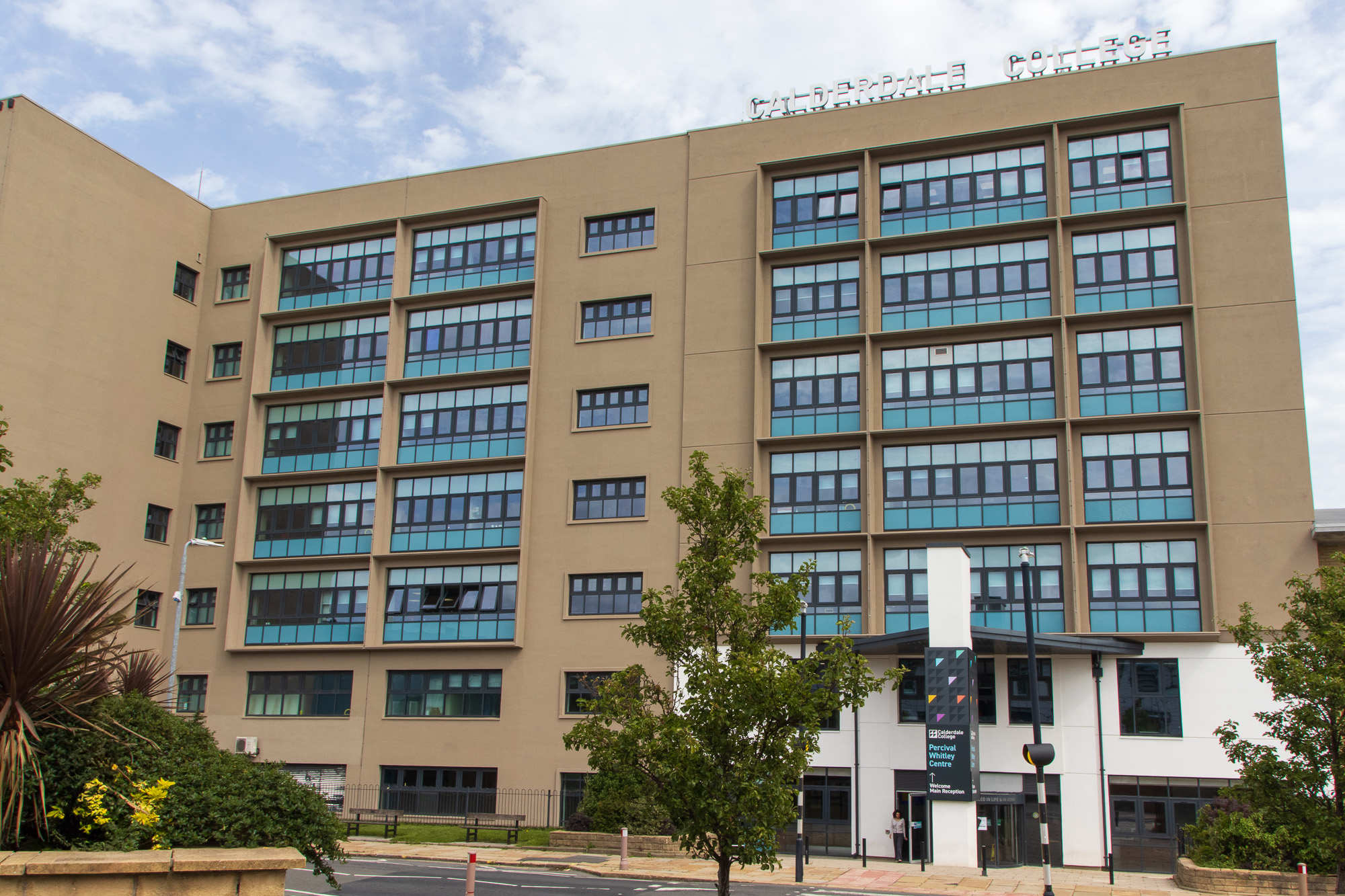
- Main building (also called the Percival Whitley Centre)

Location
- Francis Street; Halifax, West Yorkshire, HX1 3UZ; England
- Coordinates: 53.72049°N 1.87446°W

Information
- Website: http://www.calderdale.ac.uk/

Calderdale College is a further and higher education college based in Halifax, West Yorkshire, England.

The college is the largest provider of further education (post-16) courses and work-based learning (apprenticeships) and—through University Centre Calderdale as part of a cooperation with Leeds Beckett University that began in 2006—the sole provider of higher education awards in the metropolitan borough of Calderdale.

== History ==
Calderdale College is descended from Halifax Technical College, which formed from the Halifax Mechanics Institute (founded 1825) and the Halifax School of Art, Queens Road (founded 1859). Construction work for Halifax Technical College began in 1893 and teaching in 1896 with one laboratory, a weaving shed and classrooms. There were 1000 students, 23 part-time teachers and one full-time teacher. The college offered courses in textiles, engineering, chemistry, commerce and ‘women’s work’. Halifax Technical College war renamed to Percival Whitley College in 1957 and eventually to Calderdale College in 1988.
