= Emeléus =

Emeléus and Emeleus are related surnames. People with those names include:

- Harry Julius Emeléus (1903-1993), British inorganic chemist, brother of Karl George Emeléus
- Henry Emeleus (1930-2017), British igneous petrologist, son of Karl George Emeléus
- Karl George Emeléus (1901–1989), experimental physicist, father of Henry, brother of Harry Julius
