= Doug Waterhouse =

Australian entomologist (1916–2000)

Dr Douglas Frew Waterhouse CMG AO ForMemRS (3 June 1916 – 1 December 2000) was an Australian entomologist. He was the son of Eben Gowrie Waterhouse. His uncle Gustavus Athol Waterhouse was also an entomologist.

Waterhouse was the chief of the CSIRO entomology division from 1960 to 1981. He is best known for the invention of the active ingredient in Aerogard, an Australian insect repellent. He also gave his consent to the Australian Dung Beetle Project (1965-1985) which saw the introduction of dung beetles to Australia as a fly control measure. While this was a risky decision because of the threat that the dung beetles could themselves become pests or disrupt the delicate ecological balance, it proved very successful and reduced the population of bush flies by 90%.

Dr Waterhouse was a key person involved in the establishment of CSIRO Australian National Insect Collection which was created in 1962 to develop a systematic and comprehensive understanding of Australia's insect biodiversity.
