= John Anderson, FRS =

John Anderson, FRS may refer to any of three scientists who were Fellows of the Royal Society:

- John H. D. Anderson (1726–1796), Scottish natural philosopher and educator, founder of Strathclyde University
- Sir John Anderson (zoologist) (1833–1900), Scottish, first curator of the Indian Museum in Calcutta
- John Stuart Anderson (1908–1990), British inorganic chemist who also worked in Australia

== Note ==
John Anderson, 1st Viscount Waverley (1882–1958), British civil servant and politician, was an honorary Fellow of the Royal Society but did not use 'FRS' after his name

== See also ==
John Anderson (disambiguation)
