= Henry Emeleus =

British igneous petrologist

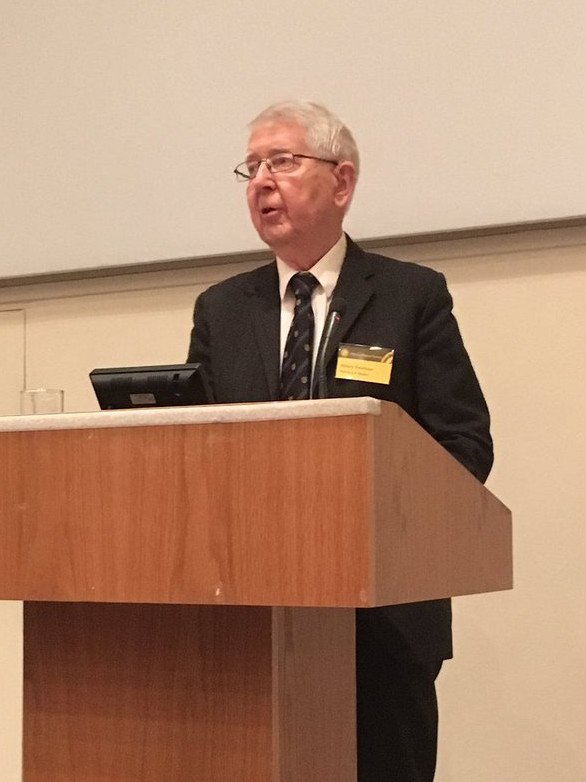
- Emeleus at Burlington House in 2016
- Born: September 4, 1930; Belfast
- Died: 11 November 2017 (aged 87); Durham, England
- Education: Queen's University Belfast; Wadham College, University of Oxford
- Awards: Prestwich Medal (2016); Collins Medal (2010)
- Scientific career
- Fields: Geology, Volcanology, Mineralogy, Petrology
- Workplaces: University of Durham
- Doctoral advisor: Bill Wager
- Doctoral students: Ian Parsons
- Other notable students: Marjorie Wilson

Charles Henry Emeleus (4 September 1930 – 11 November 2017) was a British igneous petrologist. He specialized in the Paleogene volcanic rocks of Britain and Greenland.

== Personal life ==
Henry Emeleus was born in Belfast in 1930. He was the son of physicist Karl George Emeléus, a lecturer (and later professor) at Queen's University Belfast, and nephew of chemist Harry Julius Emeléus.

Emeleus died on 11 November 2017 in Durham, UK.

== Research ==
Emeleus studied geology at Queen's University Belfast (BSc 1952.MSc 1953) and then went to work with Bill Wager at Oxford, where he was a student at Wadham College. He completed his doctorate there in 1957. During this period, he was introduced to the layered igneous rocks of Greenland and Rùm, where he initially worked with George Malcolm Brown.

In addition to his teaching and research into igneous rocks, Emeleus was a highly capable petrologist. The mineral emeleusite, a colorless sodium silicate, is named after him.

== Awards ==
- Prestwich Medal of the Geological Society of London, 2016
- Collins Medal of the Mineralogical Society of Great Britain and Ireland, 2010. Quote from VMSG Newsletter: "Henry Emeleus received the Collins Medal for an outstanding contribution to pure and applied aspects of Mineral Sciences and associated studies during a long and active career."
- Clough Medal of the Edinburgh Geological Society, 1994.
- Chancellor's Medal of the University of Durham, 2014.
