= Karl George Emeléus =

English experimental physicist

- Born: August 4, 1901; London, England
- Died: June 18, 1989 (aged 87); Belfast, Northern Ireland
- Education: St John's College, Cambridge
- Spouse: Florence Mary Chambers
- Scientific career
- Fields: Conduction of electricity through gases
- Workplaces: King's College London; St John's College, Cambridge; Queen's University Belfast
- Thesis: Methods for detecting single ionizing particles (1926)
- Doctoral advisor: Edward Appleton

Karl George Emeléus (4 August 1901 in London–18 June 1989 in Belfast) was an English experimental physicist who spent half a century on the staff at Queen's University Belfast. His early research in detection of nuclear radiation led on to a lifetime of research into the conduction of electricity through gases.

== Biography ==
Emeléus was the son of Karl Henry Emeléus and Ellen Briggs, the brother of inorganic chemist Harry Julius Emeléus and the father of petrologist Henry Emeleus. In 1928 he married Florence Mary Chambers, daughter of one of the founders of Chambers Motors, and they had four children – three sons and one daughter. As a direct consequence of the marriage Florence was forced to give up her job as Junior Lecturer in physics at Queen's University Belfast. He was known professionally as K. G. Emeléus or simply KGE, and by family and friends as George.

== Education ==
Emeléus was educated at Hastings Grammar School and at St John's College, Cambridge and was awarded a BA in 1922. Upon graduation, he joined the Cavendish Laboratory where he worked as a research student under Ernest Rutherford, James Chadwick and Edward Appleton, though Rutherford's involvement was very limited. Working with Chadwick he built a large Wilson cloud chamber; this led to his lifelong interest in gaseous electronics.

Working with Appleton and another PhD student Miles Barnett, Emeléus investigated the maximum count rate of the Geiger counter. He followed Appleton to King's College London at the beginning of 1925 to take up a role as a demonstrator in physics and completed his thesis on "Methods for detecting single ionizing particles", for which Cambridge awarded him a PhD in 1926.

== Career ==
In 1927, he joined Queen's University Belfast (QUB) as a lecturer in Physics and later became Professor of Physics (1933–66).

Early in his career he wrote the book The Conduction of Electricity Through Gases. Electronics grew out of this sort of work in the early 20th century. During his long tenure at QUB he researched extensively into the conduction of electricity through gases, publishing more than 170 papers, with his last paper being submitted less than three weeks before his death. After the Second World War he advised local government in Northern Ireland on nuclear policy, both with respect to the possibility of a nuclear attack on the province and the possibility of a nuclear power station.

== Books ==
- The Conduction of Electricity Through Gases (Methuen, 1929, second edition 1936, third edition 1951)
- Discharges in Electronegative Gases, Taylor & Francis Ltd (Jan 01, 1970), ISBN 0850660351

== Awards ==
He was awarded the title Commander of the British Empire in 1965 and was a member of the Royal Irish Academy. The Karl George Emeléus physics prize was established in 1984 by former students and friends for physics students at QUB.
