= Yingjie Jay Guo =

- Education: Xian Jiaotong University
- Scientific career
- Fields: [[Electromagnetics] [Antennas] [Wireless Communications]]
- Workplaces: University of Technology Sydney

Yingjie Jay Guo is a research scientist and an technology innovator in Australia, specialising in antennas, wireless communications and sensing research. He is a Fellow of the Australian Academy of Technological Sciences and Engineering (ATSE) and Fellow of IEEE. He is a Distinguished Professor and the director of Global Big Data Technology Centre at the University of Technology Sydney, and the Technical Director of NSW Connectivity Innovation Network . He served as the director of the Wireless Technologies Laboratory at the Commonwealth Scientific and Industrial Research Organisation. He is a recipient of Australia Engineering Innovation Award (2012), Australia Engineering Excellence Award (2007), and CSIRO Chairman's Medal (2007 and 2012). He has a BSc (1982) and master's degree (1984) from Xidian University, and a PhD (1987) from Xian Jiaotong University. He is the author of over 700 research papers and patents . He was named one of the most influential engineers in Australia by Engineers Australia in 2014 and 2015, and Australia’s national research field leader in electromagnetism in 2020, 2021, 2022 and 2023 by the Australian Research Awards (subscription required). In 2023, he received the prestigious IEEE APS 2023 Sergei A. Schelkunoff Transactions Prize Paper Award. This is arguably the highest honour of the best journal paper award bestowed by the international research community.

== Books ==
- 2002 - Fresnel Zone Antennas, with Stephen K. Barton
- 2004 - Advances in Mobile Radio Access Networks
- 2009 - Ground-Based Radio Positioning, with Kegen Yu and Ian Sharp
- 2021 - Advanced Antenna Array Engineering for 6G and Beyond Wireless Communications, with Richard W. Ziolkowski
- 2022 - Antenna and Array Technologies for Future Wireless Ecosystems, with Richard W. Ziolkowski
