= Aerogard =

Brand of insect repellant

Aerogard is an Australian brand of outdoor insect repellent that is applied directly to the skin. It comes in aerosol sprays, bottled creams and roll-ons, the manufacturer is owned by the Anglo-Dutch company Reckitt Benckiser.

== Active ingredient ==
The active ingredient in Aerogard is N, N-diethyl-meta-toluamide (DEET). Recent low-odour formulas use picaridin.

== History ==
An insect repellent developed by Australia's Commonwealth Scientific and Industrial Research Organisation (CSIRO)'s Doug Waterhouse made the 1963 visit of Elizabeth II to Australia more pleasant. Although the Queen was meant to be sprayed with the repellent at a garden party held at Government House in Canberra, the aide responsible lost his nerve. The next day Government House staff made sure the Queen was sprayed. Journalists following the Queen noted the absence of flies around the official party, and word about CSIRO's new fly-repellent spread.

A few days later Mortein called Doug Waterhouse for his formula, which he gave, as was CSIRO's policy at the time.
