= Frederick Kenneth McTaggart =

Australian scientist pioneering research in plasma chemistry

Ken McTaggart
- McTaggart c. 1966
- Born: Frederick Kenneth McTaggart; 30 November 1917; Elsternwick, Victoria, Australia
- Died: 24 March 2004 (aged 86); Melbourne, Australia
- Education: Melbourne High School, Melbourne
- Alma mater: University of Melbourne
- Known for: Application of microwave energy in inorganic chemistry
- Awards: University of Melbourne's Grosvenor Laboratories Prize for 1946; Grimwade prize in industrial research for 1946
- Scientific career
- Fields: Plasma science, Inorganic chemistry
- Workplaces: Senior Principal Research Scientist CSIRO

Frederick Kenneth McTaggart (30 November 1917 – 24 March 2004) was an Australian inorganic chemist who led pioneering research in microwave chemistry and gas plasma reactions – the production and use of ionised gas –and its applications in electronics, thermal coatings, treatment of polymers, and plasma metallurgy.

McTaggart invented and patented for the Commonwealth Scientific and Industrial Research Organisation means of incorporating heat-resistant properties in paint, and novel apparatuses for the production of metals from halides using plasma jets or microwaves, and published in the field.

== Early life and education ==
Though his birth was not registered until 1918, Frederick Kenneth McTaggart (known as Ken) was born on 30 November 1917 at Elsternwick, to Victorian Railways industrial chemist Cyril (1881 – 1966), and teacher Hilda Theresa McTaggart (née Daniel, 1882 – 1966), and his sole sibling was an older sister, Jean.

Due to childhood illness his primary education started late; aged eight he entered Grade 4 at Ormond State School, then he was educated from age 13 at Melbourne Boys High School 1931–1936. He joined a school debating team, and the orchestra, of which he was leader in 1934, and was elected a prefect in 1935. He was a ham radio enthusiast, and in his 3rd year at the school was involved in the Wireless Club, of which he became vice-president, and built his own set, the 'MHS Twin', when in 1934 he was issued an Amateur Radio Licence. It was an interest that he continued into adulthood and one he maintained throughout his life.

Aged 18 he commenced a Bachelor of Science in Chemistry at Melbourne University and in April 1939 was conferred Bachelor of Science in Wilson Hall, when he had already commenced a Master of Science with John Stuart Anderson working on the separation of hydrogen fluoride and zirconium for which he received 1st Class Honours in 1940. A Doctor of Science was conferred on him in 1965 by Melbourne University in recognition of his work on the chemistry of titanium and zirconium, and on reactions in low pressure discharges.

== Early career ==
In November 1940 McTaggart worked at Carbide Works at Electrona in Tasmania until mid-1941, then returned to Melbourne to live at 4 Kenilworth Gve. Glen Iris.

=== C.S.I.R. ===
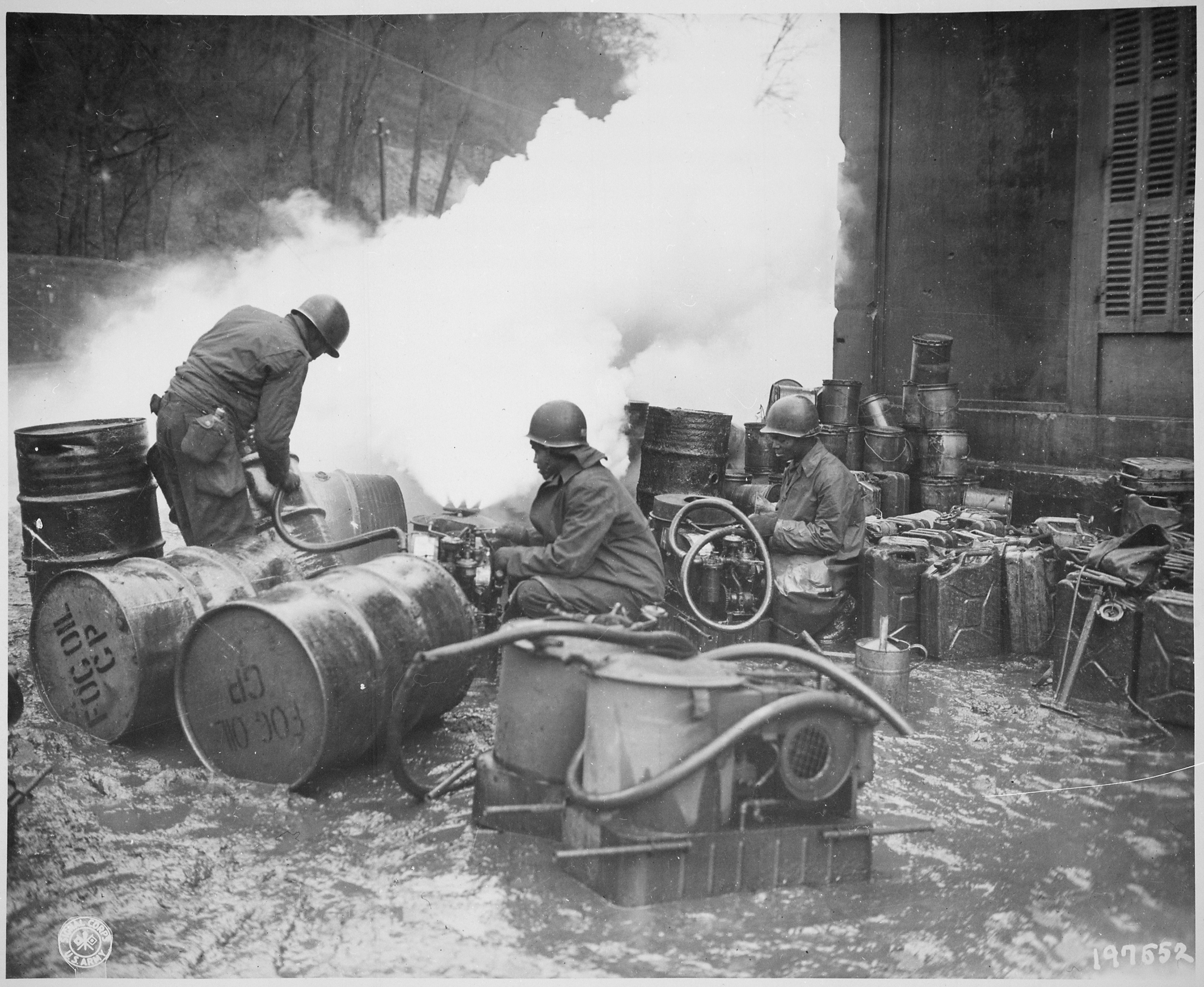
WW2: Smoke screen deployed to conceal bridge-building activity

In 1942, on the recommendation of the Council for Scientific and Industrial Research (from 1949 Commonwealth Scientific and Industrial Research Organisation, or CSIRO), McTaggart was made its employee, working at first in facilities at Melbourne University then from later that year at Fishermans Bend when a new facility was opened there. His initial investigation was the chlorination of rutile found in Australian heavy beach sands which produced titanium tetrachloride; its importance in World War II then underway, was the dense white fume it produced on exposure to moist air, making it an effective smoke screen.

McTaggart's research in his position as Senior Principal Research Scientist headed a team including (in 1946) Ian Kraitzer, Chas Alsope, Margaret Ellis, Mick Bertrand and Joy Bear; and staff qualified in electronics; Keith Perger, appointed in 1962, replaced in 1968 by John A. Hamilton; and in glassblowing; in Port Melbourne Rudi Pillig transferred to the project from the Division of Chemical Physics, before which scientists including McTaggart and Newnham in the Minerals Utilization Section were themselves skilled glassblowers, and produced their own apparatus in glass or silica.

=== Tin ===
Given an increasing wartime shortage of tin, McTaggart's team also commenced investigations into the production of titanium tetrachloride from local resources as an alternative material to replace stannic (tin) chloride in a number of applications. Previously prepared overseas by chlorinating titanium white pigment (titanium dioxide), McTaggart's work demonstrated that the potential expense of proposals to import titanium white could be avoided through development of his process in which rutile sand, briquetted with coal or charcoal, was chlorinated directly. At first operated on a pilot-plant scale with Australian rutile sand replacing titanium pigment, the process was adopted for large-scale manufacture. Briquettes of three parts rutile, one part charcoal, and 1.75 parts tar, were heated to 700 °C and chlorinated in a silicon carbide furnace tube to produce TiCl_{4} and carbon monoxide. A lead tower containing sodium carbonate solution absorbed exhaust gases. Impurities like iron chloride were separated from the titanium tetrachloride, yielding a transparent liquid, of yellow colour, indicating small amounts of silicon, sodium hypochlorite, and iron, further distilled using copper to produce highly purified, colourless titanium tetrachloride ready for industrial use.

=== Heat-resistant paint ===
Described as "one of the more imaginative members" of the Organisation, McTaggart continued mineral chlorination studies and early in 1944, Ian Kraitzer joined the research group in what was to become the Minerals Utilization Section of the future CSIR Division of Industrial Chemistry (created 1959), and then by a young recruit, Isabel Joy Bear as a Junior Laboratory Assistant, and later by Charles Alsope, together seeking new uses for titanium tetrachloride. In the alkoxides of titanium, in particular the properties of polymerised butyl titanate, they discovered an excellent vehicle for heat-resisting paint pigments; it was a use of titanium esters that was patented by CSIR, a project in which the Defence laboratories joined Kraitzer and McTaggart 's laboratory tests with paint formulation studies by Defence laboratories' George Winter (who later joined the Division of Mineral Chemistry). After McTaggart presented an account of their findings in Paris and London, industrial firms in England and the USA were soon marketing the new paint, and its heat-resistance was still attracting attention as late as 1962, though with no acknowledgment of the Australian contribution.

McTaggart and Jean Lehmann married in 1944. After the war in 1947 and during a period of residency in Europe and the USA he worked with H J Emeléus in the chemistry labs in Cambridge,

== Europe ==
In 1947 the couple departed Australia on the Stratheden, and from September lived in Mt. Pleasant Rd., Cambridge while McTaggart worked with inorganic chemist Harry Julius Emeléus' laboratory in Downing Street. He resumed his amateur radio operation with callsign G3CUA. In 1948 he worked in Paris with Yvette Cauchois on a study concerning differences in the x-ray absorption of the elements zirconium and hafnium which they published in the Comptes Rendues of the French Academy of Science When the need arose to separate the two metals for use in atomic reactors, their basic study contributed to further CSIRO investigations to devise an effective method.

While in Europe McTaggart visited Brussels, Eindhoven, Oslo and Porsgrunn before spending three months from September in the US, then in January 1949 returned to Australia from Vancouver on the Aorangi, to continue work at CSIRO while living in Box Hill. Daughter Jennifer was born 8 August 1950 and in December McTaggart left CSIRO, sailing with his family on the Himalaya for employment in the UK with the British company, Laporte Industries in Luton where his work found commercial potential, and during which time he made further trips, by car, through Europe before rejoining CSIRO at the end of 1952.

== Plasma investigations ==
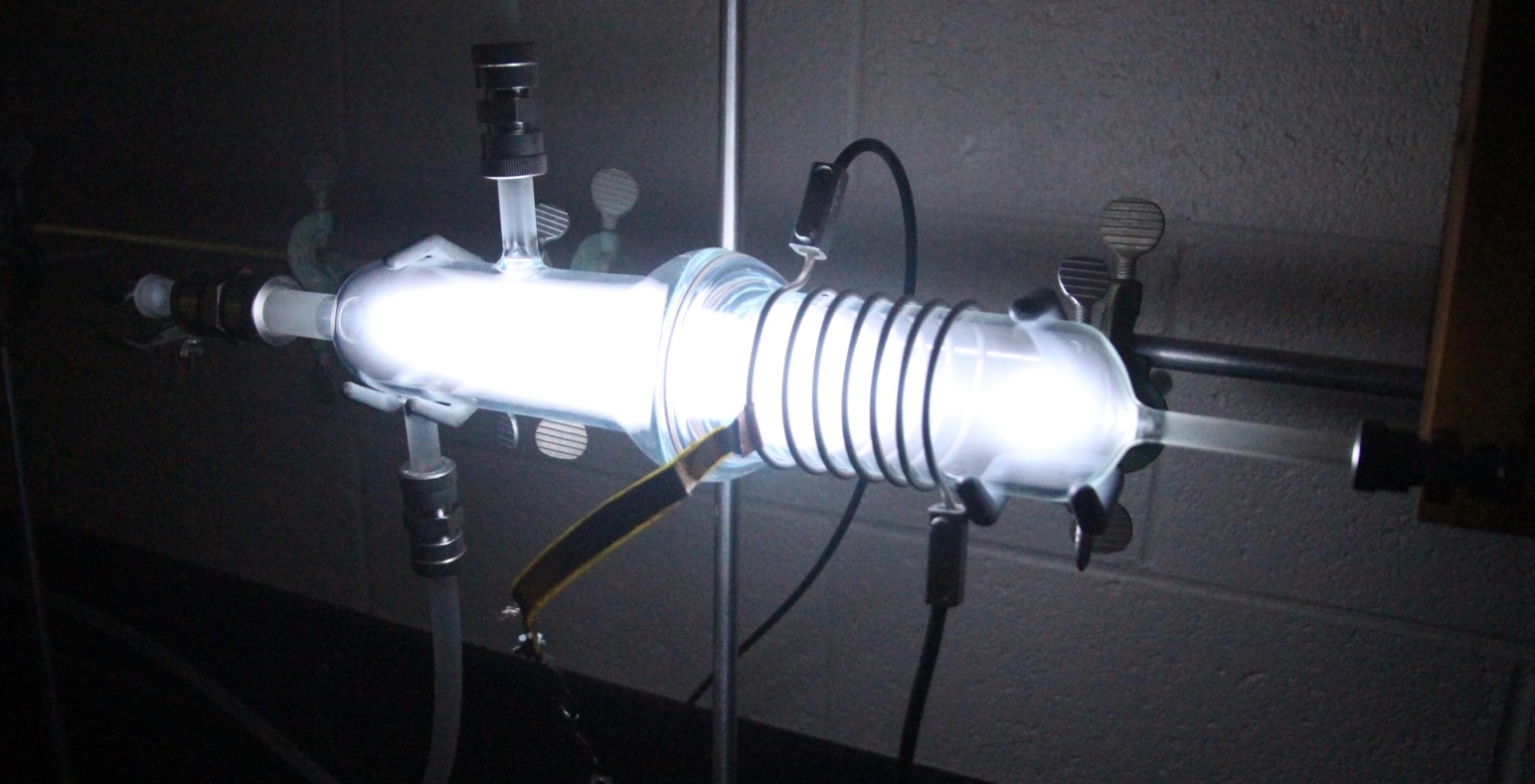
Plasma chamber in current day laboratory

During the 1950s, McTaggart made an extensive investigation of the sulfides, selenides and tellurides (collectively known as chalcogenides) of titanium, zirconium, hafnium and thorium. The study synthesised and examined some fifty different compounds, collecting data on them which was published in Australian Journal of Chemistry in 1958, and investigated their preparation and the characteristics of their chemical, electrical and lubrication properties, resulting in a process for producing titanium sulfide-based dry lubricants for high temperatures which was patented.

Pioneering studies in microwave chemistry and gas plasma reactions led from this work into the electrical resistance and conduction of the sulphides, selenides, and tellurides, supported by his development of novel experimental apparatuses. Rather than use the glow discharge generated between two electrodes to produce a plasma reaction as Newnham and Watts had done, in the late 50s McTaggart drew on technology derived from the wartime electronics of radar capable of frequencies in the microwave region of the radio spectrum to create discharges without using electrodes. He induced the plasma with these charges into the gas through coils wound around the reaction vessel, thus avoiding contamination by metal from electrodes. In his monograph, McTaggart sums up the achievement: "Instead of an arc between electrodes, a radio-frequency field may be used to maintain the plasma."

This approach, using high frequency discharges led to the discovery of new chemical reactions in low pressure plasmas, verified by a mass spectrometer built in the Division to identify the active species involved in the reactions. Research continued along two main avenues; low pressure, athermal plasmas, with high electron energies producing neutral atoms, ions, etc., at ambient or low temperature, with applications in the areas of pure research, chemical analysis, surface preparation, and thin film production; and atmospheric or high pressure plasmas, previously achieved with electrodes producing a plasma 'jet' or 'torch', and used in parallel to McTaggart's microwave technique, for the production of high temperature, which best suited the interests of the Division in minerals.

== International recognition ==
McTaggart spent four months in 1962 on a working tour through the US, Buenos Aires and England. In 1963 he assembled and presented his papers for an honorary doctorate, which was granted in 1965, during which year he again traveled in Europe and presented in Belgrade at the VIIth International Conference on Phenomena in Ionized Gases, and commenced his monograph on plasma chemistry which he completed the following year.

In April 1967, he was invited by the United States Air Force to the American Chemical Society Conference at Miami, Florida, then addressed the Institution of Mining and Metallurgy Conference in London. In September the English edition of his monograph was published.

On the basis of his work in plasma chemistry, during July and August 1971, McTaggart was sponsored for a tour of the United States by its Office of Naval Research, to be flown by the US Airforce to the NASA-Ames Base to participate in a seminar on plasma chemistry. In Washington D.C. he presented the inaugural lecture at the IUPAC (International Union of Pure and Applied Chemistry) Conference on Plasma Chemistry, which appointed him a member of its steering committee. Following that, he lectured at the Gordon Research Conference on Plasma Chemistry, held at Beaver Dam.

== Late career ==
McTaggart transferred his research activities to the University of Sydney from November 1973 and retired in February 1978, after which he returned to Melbourne.

== Patents ==
McTaggart's plasma research led to patents as assignor to the CSIRO, including US 3,533,777 Production of metals from their halides filed 2 Nov. 1966 for an apparatus and process for producing metals from the halides of metals of Groups I, II, III of the Periodic table and rare earth metals. It consisted of means to generate a plasma through high frequency electromagnetic energy within a gas or a vapor of that halide to cause the halide to dissociate, and then separating the metal thus produced from the other dissociation products, a process in which an auxiliary gas, hydrogen, helium or nitrogen, may also be used in conjunction with the halide.

He filed another patent on 5 Sept. 1967 for Plasma sintering with Neil Mckinnon, C.E.G. Bennet and Lloyd S. Williams, which was issued 11 March 1969.

== Author ==
Aside from his oft-cited Plasma chemistry in electrical discharges published 1967 in 16 editions in 4 languages, McTaggart was author or co-author on a number of papers in journals including Australian Journal of Chemistry, Nature, and the Journal of Applied Chemistry on experimental research into its physics and chemistry and its applications.

== Memberships ==
McTaggart was a member of the Society of Crystallographers in Australia (SCA).

== Awards ==
For his work in applied chemical science on rutile sand, phosphate rock, graphite and beryl "which has contributed to the advancement of the welfare of the community", McTaggart was awarded the University of Melbourne's Grosvenor Laboratories Prize for 1946 by the Royal Australian Chemical Institute; and the Grimwade prize in industrial research for 1946 for his "Mineral Chlorination Studies." He was among the first CSIRO officers to be awarded an honorary doctorate.

== Personal life ==
McTaggart was named after his uncle, Frederick Daniel, who was at the time in the Mining Corp in France. His family moved to Ormond in about 1920 and Ken was home schooled by his mother, Hilda, a trained teacher. His late enrolment in primary school aged 8 was due to chronic bronchitis during his early childhood, but it gave way to robust health for the major part of his life.

With a keen interest in radio, McTaggart was granted his first Amateur Radio license in 1934 as VK3NW which remained his call sign, aside from during WW2 when no amateur radio transmission was allowed, and later during his period living in Sydney in the 1970s.

Ken was 13 when his mother arranged for him to attend Melbourne Boys High School arguing that his academic capacity warranted his admission, verified by his subsequent excellent academic achievements. He was made a prefect in his 2nd year of 6th Form, while preparing for admission to Melbourne University. He moved to Malvern for a brief period prior to employment in Tasmania.

When in 1941 McTaggart joined CSIRO and worked at both the Head Office and at Melbourne University, his family moved to Glen Iris. That year McTaggart played in the Melbourne Conservatorium Orchestra where he met Jean Lehmann to whom he was engaged the following year after her recovery from TB at Heatherton Sanatorium. McTaggart converted his first car to gas burning so that he could visit her there and journey to work at the Fisherman's Bend laboratories of CSIRO. They married in January 1944 and lived in Kew until 1947 when they travelled to Cambridge, UK, Paris and the USA. Regaining his radio license in 1946, in the UK he used the call sign G3CUA.

In early 1949, the couple returned to Australia after three months in the US and lived in Box Hill. Daughter Jennifer was born August 1950 and a few weeks later, the family moved to Luton, UK, where he was employed by Laporte. A number of trips to Europe, made this a busy time for the family, before a return to Australia late in 1952 when McTaggart was re-appointed to the Mineral Chemistry Division of CSIRO at Fisherman's Bend.

In 1953, the family bought their first home in Camberwell. In April 1954 son Stephen was born and in 1958 the family moved to a larger home in East Hawthorn. Over the next decade, McTaggart travelled extensively in the US, South America and the UK publishing prolifically, for which research he received an Honorary Doctorate in 1965, the year in which he travelled in Russia and France, and to Sweden where he was a member of the Australian archery team at the World Archery Championships, then the US, Canada, Japan and New Zealand. His interest in archery started in the early 1960s and he belonged to the Kew Archery club.

In 1970, Ken and Jean separated and he lived for a time in a St Kilda flat and in his shack at Woori Yallock before moving to Sydney and working at Sydney University in 1973. With longstanding friend Donald Westlake, principal Clarinet player in the Sydney Symphony Orchestra, he sailed from Sydney to Hobart in 1973, and later back to Sydney. He met his second wife, Betty Lewis, that year and they married in 1974, living in her home in Killara.

In 1975, McTaggart again travelled extensively overseas before retiring early in 1978. Later that year he separated from Betty and moved back to Box Hill in Melbourne. His granddaughter, Caitlyn, was born in July 1980 and McTaggart, being devoted to her, shared his time between Mount Gambier where she and her mother Jennifer lived, and Box Hill, living there with son Stephen, before moving to Mount Gambier on a more permanent basis in the early 1980s, then moved with Jennifer and Caitlyn to Hamilton in 1989, returning to live with Stephen in 1992 in Box Hill South.

He was a long-time member of the Brontë Society in the United Kingdom and maintained an interest in radio, classical music, and ballet, which he introduced to his granddaughter Caitlyn. He also shared his daughter’s interest in border collies. His recreational activities included cricket, golf, archery, tennis, camping, and fishing in the rivers around Marysville.

== Publications ==
=== Book ===
- McTaggart, F. K. (Frederick Kenneth) (1967), Robinson, P. L. (ed.), Plasma chemistry in electrical discharges, London: Elsevier

=== Articles ===
- McTaggart, F. K. (1945). "Mineral chlorination studies. 1. Production of titanium tetrachloride from Australian rutile sand". Journal of the Council for Scientific and Industrial Research. 18 (1): 5–26. hdl:102.100.100/338864.
- Kraitzer, I. McTaggartr, K. and Winter, G. (1948). Esters of Titanium. Journal of Oil and Colour Chemists Association, 31, 4 0 5 -17.
- McTaggart, F.K. (1945). Mineral Chlorination Studies. 1. Production of Titanium Tetrachloride from Australian Rutile Sand. Journal of lhe Council for Scienlific and Industrial Research, 18(1), 5 -26.
- McTaggart, F.K. (1945b). Mineral Chlorination Studies. 2. The Production of Phosphorus Oxychloride by Direct Chlorination of Phosphate Rock. Journal of the Council for Scientific and Industrial Research, 18(4), 424 -32.
- McTaggart, F.K. (1947). Mineral Chlorination Studies. 3. The Chlorination of Australian Beryl. Journal of the Council for Scientific and Industrial Research, 20(4), 5 6 5-84
- McTaggart, F.K. (1947). Mineral Chlorination Studies. 4. The Beneficiation of Australian Graphite by Treatment with Chlorine at High Temperatures. Journal of the Council for Scientific and Industrial Research, 20(3), 1 -10.
- Cauchols Y. et McTaggart K. (1949) 'Doslmétrle par absorption dl!férentlelle des rayons X, à l'aide de spectromètres à cristaux courbés et de computeurs de Geiger.' Extrait des Comptes rendus des séances de l'Académie des Sciences, séance du 21 mars 1949. C.R. 228:1003
- McTaggart, F.K. Systematic chemistry of the transition elements - recent chemistry of titanium, zirconium and hafnium. Reviews in Pure and Applied Chemistry. 1951. 152–170. http://hdl.handle.net/102.100.100/337739?index=1
- McTaggart, F.K. and Newnham, I.E. (1951). The Use of Radioactive Tracers in the Separation of Hafnium and Zirconium. Conference on Applications of Isotopes in Scientific Research, Melbourne, 1950, 1 6 7 -74.
- McTaggart, F.K. and Bear, J. (1955), Phototropic effects in oxides. I. Titanium dioxide. J. Appl. Chem., 5: 643–653. https://doi.org/10.1002/jctb.5010051203
- McTaggart, F.K. (1956). Australian Patent 205,568
- Bear, J., & McTaggart, F. K. (1958). Phototropic effects in oxides. II. White oxides in general. Journal of Applied Chemistry, 8(1), 72–76.
- McTaggart, F. K., & Wadsley, A. D. (1958). The sulphides, selenides, and tellurides of titanium, zirconium, hafnium, and thorium. I. Preparation and characterization. Australian Journal of Chemistry, 11(4), 445–457.
- McTaggart, F. K., & Moore, A. (1958). The sulphides, Selenides, and Tellurides of Titanium, Zirconium, Hafnium, and Thorium. IV. Lubrication properties of the graphitic chalcogenides. Australian Journal of Chemistry, 11(4), 481–484.
- Blackwood, J. D., & McTaggart, F. K. (1959). Reactions of carbon with atomic gases. Australian Journal of Chemistry, 12(4), 533–542.
- Blackwood, J.D. and, F.K. (1959b). A New Approach to Carbon Gasification. Nature, 184, 447–8.
- Blackwood, J. D., & McTaggart, F. K. (1959). The oxidation of carbon with atomic oxygen. Australian Journal of Chemistry, 12(2), 114–121.
- Graham, J., & McTaggart, F. K. (1960). Observations on the systems Th-S, Th-Se and Th-Te. Australian Journal of Chemistry, 13(1), 67–73.
- McTaggart, F. K. (1961). Reduction of zirconium and hafnium Oxides. Nature, 191(4794), 1192-1192.
- McTaggart FK, New proton-Containing Oxides of Titanium, Zirconium and Hafnium. Nature 199, 339–341 (1963). https://doi.org/10.1038/199339a0
- McTaggart FK Turnbull AG (1964) Zirconium difluoride. Australian Journal of Chemistry 17, 727-730. https://doi.org/10.1071/CH9640727
- McTaggart FK (1964) Reactions of carbon monoxide in a high-frequency discharge. Australian Journal of Chemistry 17, 1182–1187. https://doi.org/10.1071/CH9641182
- McTaggart, F. K. (1964). Reduction of silica in a hydrogen discharge. Nature, 201(4926), 1320–1321.
- McTaggart, F. K., & Turnbull, A. G. (1964). Zirconium difluoride. Australian Journal of Chemistry, 17(7), 727-730
- McTaggart, F.K. (1965). Reduction of the Alkali and Alkaline Halides in High Frequency Discharges, Part I - Hydrogen Discharge; Part II - The Role of Electrons. Australian Journal of Chemistry, 18(7) 9 3 7-48; 9 4 9-57.
- McTaggart F.K, Reduction of the Alkali and Alkaline Earth Halides by Active Hydrogen. Nature 206, 616 (1965). https://doi.org/10.1038/206616a0
- Black, A. L., Dunster, R. W., Sanders, J. V., & McTaggart, F. K. (1967). Molybdenum bisulphide deposits—their formation and characteristics on automotive engine parts. Wear, 10(1), 17–32.
- McTaggart, F. K. (1965). Reduction of the alkali and alkaline earth halides in high-frequency discharges. I. Hydrogen discharge. Australian Journal of Chemistry, 18(7), 937–948.
- McTaggart, F.K. (1967). Formation of Metals from Their Halides by Plasma Reactions. Proceedings of the Symposium, Advances in Extractive Metallurgy (London). (Institution of Mining and Metallurgy: London.)
- McTaggart, F.K. (1969). The Dissociation of Metal Halides in Electrical Discharges. In Chemical Reactions in Electrical Discharges. Advances in Chemistry Series No. 80, 176-81 (American Chemical Society: Eton, Pa.).
- McIntyre, R.J. and McTaggart F.K. (1970). Comparison of the Reactions of Atomic and Molecular Halogens with Silver. Journal of Physical Chemistry, 74, 866–74.
- Dorman, F. H., & McTaggart, F. K. (1970). Absorption of microwave power by plasmas. Journal of Microwave Power, 5(1), 4-16.
- Chandler, B. V., & McTaggart, F. K. (1971). Fluorine atoms from an RF electric discharge. Australian Journal of Chemistry, 24(12), 2683–2684.
- Dorman, F.H. and F.K. (1972). Electron Density and Temperature in Microwave Plasmas at Higher Pressures. Journal of Microwave Power, 7(3), 1 8 1 - 4
