= George Bornemissza =

Hungarian–Australian entomologist

George Bornemissza OAM
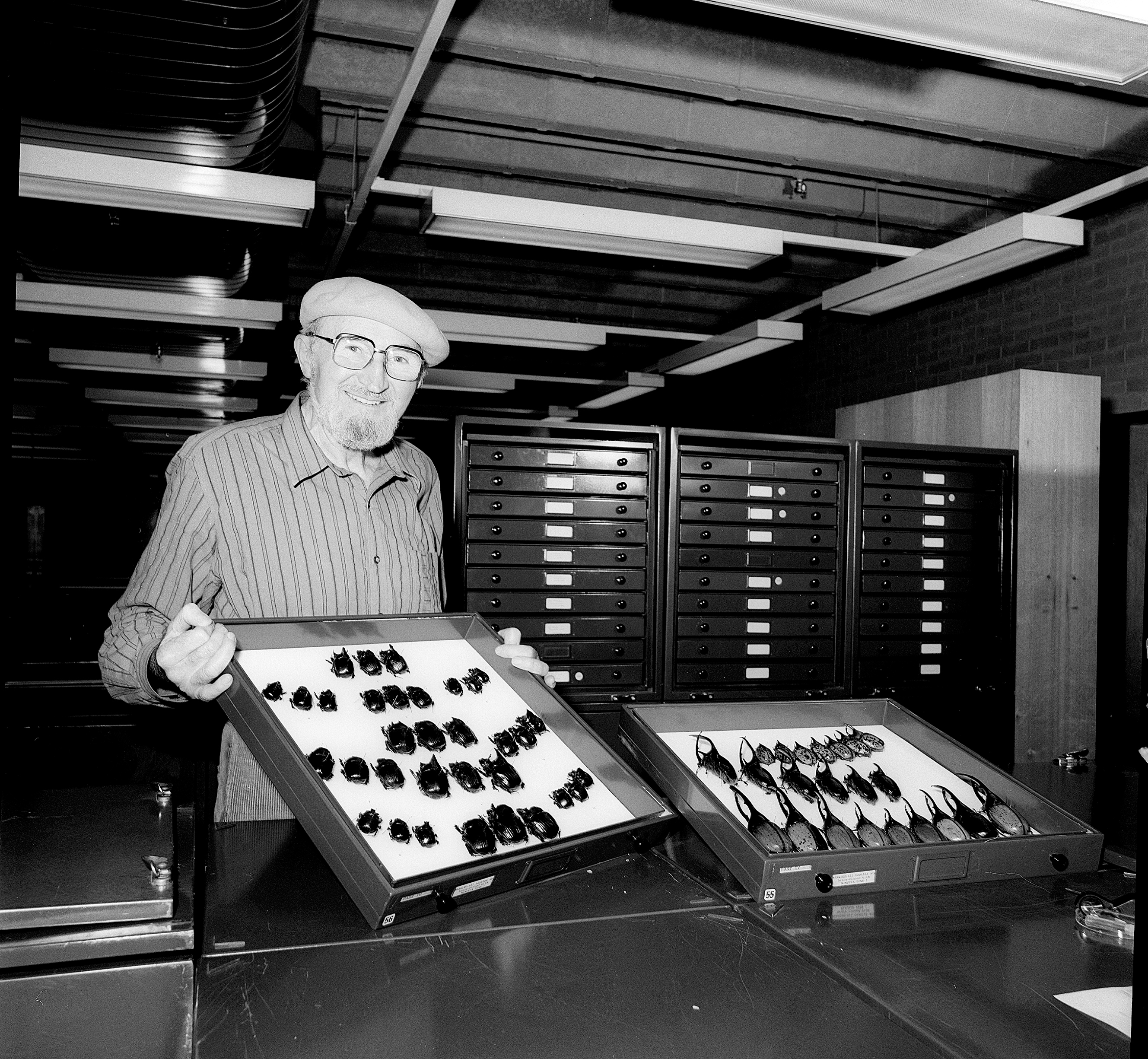
- George Bornemissza
- Born: György Ferenc Bornemissza; 11 January 1924; Baja, Hungary
- Died: 10 April 2014 (aged 90); Australia
- Education: University of Innsbruck
- Known for: The Australian Dung Beetle Project
- Awards: Medal of the Order of Australia 2001
- Scientific career
- Fields: Entomology, Biology, Ecology, Agricultural Science
- Workplaces: University of Western Australia, Commonwealth Scientific and Industrial Research Organisation, University of Tasmania

George Francis Bornemissza OAM (born György Ferenc Bornemissza; 11 February 1924 – 10 April 2014) was a Hungarian-born entomologist and ecologist. He studied science at the University of Budapest before obtaining his Ph.D. in zoology at the University of Innsbruck in Austria in 1950. At the end of that year, he emigrated to Australia. There he first worked in the Department of Zoology at the University of Western Australia for three years, before pursuing a career with the Commonwealth Scientific and Industrial Research Organisation (CSIRO). Bornemissza was known for his work on the Australian Dung Beetle Project (1965–1985) while working at CSIRO's Division of Entomology. He wrote scientific papers and books based on his research and contributed a collection of mounted beetle specimens to the Australian National Insect Collection and the Tasmanian Museum and Art Gallery. In 2001 he was awarded the Medal of the Order of Australia for his services to Australian entomology.

== Early life and education ==
Bornemissza was born in Baja, Hungary, to Katalin Bornemissza and Ferenc Bornemissza, an engineer. He began collecting and studying beetles in the forests around his hometown during his mid-teens and also volunteered in museums and scientific institutions in Budapest.

== Career and research ==
=== Early career ===
After receiving his doctorate from the University of Innsbruck in Austria, Bornemissza fled central Europe to escape the post-World War II Soviet regimes and traveled to Western Australia, where he arrived on 31 December 1950. Six months after arriving on Australian shores, while working with the Department of Zoology at the University of Western Australia, he remarked upon a large number of old, dry cow dung pads that covered cattle grazing fields near Wooroloo, Western Australia and compared this to the relatively dung-free cattle fields of his native Hungary. In Hungary and elsewhere in the world, dung beetles have adapted to be able to roll and bury large, moist cattle dung pads but native Australian beetles, which co-evolved alongside the marsupials, were not able to utilize bovine dung since cattle were only relatively recently introduced to Australia in the 1880s. Bornemissza hypothesized that the introduction of foreign dung beetle species that were able to roll and bury cattle dung pads would aid not only Australia's soil fertility by recycling the dung nutrients back into the ground, but would also reduce the number of pestilent flies and parasitic worms which use the dung pads as a breeding ground. Bornemissza joined CSIRO in 1955 and continued to advocate for the introduction of bovine dung beetles to Australia whilst working on several other projects and studies. The Australian Dung Beetle Project subsequently secured funding from the Australian Meat Research Committee and commenced in 1965.

Beyond his work in entomology, during the 1950s and 1960s, Dr. Bornemissza was also a keen amateur filmmaker. In 1962 he won the Kodak Trophy for the 8mm Best Australian Entry at the Australian Amateur Cine Society 23rd International Gold Cup Competition for his entry "The Burning Bush", a documentary on the effect of bushfires on Australian ecosystems that made extensive use of time lapse photography.

=== The Australian Dung Beetle Project 1965–1985 ===
From 1965, Bornemissza traveled extensively in search of suitable dung beetles to introduce to Australia. The first dung beetles to be introduced to Australia came from Hawaii, where beetles had already been introduced from Africa to biologically control populations of the pestilent horn fly. Samples of the species Onthophagus gazella were transported to Australia where they were bred in sterile conditions before being released in Queensland in 1968. After the introduction, they became established across a large area of tropical Australia.

It was realized that due to periods of seasonal inactivity by O. gazella, further beetle species were needed to fill in the gaps in climatic and habitat preference and the peak time of beetle activity. To this end, Bornemissza traveled to Pretoria in 1970 where he helped establish a South African branch of the Australian Dung Beetle Research Unit. For nine years, he carried out research to find species of dung beetle that would not only be able to remove the bovine dung pads in Australia, but would thrive in the varying climates found all over the continent. It was also important that the chosen beetles, and the tiny parasites that the beetles carry, would not themselves become pests and so, strict quarantining procedures were devised and developed. In total, 43 species of beetle from Africa and Europe were introduced to Australia by CSIRO between 1968 and 1984.

=== Project outcomes and impact ===
The funding for the Australian Dung Beetle Project was withdrawn in 1985 after the restructuring of the Australian Meat Research Committee, but Bornemissza believed that the full potential of the project had yet to be realized. He said, "The introduction of exotic dung beetles and their subsequent establishment in Australia is now history and a very successful one at that. However, it fell short in filling all the climatic areas with their vast variety of habitats". This last statement was made in a report by Penny Edwards in 2007, which summarised investigations made by Landcare Australia to evaluate the distribution and abundance of introduced species of dung beetle across Australia. The investigation found that 23 of the 43 species of dung beetle introduced by Bornemissza and his team were still established and thriving all over Australia, and it recommended that further research be carried out to fill the empty ecological niches with new species of introduced dung beetle. The work Bornemissza and his team undertook with the Australian Dung Beetle Project is credited with being the reason why Australians today can enjoy a terrace café culture. The success of the project in reducing the number of bush flies by 90% has meant that outside dining is no longer illegal, as it once was in the 1950s. The "Australian Salute", a flick of the hand recognized by older generations of Australians as the only solution to rid oneself of flies at that time, became a dwindling gesture. The Australian Dung Beetle Project is also said to have affected soil, water, and pasture health that is "undoubtedly worth many millions of dollars a year".

=== Retirement and further work ===
Bornemissza moved to Tasmania in 1979 and formally retired in 1983 but continued to work privately to foster awareness of beetles and conservation issues. In retirement he compiled a collection of beetles for public display, which he donated to the Australian National Insect Collection in Canberra. Following this 3-year project he commenced in 1993 a 20-year private project to assemble the largest collection of beetles ever presented for public display. Entitled George Bornemissza's Forest Beauties of the Beetle World: A Tribute to Biodiversity and an Appeal for its Preservation, the collection is structured into five sections focussed on size range, allometry, color, secondary sexual dimorphism and zoogeography. As the sections were completed they were donated to the Tasmanian Museum and Art Gallery. The Bornemissza Collection of beetles was the subject of an episode of the TV show "Collectors" shown on the Australian television channel ABC in 2005.

Bornemissza also contributed to habitat conservation initiatives in Tasmania. He assessed, with Karyl Michaels, the effect of clear-felling and slash-burning of forest on lucanid beetles in Tasmania. These beetles feed on and reproduce in decaying wood and it was found that forest-clearing practices have led to a significant decrease in the distribution and abundance of several species. Some, including Bornemissza's Stag Beetle (Hoplogonus bornemisszai), are now considered endangered species, and improved forest management strategies in Tasmania are recommended.

Bornemissza died in Australia on 10 April 2014 at age 90.

== Awards and honours ==
Bornemissza received several awards including:

- Kodak Trophy for the 8mm Best Australian Entry, Australian Amateur Cine Society 23rd International Gold Cup Competition 1962
- Fellowship of the Von Humboldt Society
- Britannica Award Gold Medal, 1973, For his application of ecology for human benefit
- Rolex Award for Enterprise, 1981, honorable mention for his project Dung Beetles against Pasture Pollution
- Medal of the Order of Australia, 2001, For service to science and entomology, particularly through the ecological study of dung beetles and the introduction of new species to Australia
- CSIRO Service from Science Award, 2003, in recognition of his dedication of time and effort to improve our knowledge of our insect biodiversity
- Emeritus Fellow of Entomology, CSIRO, 2006
- Australian Geographic Conservationist of the Year 2008
- Bornemissza Crescent in Macnamara, Australian Capital Territory was named in his honour.

== Eponymy ==
Several species of beetle and other insects have been named after Bornemissza, including:

1. Carbrunneria bornemisszai Princis, 1954
2. Osa bornemisszai Paramonov 1958
3. Polypauropus bornemisszai Remy, 1961
4. Symphylella bornemisszai Scheller, 1961
5. Ipomyia bornemisszai Colless, 1965
6. Beierolpium bornemisszai Beier, 1966
7. Pseudotyrannochthonius bornemisszai Beier, 1966
8. Eosentomon bornemisszai Tuxon, 1967
9. Copris bornemisszai Ferreira, 1968 (synonym of Copris bootes Klug, 1855)
10. Neosisyphus bornemisszai Ferreira, 1968 (synonym of Neosisyphus infuscatus Klug, 1855)
11. Onthophagus bornemisszai Matthews, 1972
12. Onthophagus bornemisszanus, Matthews, 1972
13. Temnoplectron bornemisszai Matthews, 1974
14. Setoppia bornemisszai Balogh, 1982
15. Sisyphus bornemisszanus Endrödi, 1983
16. Acutozetes bornemisszai J. & P. Balogh, 1986
17. Clambus bornemisszai Endrödy-Younga, 1990
18. Hoplogonus bornemisszai Bartolozzi, 1996
19. Viracochiella bornemisszai, Balogh & Mahunka, 1996
20. Lissotes bornemisszai, Bartolozzi, 2003

== Publications ==
Bornemissza is the author or co-author of several articles in the field of entomology. His work has appeared in a range of journals and books including Nature and the Australian Journal of Zoology and was published between the years 1956 - 1999.

=== Selected publications ===
- Bornemissza, G. F. (1957), The first Projapygidae from Western Australia, with some additional notes on the family and its allies, Western Australian Nature 6:76-79
- Bornemissza, G. F. (1957), An analysis of arthropod succession in carrion and the effect of its decomposition on the soil fauna, Australian Journal of Zoology 5:1-12
- Bornemissza, G.F. (1960), Could dung-eating insects improve our pastures? Journal of the Australian Institute of Agricultural Science 26: 54-56
- Bornemissza, G. F. (1961), Termination of pupal diapause in the cinnabar moth and the reproductive capacity of the resulting females, Nature 190: 936-937
- Bornemissza, G. F. (1964), Sex attractant of male scorpion flies, Nature 203: 786-787
- Bornemissza, G. F. (1966), Specificity of male sex attractants in some Australian scorpion flies, Nature 209:732-733
- Bornemissza, G. F. (1966), An attempt to control ragwort in Australia with the cinnabar moth, Callimorpha jacobaeae (L.) (Arctiidae: Lepidoptera), Australian Journal of Zoology 14:201-243
- Bornemissza, G. F. (1966), Observations on the hunting and mating behavior of two species of scorpionflies (Bittacidae: Mecoptera), Australian Journal of Zoology 14:371-382
- Bornemissza, G. F. (1968), Studies on the histerid beetle Pachylister Chinensis in Fiji, and its possible value in the control of buffalo-fly in Australia, Australian Journal of Zoology 16:673-688
- Bornemissza, G. F. (1969), A new type of brood care observed in the dung beetle Oniticellus cinctus (Scarabaeidae), Pedobiologia 9:223-225
- Bornemissza G. F. (1970), Insectary studies on the control of dung breeding flies by the activity of the dung beetle, Onthophagus Gazella F. (Coleoptera: Scarabaeinae), Journal of the Australian Entomology Society 9:31-41
- Bornemissza, G. F. and Williams, C. H. (1970), An effect of dung beetle activity on plant yield, Pedobiologia 10:1-7
- Bornemissza, G. F. (1971), A new variant of the paracopric nesting type in the Australian dung beetle, Onthophagus composites, Pedobiologia 11:1-10
- Bornemissza, G. F. (1971), Mycetopagous breeding in the Australian dung beetle, Onthophagus dunning, Pedobiologia 11:133-142
- Bornemissza, G. F. (1976), The Australian dung beetle project 1965-1975, Australian Meat Research Committee Review 30:1-30
- Bornemissza, G. F. (1979), The Australian Dung Beetle Research Unit in Pretoria, South African Journal of Science 75 (6): 257-260
- Bornemissza, G. F. (1983), Darwin and the Tasmanian dung beetles, Tasmanian Nature 75:1-3
- Michaels, K, and Bornemissza, G. F. (1999), Effects of clear-fell harvesting on lucanid beetles (Coleoptera: Lucanidae) in wet and dry sclerophyll forests in Tasmania, Journal of Insect Conservation 3:85-95
