= John Stuart Anderson =

British and Australian scientist

John Stuart Anderson FRS, FAA, (9 January 1908 – 25 December 1990) was a British and Australian scientist who was Professor of Chemistry at the University of Melbourne and Professor of Inorganic Chemistry at the University of Oxford.

He was born in Islington, London, the son of a Scottish cabinet-maker, and attended school in the area but learned most of his chemistry at the Islington Public Library. His tertiary education was at the Northern Polytechnic Institute, Imperial College and the Royal College of Science, all in London.

Anderson's most important research work was:

- on the application of Raman spectroscopy to valence problems
- accounting for the composition ranges of non-stoichiometric compounds by combining the ideas of Schottky and Wagner with those of Fowler and Lacher
- his use of field-emission and field ion microscopy to study surface reactions at the atomic level
- his use of the electron microscope to solve problems of reaction mechanisms in solid state chemistry
- on the conditions of equilibrium of 'non-stoichiometric' chemical compounds.

In addition he carried out practical investigations on the composition of minerals mined in Australia, assisted on one project by Masters candidate Ken McTaggart who went on to be a senior research officer at CSIRO. He developed a love of the Australian bush and, with his family, a lifelong attachment to the country.

Anderson was co-author with Harry Julius Emeléus of the seminal textbook Modern Aspects of Inorganic Chemistry, first published in 1938, which went through numerous editions and translations for over thirty years.

John Stuart Anderson died from cancer in Canberra on Christmas Day, 1990.

In memory of John, the University of Melbourne created the JS Anderson Prize awarded to a promising research student in the area of Chemistry.

== Research and teaching posts ==
- 1930–1938 Demonstrator and Assistant Lecturer at Imperial College, London
- 1931 Travelling scholarship to work with Walter Hieber on metal carbonyls at the University of Heidelberg
- 1938–1947 Senior Lecturer in Inorganic Chemistry, University of Melbourne
- 1947–1954 Senior Principal and Deputy Chief Scientific Officer, Atomic Energy Research Establishment, Harwell
- 1954–1959 Professor of Chemistry at the University of Melbourne
- 1959–1963 Director of the National Chemical Laboratory, Teddington (closed 1965)
- 1963–1975 Professor of Inorganic Chemistry, University of Oxford
- 1975–1981 Honorary Professorial Fellow of University College, Aberystwyth
- 1981–1990 Visiting Fellow, Research School of Chemistry, Australian National University, Canberra

== Awards and honours ==
- 1944 H.G. Smith Medal, Royal Australian Chemical Institute
- 1945 Syme Research Prize, University of Melbourne
- 1953 Elected FRS
- 1954 Elected FAA
- 1965 Matthew Flinders Medal and Lecture
- 1973 Davy Medal, Royal Society of London
- 1974–1976 President of the Dalton Division of the Chemical Society
- 1975 Award for Solid State Chemistry, Royal Society of Chemistry
- 1975 Longstaff Medal, Royal Society of Chemistry
- 1978 Honorary Fellow, Indian Academy of Sciences
- 1979 Hon. DSc, University of Bath
- 1980 Hugo Muller Medal/Lecture, Royal Society of Chemistry
