= Ian Parsons =

British mineralogist (born 1939)

Ian Parsons FRSE
- Born: 5 December 1939 (age 86)
- Education: Durham University (BSc, PhD)
- Awards: Schlumberger Medal (1993)
- Scientific career
- Fields: Mineralogy, petrology
- Workplaces: University of Aberdeen; University of Edinburgh
- Thesis: Geology of the Loch Ailsh complex, Assynt (1963)
- Doctoral advisor: C. H. Emeleus

Ian Parsons (born 5 December 1939) is a British mineralogist and petrologist who is emeritus professor of mineralogy at the University of Edinburgh.

His research has focused particularly on feldspar minerals and igneous petrology.

Parsons studied at Durham University, graduating with a BSc in 1960. He received his PhD from Durham in 1963.

== Career and research ==
After a year as a postdoctoral researcher at the University of Manchester, he joined the University of Aberdeen as a lecturer in geology and was appointed a professor there in 1983.

In 1988, Parsons moved to the University of Edinburgh, where he became professor of mineralogy and served as head of department from 1993 to 1996. He is now emeritus professor of mineralogy at the university.

Parsons has specialised in the mineralogy and microstructure of feldspars and the petrology of layered alkaline intrusions, particularly those of South Greenland. He served as president of the International Mineralogical Association (IMA) from 2002 to 2006.

== Honours ==
Parsons was elected a Fellow of the Royal Society of Edinburgh in 1984. In 1993, he received the Schlumberger Medal of the Mineralogical Society of Great Britain and Ireland.
