= Australian Dung Beetle Project =

Scientific research and biological control project

The Australian Dung Beetle Project (1965–1985), conceived and led by George Bornemissza of the Commonwealth Scientific and Industrial Research Organisation (CSIRO), was an international scientific research and biological control project using introduced species with the primary goal to control the polluting effects of cattle dung.

== Background and inception ==
Upon his arrival to Australia from Hungary in 1951, Dr Bornemissza, an entomologist and ecologist, noted that Australian farmland was covered in a large number of cattle dung pads. This was in contrast to the fields of Europe where the dung was removed and recycled back into the soil by various species of dung beetle (coprids). Native Australian species of beetle had co-evolved alongside marsupials such as the kangaroo and wombat, which produce small, hard, dry and fibrous pellets of dung. Cattle were relatively recently introduced to Australia by European settlers with the First Fleet in 1788 carrying a small herd of two bulls and seven cows. In the early 1800's cattle production greatly increased.

Cattle produce large, soft, moist dung pads. Native beetles, with a few exceptions, are not adapted to utilise this type of dung as a food source or breeding ground and so without such fauna, the dung pads remain on the pasture and take months or even years to decompose. Cattle will not feed from the area of rank pasture surrounding the dung pad, and with the large quantity of dung produced (up to 12 pads per animal per day), this reduces the area of land available for cattle grazing by as much as 200,000 hectares (2,000 km^{2}) per year. Cattle dung is also a primary breeding ground for several pestilent species of fly and parasitic worm. Bornemissza suggested in 1960 that the introduction to Australia of foreign dung beetle species, which had co-evolved alongside bovines and large herbivores, would be beneficial in removing the dung, thus improving cattle grazing and nutrient recycling and reducing the number of flies and worms.

== Aims of the project ==
The overall aim of the Australian Dung Beetle Project was to establish a "minifauna", that is, a subsection of the natural dung beetle fauna, of introduced dung beetles on the Australian mainland and in Tasmania. Once introduced, dung beetles in Australia were studied in order to determine their effects on:

Soil quality
Experiments were carried out in South Africa to assess the rate at which dung beetles returned dung to the soil to aid nutrient recycling. It was found that dung beetles returned over 90% of the faecal nitrogen excreted by each steer during the summer grazing season. Further experiments showed that the uptake of the essential minerals nitrogen, phosphorus and sulphur in plants was over 80% greater in soils where dung beetles were active compared to those where they were not. In addition, tunnelling dung beetles assist root penetration and improve water infiltration to the soil, thereby reducing runoff which can lead to the pollution of waterways

Fly control
Introducing dung beetles as a means to control fly populations was first utilised in Hawaii as a biological control against the horn fly (Haematobia irritans irritans). It was found that 96% fewer flies emerged from dung pads in open pastures with a dung beetle fauna in Hawaii compared to controls. It was surmised that the introduction of dung beetles to Australia would also have a reducing effect on the number of bush flies (Musca vetustissima) and the blood-sucking buffalo fly (Haematobia irritans exigua). In addition to dung beetles, predacious beetles of the Histerid family, which are less sensitive to changes in soil moisture, were introduced to Australia as another means of controlling fly populations during periods of relative inactivity by dung beetles. However, these beetles were found to make little difference to the abundance of flies, so their introduction was discontinued in 1971.

Worm control
In experiments in Pretoria, dung beetles were shown to be effective at controlling infective worm populations breeding in dung. The activity of a complex of at least 20 species of coprid in cattle and sheep dung produced an average reduction of 85% of worms.

Care had to be taken to introduce only those species that would be most compatible with the Australian climates and soil types, that were not under great threat of predation or of themselves becoming pests, and that effectively dispersed dung pads within an ideal time frame of 48 hours so as to minimise successful fly and worm breeding by disrupting their reproductive cycles.

== Quarantine ==
It was estimated that as many as 160 species of dung beetle would need to be imported into Australia in order to establish a minifauna of beetles that would be suitably adapted for the different Australian climates and soil types. However, it was also important that no other potential pests "piggy-backed" their way to Australia with the beetles. Therefore, strict quarantine measures were established to ensure no pestilent species made their way to Australia.

The first beetles to be imported to Australia came from Hawaii. Here, dung beetles, particularly the species Onthophagus gazella, had already been successfully introduced from Africa in order to help biologically control the numbers of horn fly. It was thought that these beetles would be a safe source since the only parasite present in Hawaii that does not already exist in Australia is the giant liver fluke, Fasciola gigantean, the eggs of which do not survive ingestion by beetles. Samples of O. gazella were shipped to the CSIRO research base in Canberra, where they were kept under quarantine and observed before potential release. Unfortunately, direct importation from Hawaii was found to be unviable since it was discovered that the beetles were infested with potentially harmful pyemotid mites. For this reason, these particular beetles were never released onto Australian pastures.

However, the mite-infested beetles were not destroyed and were instead used to breed new generations of beetles under sterile conditions. Dung beetle eggs were dipped in 3% formalin for 3 minutes to sterilise them, then packed into hand-rolled dung balls for incubation. These eggs successfully developed into adult beetles and were among those in the first batches released into the wild on 30 January 1968 in Lansdown, near Townsville, Queensland. This quarantine method was subsequently adopted at the CSIRO research base in Pretoria, South Africa, with the added step of the eggs being transported by air in sealed containers of sterile peat moss.

== First introductions ==
In the early years of the project, the dung beetle species O. gazella, which was able to remove dung pads in as little as 24 hours, showed the most promise in becoming established in Australia. After the first stocks were released onto pastureland in Northern Queensland in 1968, beetle recapture figures showed that the species had spread at the rate of 50–80 km per season, including the colonisation of two islands, Magnetic Island and Palm Island, 10 km and 30 km offshore respectively. By April 1970, O. gazella was firmly established over an area of 400 km^{2}.

This performance however, was not uniformly excellent in all areas of Australia at all times of the season or year and so showed that Australia would need a number of other dung beetle species to fill the gaps in O. gazella's activity.

== Australian Dung Beetle Project Research Unit in Pretoria ==
In order to find a suitable minifauna of beetles for Australia, Bornemissza set up the Australian Dung Beetle Research Unit in Pretoria, South Africa to find species that would complement the work of O. gazella. South Africa was chosen as a location to study dung beetles for several reasons. Firstly, there are a large number of different species from which to choose from (some 800 species south of the Zambezi and Kunene rivers alone), and these species have co-evolved alongside large bovids (e.g. African buffalo) for many thousands of years. There are also homologies between the sub-tropical climates of areas of the two countries. The political climate in other parts of Africa and the more advanced nature of scientific research in South Africa also made it an ideal location. The Plant Protection Research Institute in South Africa funded much of the work at this research base. Further field stations were also maintained in Cape Town during 1978-1980 and in Hluhluwe Game Reserve during 1981–1986.

The aim was to find beetles that would match, as closely as possible, 8 selection criteria:

1. Genuine dung-breeders
Dung beetles for introduction to Australia needed to breed solely in dung and with no other food sources so as to avoid the species' becoming pests in other habitats and to eliminate the possibility that they would avoid cattle dung altogether.

2. Predominantly bovine dung-breeders
Dung beetles tend to have a preference for a particular type of dung. To avoid the introduced dung beetles out-competing native Australian species of coprid that have a preference for other types of dung, the introduced species needed to prefer cattle dung over other types.

3. Dung burial efficiency
The criterion was set that dung beetles selected for importation to Australia should be able to bury at least 25 ml of dung per pair per day, on a pro-rata basis depending on beetle size and rate of activity.

4. Ease of handling
Beetles were chosen for export, which were able to breed easily in insectaries and could withstand the strict quarantine procedures imposed by Australian customs.

5. Fast breeder
Preference was given to dung beetle species that were able to reproduce quickly in order to maintain large stocks of beetles for release onto pastureland.

6. Compatibility
In order to minimise interspecific competition, dung beetles selected for export to Australia needed to be compatible with each other. Beetles that had co-evolved and co-existed (usually found on the same dung pads) were preferred.

7. Distribution range
Beetles adapted to a wide geographical range were preferred as this gave an indication as to how well they would establish across the range of climates found in the large Australian continent.

8. Taxonomy
Although not always possible, researchers preferred to select beetles that could be easily identified in terms of their taxonomy so as to be able to correctly identify them in mark, release and recapture follow-up experiments.

While most of this research was carried out in South Africa, it was recognised that further study in other areas of the world would be useful in selecting dung beetle species for introduction to Australian climates not matched by those in South Africa. To this end, a further research unit was set up in Montpellier, France, as a base from which to study European species that may be more suited for introduction to cooler, southern areas of Australia.

== Beetle collection surveys ==
Two types of field research were carried out in Pretoria to identify beetles that would be suitable for export to Australia. Firstly, researchers took stocktaking trips to locations around South Africa in order to collect data on the biodiversity and ecological abundance of the beetle fauna of an area, as well as the environmental conditions preferred by different species. Secondly, species earmarked as being potential candidates for biological control were then collected and taken back to the research base laboratory where experiments were carried out to determine such things as beetle biology, habits, dung-disposing capacity, reproductive cycles and the ability to withstand quarantining procedures. It was necessary to devise and record methods of propagating dung beetles in large numbers, and this information forwarded onto the research base in Australia. In addition, extensive studies were carried out in the beetles' native habitat to study their likely distribution patterns in Australia and thus aid in the selection of sites for their introduction. Later research has found that habitat specificity matching is one of the most important factors in determining whether or not an introduced species is successful in becoming established.

Samples of beetles that had already been successfully introduced to Australia were also collected for further study. This was important so as to enrich the gene pool of beetle species within Australia and reduce the liability of any one species to become extinct because of a disease or chance mutation. Genetic variants were also imported to Hawaii in order to enrich the genetic diversity in that region, and as a thank you to the island for being cooperative in the research.

== CSIRO Dung Beetle Research base in Canberra ==
On arrival at the Canberra research unit, beetle eggs were transferred to dung balls and incubated. Adult beetles were then bred in insectaries for two or more generations in sterile conditions to eliminate the possibility of co-breeding parasitic mites or diseases endemic to Africa such as foot-and-mouth. Some beetle species were rejected at this stage and not subsequently released onto pastureland because difficulty was experienced in rearing those that entered a period of dormancy and some simply did not survive the stringent quarantining procedures.

Beetles that successfully survived and reproduced were despatched by air or road to cooperating farmers or CSIRO staff. They were packed into ventilated crates of damp peat and thousands at a time were simply tipped onto fresh dung pads at the chosen release sites. Most beetles were observed to instantly bury themselves into the dung. From then on, farmers helped to monitor beetle distribution and activity and carried identification cards in their vehicles so that they could monitor beetle activity.

The original review paper by Bornemissza states that by 1975, 23 species of dung beetle, including 3 genetic variants, had been released. By 1984, this number was 43 species, although it was found that 20 of these failed to establish. As well as the original "star" of the program, Onthophagus gazella, establishing well, other species such as Euoniticellus intermedius, Onthophagus binodis and Liatongus militaris were shown to have reproduced in their thousands and became abundant enough to allow the transfer of subpopulations of certain colonies to establish in new areas.

== Further dung beetle research ==
The Australian Dung Beetle Project came to an end in 1986 when the Australian Meat Research Committee (AMRC), which then became the Australian Meat and Livestock Research and Development Corporation, withdrew their funding due to a shift in the focus of their work from on-farm production to off-farm marketing.

In 1998, interest in the project was revived when John Feehan, the manager of Soilcam, was invited by the Taroom Shire Landcare Group to give a seminar on the use of dung beetles. This led to Soilcam leading a two-week survey of the dung beetle fauna in south-eastern Queensland. The following December, groups of interested parties including graziers, scientists, government agencies and community groups met in Brisbane to discuss the future direction of dung beetle activities in Australia, and this in turn led to the formation of the National Dung Beetle Steering Committee, chaired by Mick Alexander. This committee proposed that a dung beetle project be undertaken in Queensland, which became a reality, thanks to funding from the National Heritage Trust, in October 2000.

The objective of the Queensland Dung Beetle Project was to provide the first comprehensive and quantitative survey of the distribution and abundance of dung beetles across Queensland since the original CSIRO project, and to redistribute successful introduced species to other areas where they might be beneficial. This project was entitled "Improving Sustainable Land Management Systems in Queensland using Dung Beetles" and lasted for two years from January 2001 until December 2002.

The Queensland Dung Beetle project used pitfall traps at sites across Queensland to trap dung beetles, which were then identified and recorded. Out of the 29 species that were introduced to Queensland during the Australian Dung Beetle Project of 1965–1985, 15 of these were recaptured in 2001–2002. The most abundant and widely distributed of these were Onthophagus gazella and Euoniticellus intermedius. Some species, including Copris diversus and Onitis westermanni, which had been released during the original CSIRO project, were not recovered at all in the Queensland Dung Beetle Project, suggesting that they have not become established. Others, for example Onthophagus obliquus and Sisyphus infuscatus have been recovered since their original release but were also not found during this study. The project identified three species, namely Onitis caffer, Copris elphenor, and Onitis vanderkelleni as candidates for redistribution to other areas of Queensland. These were chosen because, although they were not widely distributed across Queensland, they successfully established in the areas where they were found and had desirably rapid dung-burying capabilities.

The Queensland Dung Beetle Project concluded that one outcome of the study was to confirm the "outstanding success" of the original CSIRO project to select and introduce dung beetles into Australia, and "the impact of this on soil, water and pasture health, and on control of pest flies is undoubtedly worth many millions of dollars a year". Further to this, the success of the Australian Dung Beetle Project is claimed to be the reason why Australians can now enjoy a café culture, as up until the 1950s, bush flies were so problematic that it was illegal for restaurants and cafés to offer outside dining unless a designated area was enclosed by fly-wire. A lesser effect has been had, however, on reducing the populations of Buffalo fly. This species of blood sucking fly remains a pest to livestock in Australia although they are present, but not pestilent in South Africa. Suggestions have been made that Australia needs further introduced species of predatory beetle (e.g. histerids) in order to help reduce the numbers of these flies.

A report by Penny Edwards of Landcare Australia in 2007 revealed that 23 species of beetle that had been introduced to Australia during the CSIRO project were still established species, whereas 20 had failed to establish (see table 1). The report recommended that in order to complete the work started by the Australian Dung Beetle Project, further action is required to:

- identify geographical gaps in dung beetle distribution across the whole of Australia;
- identify seasonal gaps in dung beetle activity in all climate zones of Australia;
- clarify the role of native dung beetle species in the dispersal of cattle dung;
- undertake appropriate redistribution of introduced species;
- identify a suitable repository of unpublished dung beetle data; and
- address the potential need for further introductions of dung beetles to Australia.

The Dung Beetle Ecosystem Engineers project commenced in 2017 and runs until 2022. The project has been tasked with the key objective of expanding the range of dung beetles in Australia and analysing their performance for livestock producers. Funding for the project has been contributed by the Australian Government Department of Agriculture and Water Resources as part of its Rural R&D for Profit program, the MLA Donor Company, and various project partners.

In 2018, John Feehan recorded Canberra's first fly-free summer, which he attributed to the introduction of dung beetles.

Table 1: Species of introduced dung beetle that have established in Australia^{§}
Species	Country of origin	Total released	First release	Last release	Areas of release	Areas established	Pasture type
Bubas bison	France, Spain	1,613	April 1983	1996 (not by CSIRO)	WA	NSW, SA, WA	Winter rainfall
Copris elphenor Klug	South Africa	2,287	January 1977	May 1983	QLD	QLD	Summer rainfall
Copris hispanus Linnaeus	Spain	294	October 1983	June 1994	WA	WA	Winter rainfall
Euoniticellus africanus Harold	South Africa	49,009	October 1971	February 1984	NSW, QLD, SA, Tas, Vic, WA	NSW, QLD	Summer rainfall
Euoniticellus fulvus Goeze	France, Turkey	76,944	March 1978	February 1983	NSW, SA, Tas, Vic, WA	NSW, SA, Tas, Vic, WA	Winter rainfall
Euoniticellus intermedius Reiche	South Africa	248,637	November 1971	February 1984	ACT, NSW, NT, QLD, SA, Vic, WA	NSW, NT, QLD, SA, Vic, WA	Summer rainfall
Euoniticellus pallipes Fabricius	Iran, Turkey	46,642	March 1977	September 1982	NSW, SA, WA	NSW, SA, Vic, WA	Winter rainfall
Geotrupes spiniger Marsham	France	12,082	April 1979	December 1983	ACT, NSW, Tas, Vic	ACT, NSW, SA, Tas, Vic	Winter rainfall
Liatongus militaris Castelnau	South Africa (via Hawaii)	70,450	January 1968	November 1979	NSW, NT, QLD, WA	NSW, NT, QLD	Summer rainfall
Onitis alexis Fabricius	South Africa	186,441	August 1972	February 1984	NSW, NT, QLD, WA	NSW, NT, QLD, SA, Vic, WA	Rainfall, summer rainfall, winter rainfall
Onitis aygalus Fabricius	South Africa	18,682	January 1977	January 1982	NSW, SA, WA	NSW, SA, Vic, WA	Winter rainfall
Onitis caffer Boheman	South Africa	8,738	October 1979	April 1984	WA	QLD, NSW, SA	Summer rainfall, winter rainfall
Onitis pecuarius Lansberge	South Africa	11,395	November 1976	May 1979	NSW, QLD	NSW, QLD	Summer rainfall
Onitis vanderkelleni Lansberge	Kenya, Rwanda, Zaire	10,852	October 1974	February 1982	NSW, QLD	QLD	Summer rainfall
Onitis viridulus Bohemann	South Africa	8,008	September 1976	July 1980	NSW, NT, QLD	NSW, NT, QLD, WA	Summer rainfall
Onthophagus binodis Thunberg	South Africa	173,018	October 1971	February 1982	NSW, QLD, SA, Tas, Vic, WA, Norfolk Island	NSW, QLD, SA, Tas, Vic, WA, Norfolk Island	Winter rainfall
Onthophagus gazella Fabricius	South Africa	420,415	February 1968	February 1984	ACT, NSW, NT, QLD, SA, Tas, Vic, WA, Norfolk Island	ACT, NSW, NT, QLD, SA, WA, Norfolk Island	Summer rainfall
Onthophagus nigiventris d'Orbigny	East Africa	29,960	May 1975	March 1983	NSW	NSW	Summer rainfall
Onthophagus obliquus	Nigeria, Senegal, Zaire	9,300	January 1976	November 1977	QLD, NT	QLD	Summer rainfall
Onthophagus sagittarius	Sri Lanka (via Hawaii)	9,075	January 1968	March 1977	NSW, NT, QLD, WA	NSW, NT	Summer rainfall
Onthophagus taurus Schreber	Spain, Greece, Italy, Turkey	164,499	February 1975	January 1984	NSW, SA, Tas, Vic, WA	NSW, SA, Tas, Vic, WA	Winter rainfall
Sisyphus rubrus Paschalidis	South Africa	85,933	March 1973	February 1980	NSW, QLD, WA	NSW, QLD	Summer rainfall
Sisyphus spinipes	South Africa	36,125	March 1972	December 1978	NSW, NT, QLD, WA	NSW, QLD	Summer rainfall
	Total:	1,680,399					
Key: § modified from a table in Edwards (2007) with some additional information from Edwards, et al. (2007) and African Dung Beetles Online † ACT = Australian Capital Territory, NSW = New South Wales, NT = Northern Territories, QLD = Queensland, SA = South Australia, Tas = Tasmania, Vic = Victoria, WA = Western Australia.

== See also ==
- Biological pest control
- National Heritage Trust
- Landcare Australia
