= Marjorie Wilson =

British geologist (born 1951)

Marjorie Wilson (also known as B. Marjorie Wilson) (born 1951) is an English geologist and petrologist known for her formative work on the origin of igneous rocks. Her most significant book is Igneous Petrogenesis: A Global Tectonic Approach, published in 1989. The book was reprinted in 2007.

== Academic career ==
Wilson studied at St Hilda's College, Oxford and graduated with a first class BA in Geology in 1973, later converted to an MA. She took an MA at the University of California, Berkeley also in Geology in 1974 and a PhD in Geology at the University of Leeds in 1976.

Wilson was a Natural Environment Research Council (NERC) Post-doctoral Research Fellow at the University of Leeds from 1976 to 1978. She spent the rest of her career at Leeds, becoming Lecturer in Igneous Petrology in 1978 and Senior Lecturer in 1991. In 1998 she was appointed Professor of Igneous Petrogenesis and, since 2013, she has been Emeritus Professor of Igneous Petrogenesis at Leeds.

Wilson was executive editor of the Journal of Petrology from 1994 to 2020.

== Awards and honors ==
In 1998, Wilson was elected a foreign member of the Norwegian Academy of Science and Letters. In 2000, she received an Honorary Doctor of Philosophy from Uppsala University. In 2006, she received the Coke Medal from Geological Society of London.

== Personal life ==
Wilson was married to Alastair Lumsden, previously Senior Lecturer in the Faculty of Earth and Environment at the University of Leeds. He died on 22 July 2019, aged 81.

== Selected works ==
- Beccaluva, Luigi; Bianchini, Gianluca; Wilson, B. Marjorie (2007). Cenozoic Volcanism in the Mediterranean Area. Geological Society of America. ISBN 978-0-8137-2418-8.
- Wilson, B. Marjorie (2004). Permo-carboniferous Magmatism and Rifting in Europe. Geological Society of London. ISBN 978-1-86239-152-9.
- Wilson, M (2012). Igneous Petrogenesis. Springer Science & Business Media. ISBN 978-94-010-9388-0.
