= CSIRO =

Federal government agency for scientific research in Australia

Commonwealth Scientific and Industrial Research Organisation (CSIRO)

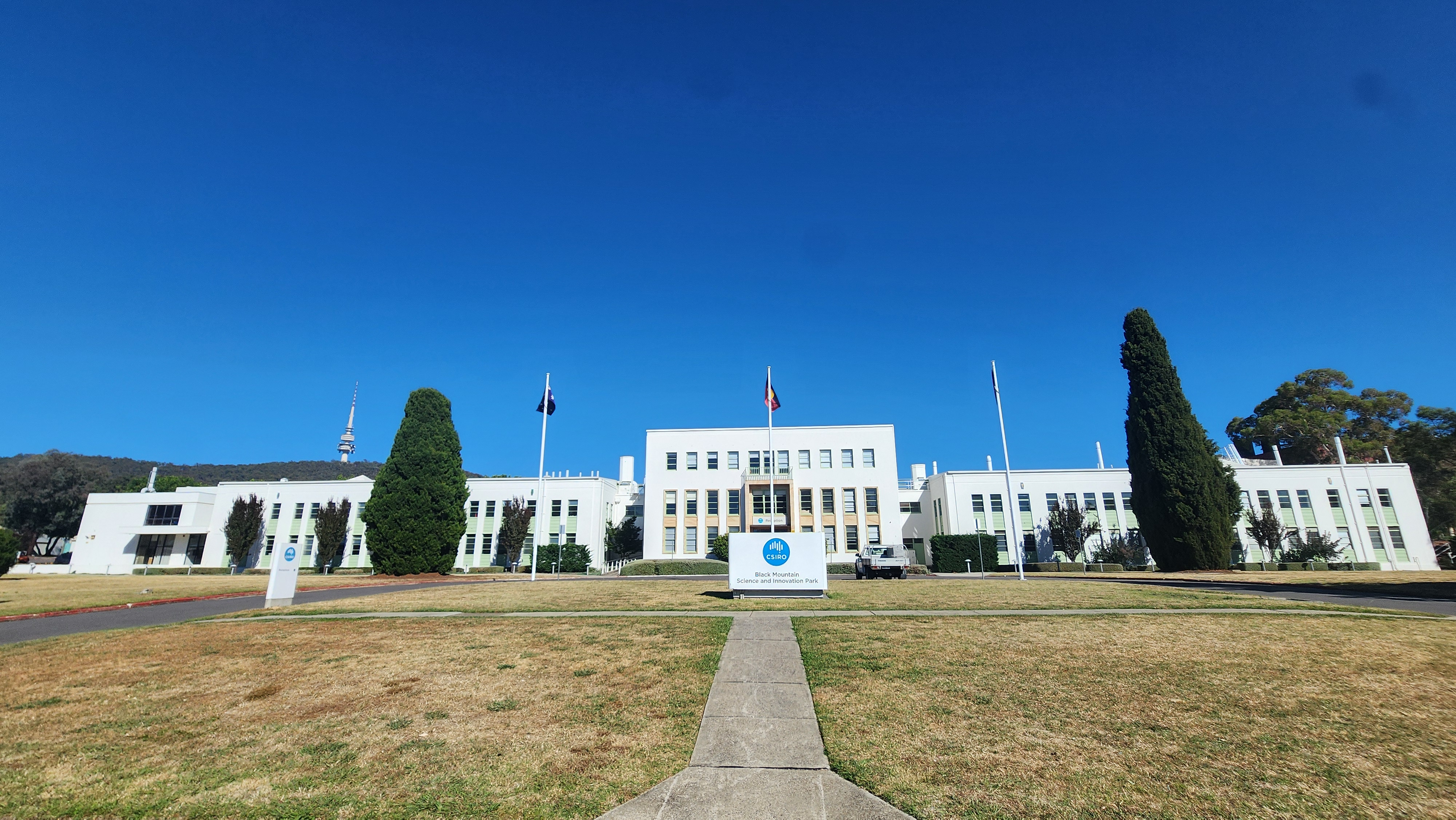
- CSIRO Black Mountain Laboratories

Agency overview
- Formed: 1916
- Preceding agencies: Advisory Council of Science and Industry (1916–1920); Institute of Science and Industry (1920–1926); Commonwealth Institute of Science and Industry (1926–1949)
- Jurisdiction: Australia
- Headquarters: Canberra, Australian Capital Territory, Australia
- Motto: We deliver the science Australians need for the nation they want – productive, sustainable, healthy and secure.
- Employees: 6,618 (2024)
- Annual budget: $1.008 billion (2024)
- Minister responsible: Tim Ayres, Minister for Industry and Innovation
- Agency executives: Ming Long AM, Chair; Doug Hilton, Chief executive
- Parent agency: Department of Industry, Science and Resources
- Website: www.csiro.au

The Commonwealth Scientific and Industrial Research Organisation (CSIRO) is an Australian Government agency that is responsible for scientific research and its commercial and industrial applications. From its headquarters in Canberra, CSIRO maintains more than 50 sites across Australia, as well as in France and the United States, and employs 6,618 staff as of 2024.

Federally-funded scientific research in Australia began in 1916 with the creation of the Advisory Council of Science and Industry, which was renamed to Commonwealth Institute of Science and Industry in 1920. However, both bodies struggled due to insufficient funding. In 1926, research efforts were revitalised with the establishment of the Council for Scientific and Industrial Research (CSIR), which strengthened national science leadership and increased research funding. CSIR grew rapidly, achieving significant early successes. In 1949, legislative changes led to the renaming of the organisation as Commonwealth Scientific and Industrial Research Organisation (CSIRO).

Among the developments by CSIRO have been the invention of atomic absorption spectroscopy, essential components of early Wi-Fi technology, the first commercially successful polymer banknote, the invention of the insect repellent Aerogard, and the introduction of a series of biological controls into Australia, such as myxomatosis and rabbit calicivirus for the control of rabbit populations.

== Structure ==
CSIRO is governed by a board appointed by the Australian Government, currently chaired by Ming Long AM. There are eight directors inclusive of the chief executive, presently Doug Hilton, who are responsible for management of the organisation.

== Research and focus areas ==
CSIRO is structured into Research Business Units, National Facilities and Collections, and Services.

=== Research Business Units ===
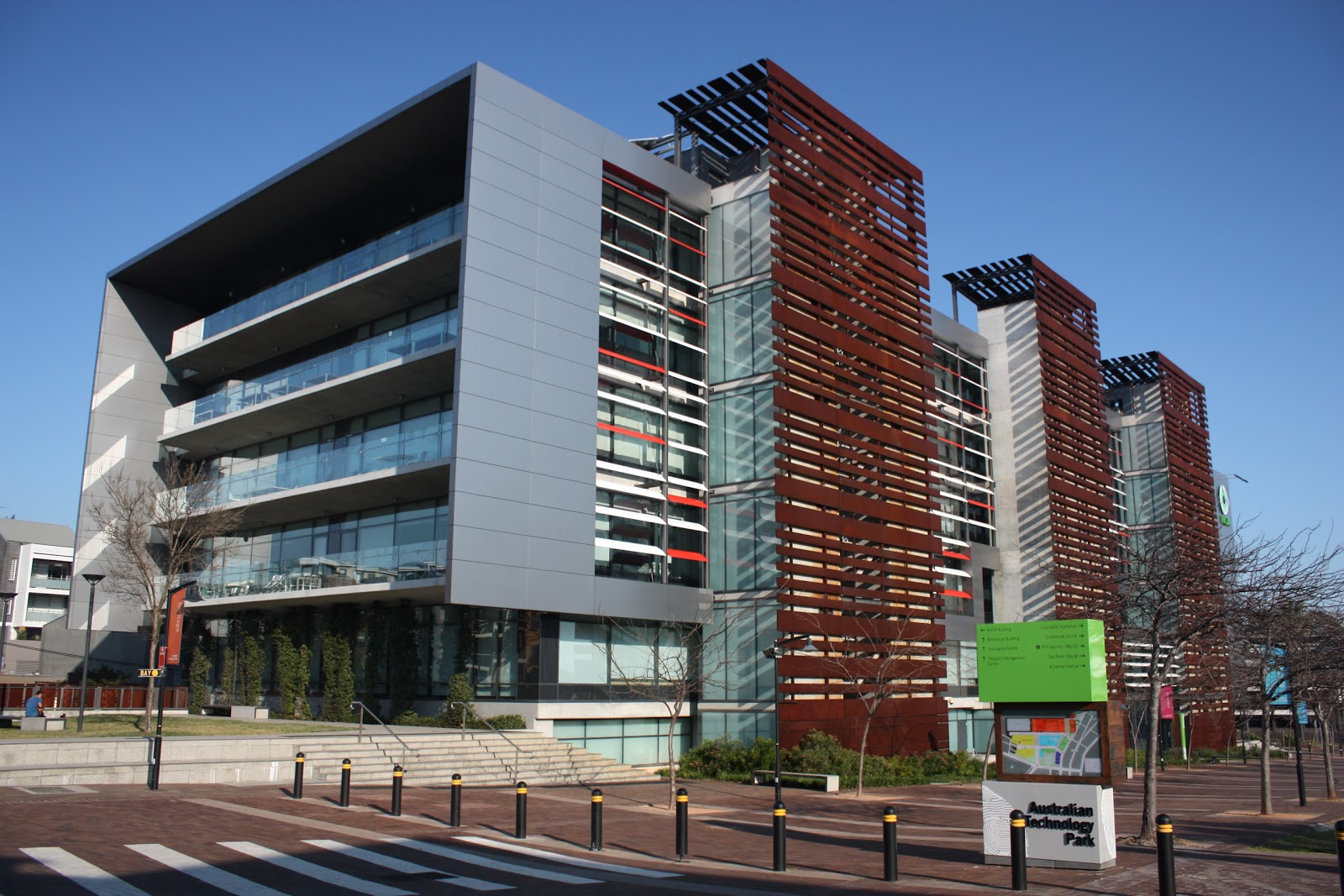
Data 61 head office, Eveleigh, New South Wales

As at 2023, CSIRO's research areas are identified as "Impact science" and organised into the following Business Units:

- Agriculture and Food
- Health and Biosecurity
- Data61
- Energy
- Manufacturing
- Mineral Resources
- Space and Astronomy
- Environment (being the amalgamation of the former Land and Water and Oceans & Atmosphere BUs)

=== National facilities and collections ===
==== National facilities ====
CSIRO manages national research facilities and scientific infrastructure on behalf of the nation to assist with the delivery of research. The national facilities and specialised laboratories are available to both international and Australian users from industry and research. As at 2019, the following National Facilities are listed:

- Australian Centre for Disease Preparedness (ACDP)
- Australia Telescope National Facility – radio telescopes included in the Facility include the Australia Telescope Compact Array, the Parkes Observatory, Mopra Telescope and the Australian Square Kilometre Array Pathfinder
- Canberra Deep Space Communication Complex
- Energy Centre and National Solar Energy Centre
- Marine National Facility (R.V. "Investigator")
- New Norcia ground station
- NovaSAR-1 satellite
- Pawsey Supercomputing Centre

==== Collections ====
CSIRO manages a number of collections of animal and plant specimens that contribute to national and international biological knowledge. The National Collections contribute to taxonomic, genetic, agricultural and ecological research. As at 2019, CSIRO's Collections are listed as the following:

- Australian National Algae Culture Collection
- The Atlas of Living Australia
- Australian Tree Seed Centre
- Australian National Fish Collection
- Australian National Insect Collection
- Australian National Herbarium
- Australian National Soil Archive (managed through A&F)
- Australian National Wildlife Collection
- Cape Grim Air Archive

=== Services ===
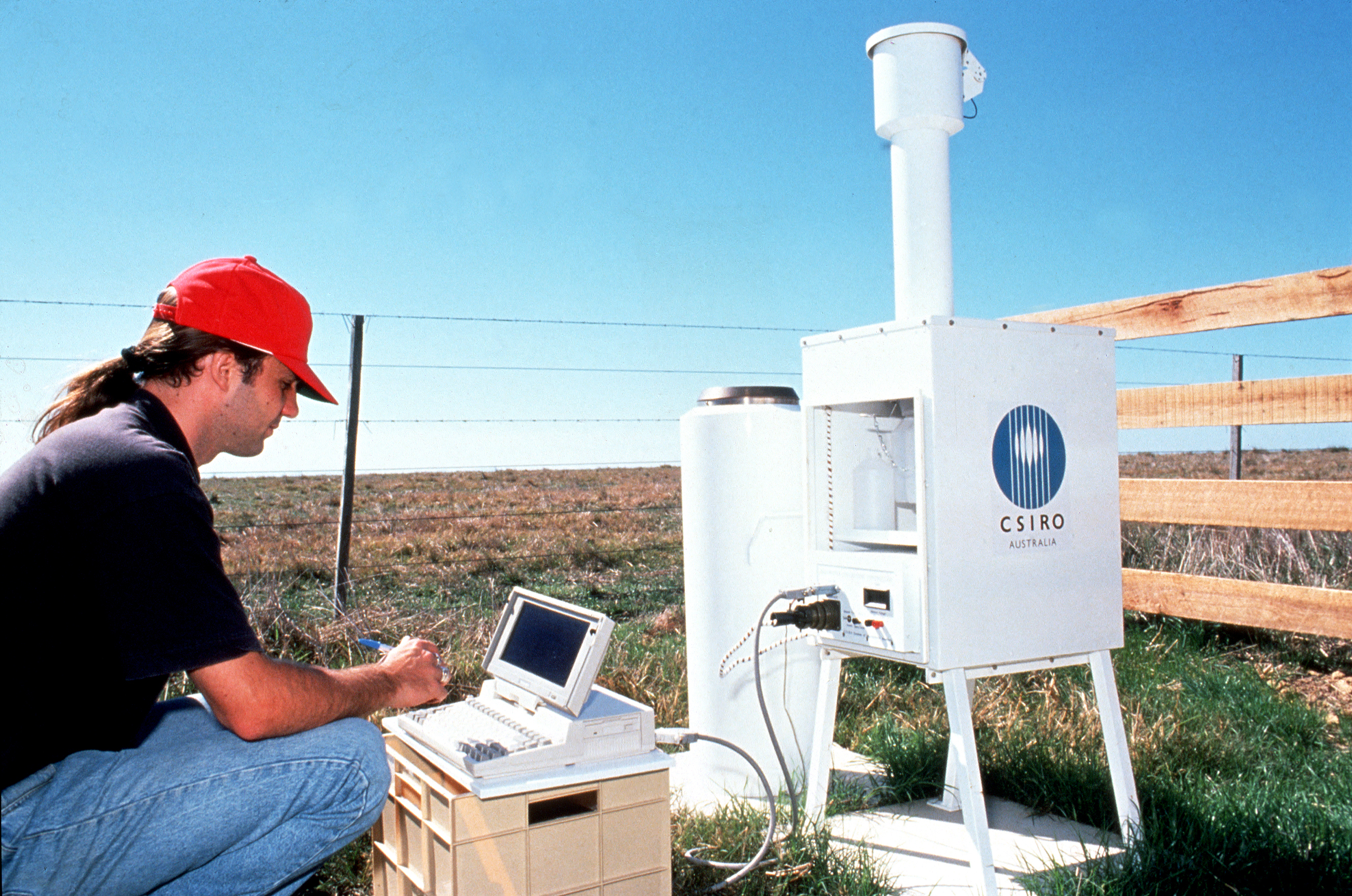
An automatic rainwater collector, designed by CSIRO for measuring acidity of rainfall in remote areas (February 2000)

In 2019, CSIRO Services are itemised as follows:

- Materials and infrastructure services
- Agricultural and environmental analysis
- Environmental services
- Biological, food and medical science services
- Australian Animal Health Laboratory services

Other services are noted as including education, publishing, infrastructure technologies, Small and Medium Enterprise engagement and CSIRO Futures.

== History ==
=== Evolution of the organisation ===
In In 1915, prime minister Billy Hughes convened a conference in order to establish the Advisory Council of Science and Industry, which was established in 1916. Geologist and polar explorer Sir Douglas Mawson represented the University of Adelaide at the conference, and in early 1916 participated in the first executive meetings of the new body, in which its charter and operational procedures were established. The goal of the Advisory Council was the establishment of a permanent "Institute of Science and Industry".

However, the advisory council struggled with insufficient funding during the First World War. In 1920 the council was renamed the Commonwealth Institute of Science and Industry, established by the Institute of Science and Industry Act 1920. This body was led by George Handley Knibbs (1921–26), but continued to struggle financially.

Implementing the 1923 Imperial Conference's call for colonies to broaden their economic base, in 1926 the Australian Parliament modified the principal Act (the Institute of Science and Industry Act 1920) for national scientific research by passing the Science and Industry Research Act 1926. The same conference led to the creation of the Department of Scientific and Industrial Research in New Zealand.

The new Act replaced the institute with the Council for Scientific and Industrial Research (CSIR). With encouragement from prime minister Stanley Bruce, strengthened national science leadership and increased research funding, CSIR grew rapidly and achieved significant early successes. The council was structured to represent the federal structure of government in Australia, and had state-level committees and a central council. In addition to an improved structure, CSIR benefited from strong bureaucratic management under George Julius, David Rivett, and Arnold Richardson. Research focused on primary and secondary industries. Early in its existence, CSIR established divisions studying animal health and animal nutrition. After the Great Depression, research was extended into manufacturing and other secondary industries.

In 1949 the Act was changed again, and the entity name amended to the Commonwealth Scientific and Industrial Research Organisation. The amendment enlarged and reconstituted the organisation and its administrative structure. Under Ian Clunies Ross as chairman, CSIRO pursued new areas such as radio astronomy and industrial chemistry. In 1952, its five key areas were reported as being: industrial microbiology; research of rare minerals; solar energy; finding out what causes lamb and cow infertility; and, lastly agricultural engineering.

CSIRO still operates under the provisions of the 1949 Act in a wide range of scientific inquiry.

Participation by women in CSIRO research was severely limited by the Australian government policy, in place until 1966, forcing women public servants out of their jobs when they married. Even unmarried women were considered a poor investment because they might eventually marry. Single women such as Helen Newton Turner nevertheless made major contributions.

Since 1949, CSIRO has expanded its activities to almost every field of primary, secondary and tertiary industry, including the environment, human nutrition, conservation, urban and rural planning, and water. It works with leading organisations around the world and maintains more than 50 sites across Australia and in France, Chile and the United States of America, employing about 5500 people.

In 2016 CSIRO launched its "Innovation Catalyst" Strategy which focused on solving Australia's Innovation Dilemma, it generated $10,000,000,000 more social, economic, and environmental value than any prior strategy, and trained 3,500 researchers from across 32 Universities on the process of innovation, and became the first Australian entity of any kind to reach the Thomson Reuters Global Top 25 Innovators.

In March 2025, research from Pollster DemosAU identified the CSIRO as Australia's second most trusted national institution, behind the Bureau of Meteorology.

=== Achievements ===
- National Research "Flagships" launched in 2003, expanded 2007 to $250,000,000 in research funding
- Sues Global Chip makers over WiFi Patent infringement 2005, wins $205,000,000 in 2009, and $105,000,000 by 2016
- Dr Cathy Foley becomes CSIRO's first Chief Scientist in 2018, then Australia's Chief Scientist in 2021
- CSIRO becomes first Australian entity to reach the Thomson Reuters Global Top 25 Innovators, beating NASA in 2018
- Health Business Unit is created in 2016, enables scale up and, in partnership with CSL, mass production of Australia's only COVID vaccine in 2020, and invests $450,000,000 to create Australian Center for Disease Preparedness
- CSIRO makes first acquisition, NICTA creating Australia's largest Digital and AI group
- "ON" becomes Australia's first National Science Accelerator, training 3,500 university researchers across 33 institutions, and beating the prestigious US iCorps program by 2018, with 300% higher financial outcomes, diversity, and innovation ecosystem penetration
- Female leadership doubles by 2020, bringing CSIRO into the Sage "green" zone for gender equity for first time in 100y
- CSIRO marches in Sydney Gay & Lesbian Mardi Gras for first time, CEO joins
- Main Sequence Ventures is created in 2017 as first Venture Capital fund inside government, becomes $1,000,000,000 top-quartile global fund
- By 2023 "Innovation Catalyst" strategy creates $10,000,000,000 more value than any prior strategy, and $400,000,000 per year greater investment in science
- CSIRO wins Roy Morgan Most Trusted Brand for first time in 2022
- CSIRO achieves first emissions reduction in 100y, reaching 83% of Net Zero by 2022

=== Inventions ===
Notable inventions and breakthroughs by CSIRO include:

- A4 DSP chip
- Aerogard, insect repellent
- Atomic absorption spectroscopy
- Biological control of Salvinia
- Development of Linola (a flax variety with low alpha-linolenic acid content) with a longer life used as a stockfeed
- Distance measuring equipment (DME) used for aviation navigation
- Gene shears
- Interscan Microwave landing system, a microwave approach and landing system for aircraft
- Use of myxomatosis and calicivirus to control rabbit numbers
- Parkes Radio Telescope
- The permanent pleat for fabrics
- Plasma sintering
- Polymer banknote
- Production of metals from their halides
- Relenza flu drug
- Sirosmelt lance
- "Softly" woollens detergent
- Phase-contrast X-ray imaging
- Method to use titanium in 3D printing
- UltraBattery
- Essential components of Wi-Fi technology
- Zebedee – Mobile Handheld 3D Lidar Mapping technology

=== Historic research ===
CSIRO had a pioneering role in the scientific discovery of the universe through radio "eyes". A team led by Paul Wild built and operated (from 1948) the world's first solar radiospectrograph, and from 1967 the 3-kilometre-diameter (1.9 mi) radioheliograph at Culgoora in New South Wales. For three decades, the Division of Radiophysics had a world-leading role in solar research, attracting prominent solar physicists from around the world.

CSIRO owned the first computer in Australia, CSIRAC, built as part of a project began in the Sydney Radiophysics Laboratory in 1947. The CSIR Mk 1 ran its first program in 1949, the fifth electronic computer in the world. It was over 1,000 times faster than the mechanical calculators available at the time. It was decommissioned in 1955 and recommissioned in Melbourne as CSIRAC in 1956 as a general purpose computing machine used by over 700 projects until 1964. The CSIRAC is the only surviving first-generation computer in the world.

Between 1965 and 1985, George Bornemissza of CSIRO's Division of Entomology founded and led the Australian Dung Beetle Project. Bornemissza, upon settling in Australia from Hungary in 1951, noticed that the pastureland was covered in dry cattle dung pads which did not seem to be recycled into the soil and caused areas of rank pasture which were unpalatable to the cattle. He proposed that the reason for this was that native Australian dung beetles, which had co-evolved alongside the marsupials (which produce dung very different in its composition from cattle), were not adapted to utilise cattle dung for their nutrition and breeding since cattle had only relatively recently been introduced to the continent in the 1880s. The Australian Dung Beetle Project sought, therefore, to introduce species of dung beetle from South Africa and Europe (which had co-evolved alongside bovids) in order to improve the fertility and quality of cattle pastures. Twenty-three species were successfully introduced throughout the duration of the project and also had the effect of reducing the pestilent bush fly population by 90%.

=== Domain name ===
CSIRO was the first Australian organisation to start using the Internet and was able to register the second-level domain csiro.au (as opposed to csiro.org.au or csiro.com.au). Guidelines were introduced in 1996 to regulate the use of the .au domain.

== Governance and management ==
When CSIR was formed in 1926, it was led initially by an executive committee of three people, two of whom were designated as the chairman and the chief executive. Since then the roles and responsibilities of the chair and chief executive have changed many times. From 1927 to 1986 the head of CSIR (and from 1949, CSIRO) was the chairman, who was responsible for the management of the organisation, supported by the chief executive. From 1 July 1959 to 4 December 1986 CSIRO had no chief executive; the chairman undertook both functions.

In 1986, when the Australian Government changed the structure of CSIRO to include a board of non-executive members plus the chief executive to lead CSIRO, the roles changed. The chief executive is now responsible for management of the organisation in accordance with the strategy, plans and policies approved by the CSIRO Board which, led by the chair of the board, is responsible to the Australian Government for the overall strategy, governance and performance of CSIRO.

As with its governance structure, the priorities and structure of CSIRO, and the teams and facilities that implement its research, have changed as Australia's scientific challenges have evolved.

Numerous CSIRO scientists have gone onto distinguished careers in the university sector. Several have been appointed to the role of Vice-Chancellor/President. They include: Sir George Currie (UNZ 1952–62, Western Australia 1945–52), Paul Wellings CBE (Wollongong 2012–21, Lancaster 2002–12), Michael Barber AO (Flinders 2008–14), Mark Smith CBE (Southampton 2019–ff, Lancaster 2012–19), Annabelle Duncan (UNE 2014–19), Attila Brungs (UNSW 2021–ff, UTS 2014–21), Alex Zelinsky AO (Newcastle (2018–ff), Andrew Parfitt (UTS 2021–ff), Chris Moran (UNE 2023–ff).

=== Chairs ===
#	Name	Background	Term start	Term end	Duration	Notes
1	George Julius	Mechanical engineer	1 April 1926	31 December 1945	19 years, 8 months	
2	David Rivett	Chemist	1 January 1946	18 May 1949	3 years, 4 months	Acting chair to 31 March 1946
3	Ian Clunies Ross	Veterinary scientist	19 May 1949	20 June 1959	10 years, 1 month	
4	Fred White	Physicist	1 July 1959	22 May 1970	10 years, 10 months	Executive chair
5	Jerry Price	Chemist	26 May 1970	24 March 1977	6 years, 9 months	Executive chair
6	Victor Burgmann	Physicist	25 March 1977	13 December 1978	1 year, 8 months	Executive chair
7	Paul Wild	Astronomer	14 December 1978	24 September 1985	6 years, 9 months	Executive chair
8	Norman Boardman	Chemist	25 September 1985	4 December 1986	1 year, 6 months	Executive chair
9	Neville Wran	Politician	5 December 1986	4 December 1991	4 years, 11 months	
10	Adrienne Clarke	Botanist	5 December 1991	4 December 1996	4 years, 11 months	
11	Charles Allen	Corporate executive	5 December 1996	5 November 2001	4 years, 11 months	
12	Catherine Livingstone	Corporate executive	6 November 2001	31 December 2006	5 years, 1 month	
13	Peter Willcox	Corporate executive	1 January 2007	29 May 2007	4 months	
14	John Stocker	Immunologist	28 June 2007	27 June 2010	2 years, 11 months	
15	Simon McKeon	Corporate executive	28 June 2010	14 October 2015	5 years, 3 months	
16	David Thodey	Corporate executive	15 October 2015	14 October 2021	5 years, 11 months	
17	Kathryn Fagg	Corporate executive	15 October 2021	7 March 2025	5 years, 1 month	
18	Ming Long	Corporate executive	7 March 2025	incumbent	1 year, 8 months	

=== Chief executives ===
#	Name	Background	Term start	Term end	Duration	Notes
1	David Rivett	Chemist	1 January 1927	31 December 1945	18 years, 11 months	
2	A. E. V. Richardson	Agricultural scientist	1 January 1946	18 May 1949	3 years, 4 months	
3	Fred White	Physicist	19 May 1949	13 December 1956	7 years, 6 months	
4	Stewart Bastow	Chemist	1 January 1957	30 June 1959	2 years, 5 months	
Functions of chief executive carried out by chairman from 1959–1986.
5	Norman Boardman	Chemist	5 December 1986	4 March 1990	3 years, 2 months	Acting to 4 March 1987
6	John Stocker	Immunologist	5 March 1990	4 March 1995	4 years, 11 months	
7	Roy Green	Physicist	5 March 1995	3 January 1996	9 months	Acting to 20 July 1995
8	Malcolm McIntosh	Public servant	3 January 1996	7 February 2000	4 years, 1 month	Died in office
–	Colin Adam	Metallurgical engineer	7 February 2000	14 January 2001	11 months	Acting chief executive
9	Geoff Garrett	Metallurgist	15 January 2001	31 December 2008	7 years, 11 months	
10	Megan Clark	Geologist	1 January 2009	19 November 2014	5 years, 10 months	
11	Larry R. Marshall	Physicist	1 January 2015	30 June 2023	8 years, 5 months	
12	Doug Hilton	Molecular biologist	1 July 2023	incumbent	3 years, 4 months	

== Controversies ==
=== Total Wellbeing Diet ===
In 2005 the CSIRO gained worldwide attention, including some criticism, for promoting a high-protein, low-carbohydrate diet of their own creation called Total Wellbeing Diet. The CSIRO published the diet in a book which sold over half a million copies in Australia and over 100,000 overseas. The diet was criticised in an editorial by Nature for giving scientific credence to a "fashionable" diet sponsored by meat and dairy industries.

=== 802.11 patent ===
In the early 1990s, CSIRO radio astronomy scientists John O'Sullivan, Graham Daniels, Terence Percival, Diethelm Ostry and John Deane undertook research directed to finding a way to make wireless networks work as fast as wired networks within confined spaces such as office buildings. The technique they developed, involving a particular combination of forward error correction, frequency-domain interleaving, and multi-carrier modulation, became the subject of U.S. patent 5,487,069, which was granted on 23 January 1996.

In 1997 Macquarie University professor David Skellern and his colleague Neil Weste established the company Radiata, Inc., which took a nonexclusive licence to the CSIRO patent for the purpose of developing commercially viable integrated circuit devices implementing the patented technology.

During this period, the IEEE 802.11 Working Group was developing the 802.11a wireless LAN standard. CSIRO did not participate directly in the standards process, however David Skellern was an active participant as secretary of the Working Group, and representative of Radiata. In 1998 it became apparent that the CSIRO patent would be pertinent to the standard. In response to a request from Victor Hayes of Lucent Technologies, who was chair of the 802.11 Working Group, CSIRO confirmed its commitment to make non-exclusive licenses available to implementers of the standard on reasonable and non-discriminatory terms.

In 1999, Cisco Systems, Inc. and Broadcom Corporation each invested A$4 million in Radiata, representing an 11% stake for each investor and valuing the company at around A$36 million. In September 2000, Radiata demonstrated a chip set complying with the recently finalised IEEE 802.11a Wi-Fi standard, and capable of handling transmission rates of up to 54 Mbit/s, at a major international exhibition.

In November 2000, Cisco acquired Radiata in exchange for US$295 million in Cisco common stock with the intention of incorporating the Radiata Baseband Processor and Radio chips into its Aironet family of wireless LAN products. Cisco subsequently took a large write-down on the Radiata acquisition, following the 2001 telecoms crash, and in 2004 it shut down its internal development of wireless chipsets based on the Radiata technology in order to focus on software development and emerging new technologies.

Controversy over the CSIRO patent arose in 2006 after the organisation won an injunction against Buffalo Technology in an infringement suit filed in Federal Court in the Eastern District of Texas. The injunction was subsequently suspended on appeal, with the Court of Appeals for the Federal Circuit finding that the judge in Texas should have allowed a trial to proceed on Buffalo's challenge to the validity of the CSIRO patent. In 2007, CSIRO declined to provide an assurance to the IEEE that it would not sue companies which refused to take a license for use in 802.11n-compliant devices, while at the same time continuing to defend legal challenges to the validity of the patent brought by Intel, Dell, Microsoft, Hewlett-Packard and Netgear.

In April 2009, Hewlett-Packard broke ranks with the rest of the industry becoming the first to reach a settlement of its dispute with CSIRO. This agreement was followed quickly by settlements with Microsoft, Fujitsu and Asus and then Dell, Intel, Nintendo, Toshiba, Netgear, Buffalo, D-Link, Belkin, SMC, Accton, and 3Com.

The controversy grew after CSIRO sued US carriers AT&T, Verizon and T-Mobile in 2010, with the organisation being accused of being "Australia's biggest patent troll", a wrathful "patent bully", and of imposing a "WiFi tax" on American innovation.

Further fuel was added to the controversy after a settlement with the carriers, worth around $229 million, was announced in March 2012. Encouraged in part by an announcement by the Australian Minister for Tertiary Education, Skills Science and Research, Senator Chris Evans, an article in Ars Technica portrayed CSIRO as a shadowy organisation responsible for US consumers being compelled to make "a multimillion dollar donation" on the basis of a questionable patent claiming "decades old" technology. The resulting debate became so heated that the author was compelled to follow up with a defence of the original article. An alternative view was also published on The Register, challenging a number of the assertions made in the Ars Technica piece.

Total income to CSIRO from the patent is currently estimated at nearly $430 million. On 14 June 2012, the CSIRO inventors received the European Patent Office (EPO) European Inventor Award (EIA), in the category of "Non-European Countries".

=== Genetically modified wheat trials ===
On 14 July 2011, Greenpeace activists vandalised a crop of GM wheat, circumventing the scientific trials being undertaken. Greenpeace was forced to pay reparations to CSIRO of $280,000 for the criminal damage, and were accused by the sentencing judge, Justice Hilary Penfold, of cynically using junior members of the organisation with good standing to avoid custodial sentences, while the offenders were given 9-month suspended sentences.

Following the attack Greenpeace criticised CSIRO for a close relationship with industry that had led to an increase in genetically modified crops, even though a core aim of CSIRO is Cooperative Research "working hand in hand with industry [to] build partnerships and engage with industry to generate impact".

=== Climate change censorship: Clive Spash ===
On 25 November 2009, a debate was held in the Australian Senate concerning the alleged involvement of the CSIRO and the Labor government in censorship. The debate was called for by opposition parties after evidence came to light that a paper critical of carbon emissions trading was being suppressed. At the time, the Labor government was trying to get such a scheme through the Senate. After the debate, the Science Minister, Kim Carr, was forced to release the paper, but when doing so in the Senate he also delivered a letter from the CEO of the CSIRO, Megan Clark, which attacked the report's author and threatened him with unspecified punishment. The author of the paper, Clive Spash, was cited in the press as having been bullied and harassed, and later gave a radio interview about this. In the midst of the affair, CSIRO management had considered releasing the paper with edits that Nature reported would be "tiny". Spash claimed the changes actually demanded amounted to censorship and resigned. He later posted on his website a document detailing the text that CSIRO management demanded be deleted; by itself, this document forms a coherent set of statements criticising emissions trading without any additional wording needed. In subsequent Senate Estimates hearings during 2010, Senator Carr and Clark went on record claiming the paper was originally stopped from publication solely due to its low quality not meeting CSIRO standards. At the time of its attempted suppression, the paper had been accepted for publication in an academic journal, New Political Economy, which in 2010 had been ranked by the Australian Research Council as an 'A class' publication. In an ABC radio interview, Spash called for a Senate enquiry into the affair and the role played by senior management and the Science Minister. After these events, the Sydney Morning Herald reported that "Questions are being raised about the closeness of BHP Billiton and the CSIRO under its chief executive, Megan Clark". After his resignation, an unedited version of the paper was released by Spash as a discussion paper, and later published as an academic journal article.

=== CSIRO–Novartis–DataTrace scandal ===
On 11 April 2013, the Sydney Morning Herald ran a story on how CSIRO had "duped" the Swiss-based pharmaceutical giant Novartis into purchasing an anti-counterfeit technology for its vials of injectable Voltaren. The invention was marketed by a small Australian company called DataTrace DNA as a method of identifying fake vials, on the basis that a unique tracer code developed by CSIRO was embedded in the product. However, the code sold to Novartis for more than A$2M was apparently not unique, and was based on a "cheap tracer ... bought in bulk from a Chinese distributor". Novartis was contractually bound not to reverse-engineer the tracer to verify its uniqueness. The Sydney Morning Herald report alleges that this was done with the knowledge of key CSIRO personnel.

CSIRO has since conducted a full review of the allegations and found no evidence to support them.

=== Alleged bullying, harassment and victimisation ===
Around 2008–2012, CSIRO fell under the spotlight for allegedly exhibiting a culture of workplace bullying and harassment. Former CSIRO employees started to surface with experiences of workplace bullying and other unreasonable behaviour by current and former CSIRO staff members. CSIRO took the allegations seriously and responded to the articles on a number of occasions.

The shadow minister for innovation, industry, science and research, Sophie Mirabella, wrote to the government requesting it establish an inquiry. Mirabella said she is aware of as many as 100 cases of alleged workplace harassment. On 20 July 2012 Comcare issued CSIRO with an Improvement Notice with regard to handling and management of workplace misconduct/code of conduct type investigations and allegations. On 24 June 2013 Mirabella advised the Australian House of Representatives that in relation to the worker's compensation claim for psychological injuries of ex-CSIRO employee, Martin Williams, which was vigorously defended by Comcare on the advice of the CSIRO, that CSIRO officers had provided false testimony on no less than 128 occasions under oath when the matter went before the Administrative Appeals Tribunal. Mirabella stated, "even in establishing the framework for this inquiry it is obvious there's an inappropriate 'hands on' approach by CSIRO."

In response to the allegations Clark commissioned Dennis Pearce, who is assisted by an investigation team from HWL Ebsworth Lawyers, to conduct an independent investigation into allegations of workplace bullying and other unreasonable behaviour. Mirabella continued to question the independence of the investigation. The first stage of the investigation published its findings at the end of July 2013, and the final stage was scheduled to be complete by February 2014. Post the Pearce Report, CSIRO overhauled its relevant policies and put in place training and whistleblower procedures to address the situation.

=== CSIRO and climate change ===
In 2013, the Abbott government cuts $25,000,000 from CSIRO's annual budget, and in 2014 CEO Megan Clarke makes "almost a quarter of CSIRO's scientists redundant"

In 2014, Minister Greg Hunt created NESP, diverting $21,000,000 per year of CSIRO climate funding to competitive Universities

In 2015, Dr Larry Marshall becomes CEO and shifts CSIRO's purpose to solving national challenges with science, launches "Innovation Catalyst Strategy"

In August 2015, the CSIRO discontinued its annual July and August survey, conducted over the previous five years, polling to create a long-term view of how Australians viewed global warming and their support for action. In the previous 2013 poll, 86 per cent agreed with the statement that climate change was occurring and only 7.6 per cent disagreed.

In 2016, Funding cuts of 2014 force 70 redundancies in climate science, Marshall says the argument about climate change is settled so its time to find a solution, compares emotion of debate to religion.

In "an open letter to the Australian Government and CSIRO", 2,800 of the leading climate scientists from 60 countries say the announcement of cuts to the CSIRO's Oceans and Atmosphere research program has alarmed the global climate research community. They say the decision shows a lack of insight and a misunderstanding of the importance of the depth and significance of Australian contributions to global and regional climate research.

Climate lobby, Greens & Labor launch intense political campaign against Marshall – terminating the “failed Marshall plan” and “reversing the cuts and "sacking Marshall" become a focus of Labor's 2016 election campaign.

Labor loses election, value of CSIRO doubles, Marshall becomes longest serving CEO in CSIRO's history.

In 2018, CSIRO creates 1st Net Zero plan for Australia, and demonstrates it by taking all 55 sites across Australia 80% of way to net zero, and doubling value of CSIRO at same time.

The CSIRO has been the target of successive funding cuts under the Morrison government, starting with cuts targeting climate science research initiated by Tony Abbott.

=== Trademark dispute with Cisco ===
CSIRO logo

Cisco Systems logo

In 2015, Cisco Systems filed a trademark infringement lawsuit against CSIRO, claiming that the colours and style of CSIRO's logo were too similar to Cisco's. An Australian court ruled in CSIRO's favor and ordered Cisco to pay CSIRO's court costs.

== See also ==
- Australia Telescope National Facility
- Australian Centre for Disease Preparedness – High-security laboratory for exotic diseases
- Australian Bird and Bat Banding Scheme
- Australian Dung Beetle Project – Scientific research and biological control project
- Australian Space Research Institute
- Backing Australia's Ability
- Biosecurity in Australia
- Cooperative Research Centre – Australian scientific research programme
- Council for Scientific and Industrial Research – Ghana
- Council of Scientific and Industrial Research – Indian Scientific Research and Development Organization
- Council for Scientific and Industrial Research – South African scientific research and development organisation
- CSIRO Oceans and Atmosphere – Australian research organisation, 2014–2022
- CSIRO Publishing – Australian science publisher
- Defence Science and Technology Group – Group within the Australian Department of Defence
- Fraunhofer Society – Research organization
- George Bornemissza – Hungarian–Australian entomologist
- Goyder Institute for Water Research — a research collaboration with universities and SA government
- Parkes Observatory – Radio telescope observatory in New South Wales, Australia
- Peter Rathjen – Australian medical researcher
- Thorburn Brailsford Robertson – Australian physiologist, biochemist, gerontologist, and animal nutritionist
- SINTEF – Norwegian research organization
- Susan Wijffels – Australian oceanographer (born 1965)
- Netherlands Organisation for Applied Scientific Research – Dutch organisation
- Waste management in Australia
- Yingjie Jay Guo
