= Liversidge =

Liversidge or Liversedge is an uncommon surname of English origin. It probably derives from Liversedge, a town in West Yorkshire. Notable people with the surname include:

- Archibald Liversidge (1846–1927), Australian chemist
- Joan Liversidge (1914–1984), British archaeologist
- Pamela Liversidge (born 1949), English mechanical engineer
- Richard Liversidge (1926–2003), South African naturalist
- Robert Liversidge (1904–1994), British Jewish businessman
- Sydney Liversedge (1897–1979), English World War I flying ace

== See also ==
- Liversidge v Anderson, a 1942 English court-case
