= Chambers Motors =

Defunct Irish/Northern Irish automobile manufacturing company

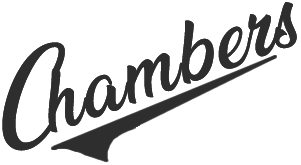
- Founded: 1904; 122 years ago (as Chambers & Co.)
- Defunct: 1929
- Fate: Voluntarily wound up, 1929
- Headquarters: Belfast, Northern Ireland
- Key people: Jack Chambers (Founder), Charlie Chambers (Founder), Robert Chambers (Founder), Charles Hurst (Director)
- Products: Motor Cars, Utility Vehicles, Munitions, Bottling Machines

Chambers Motors was the first automobile manufacturer in Ireland. The company built vehicles by hand featuring high-quality components designed and fabricated in-house. Passenger cars were made to suit doctors and wealthy businessmen, and commercial vehicles were produced for duty as delivery vans, ambulances, and hearses. A key feature of the vehicles was a unique design of epicyclic gearbox in the rear axle. Chambers Motors employed around 73 people and built approximately 500 vehicles in 25 years of operation.

== Origin ==
The founder, Jack Chambers, had earlier designed and constructed the first Vauxhall car in 1902-3 while Managing Director of the Vauxhall Iron Works, London. After resigning in January 1904, he filed a master patent in May 1904 for a Chambers car featuring coil springs and a twin cylinder transverse engine with chain drive.

== Production ==
Production was undertaken in Cuba Street, Belfast, in association with Jack's brothers Robert and Charlie who had been operating as millwrights from 1897. Their main product was an automatic bottle-wiring machine to fasten the corks of mineral-water bottles at the rate of 1200 per hour. Prior to the First World War, the company achieved notable success, particularly with its 12/16 Model, variants of which were built from 1907 to 1925. During this period of success, Chambers vehicles won several awards in IAC and SMMT reliability and hill climbing trials, while vehicles were exported as far as Australia, the British Raj and the United States. During the Great War, the company initially produced several ambulances for the military, however regulations were put in place that required a greater engine power than Chambers engines could provide and an initial supply of 6 ambulances were all that were produced. With no military orders for vehicles and massively reduced civilian demand, the company turned to munitions (such as shell cases and percussion caps for hand grenades), and aircraft components (for Avro 504 biplanes).

== Closure ==
The production of munitions and aircraft components, equipment that Chambers was not properly equipped to carry out, resulted in much of its factory equipment becoming worn out. In addition to these problems, two new engine prototype projects turned out to be failures, leaving the company with its ageing pre-war engine designs as its only viable products until 1925. Expensive retooling, a growing reliance on other manufacturers for components and increasing competition from mass-produced cars eventually lead to the operation being voluntarily wound up in 1929. Only four Chambers cars are known to exist today, including an 8 hp model from 1908 which is displayed in the Ulster Museum in Belfast.

== Specifications of Chambers cars ==
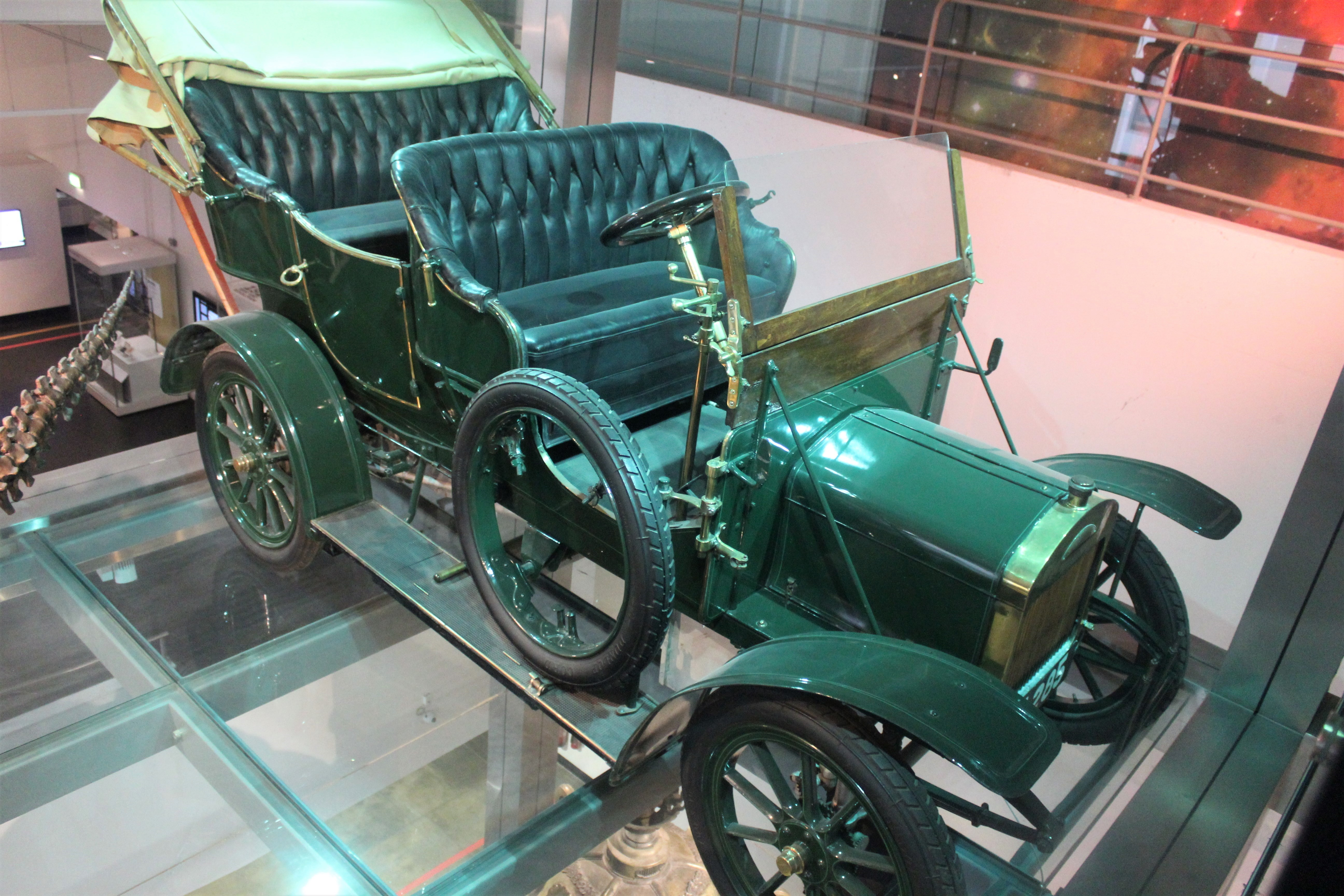
1908 8 hp Chambers Motors vehicle at the Ulster Museum

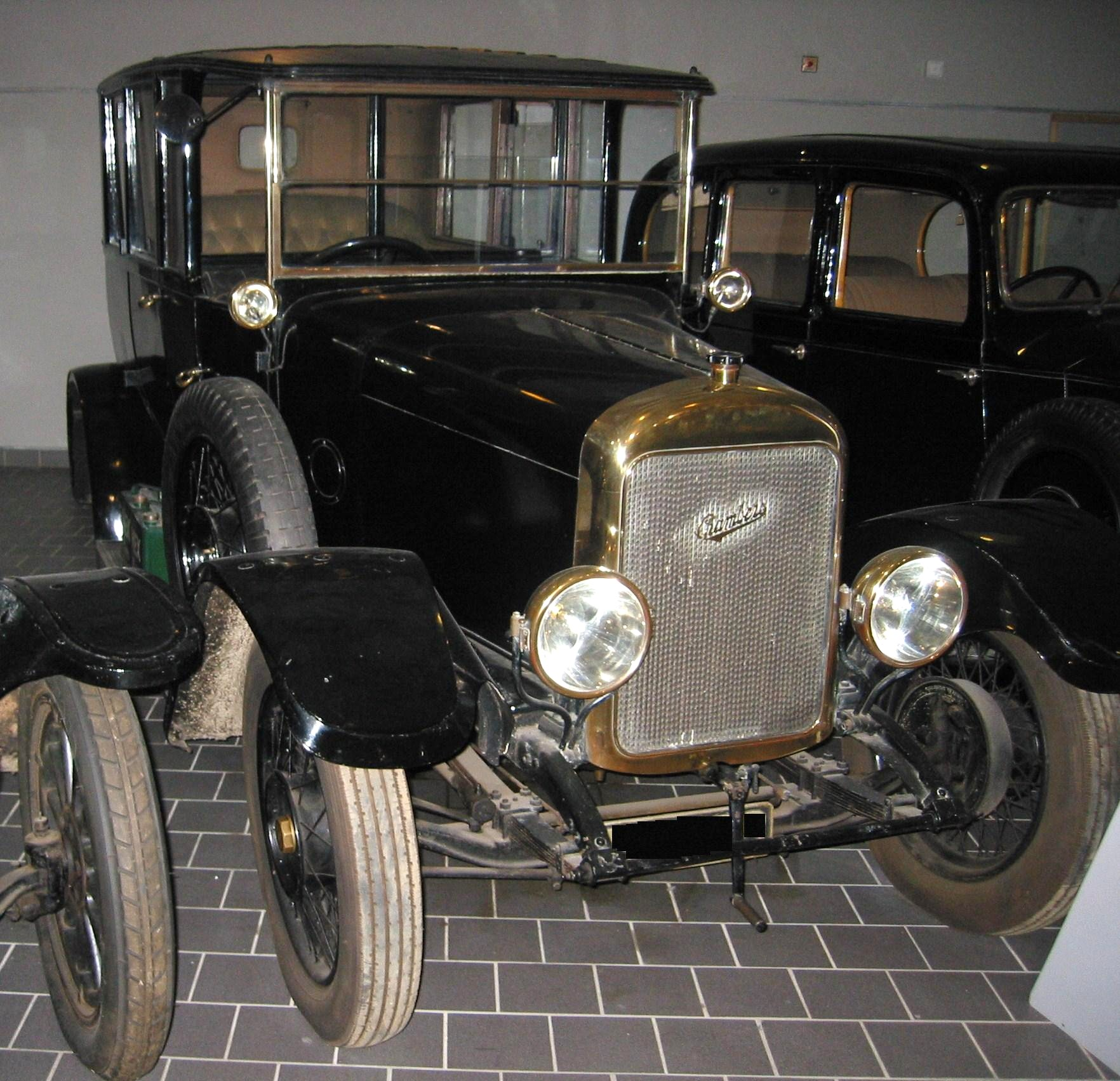
1925 Chambers at the Ulster Folk and Transport Museum

Chambers cars competed in many hill-climb, reliability, and time trials. In the Irish Reliability Trial of 1906 during non-stop runs an average petrol consumption of 43 mpg_{‑imp} (6.6 L/100 km; 36 mpg_{‑US}) was achieved.

Model	Years	Cylinders	Engine orientation	Bore	Stroke	Wheelbase	Track	Feature
7 hp	1904–1905	Two	Horizontal	3 1/8 in (79 mm)	4 1/4 in (110 mm)	6 ft 6 in (1.98 m)	4 ft (1.2 m)	
8 hp	1905–1909	Two	Horizontal	3 1/8 in (79 mm)	4 1/4 in (110 mm)	6 ft 6 in (1.98 m)	4 ft (1.2 m)	
10 hp	1906–1909	Two	Horizontal	3 3/4 in (95 mm)	4 1/2 in (110 mm)	7 ft (2.1 m)	4 ft (1.2 m)	
10-12 hp	1908–1909	Two	Horizontal	4 in (100 mm)	4 1/2 in (110 mm)	7 ft (2.1 m)	4 ft (1.2 m)	
12-16 hp	1907–1909	Two	Horizontal	3 3/8 in (86 mm)	4 1/4 in (110 mm)	8 ft 6 in (2.59 m)	4 ft (1.2 m)	
12-14 hp	1909	Four	Vertical	85 mm	4 in (100 mm)	8 ft (2.4 m)	4 ft (1.2 m)	
12-16 hp	1910–1924	Four	Vertical	3 3/8 in (86 mm)	4 in (100 mm)	9 ft 6 in (2.90 m)	4 ft 3 in (1.30 m)	
11-15 hp	1912–1924	Four	Vertical	3 1/8 in (79 mm)	4 in (100 mm)	8 ft 3 in (2.51 m)	4 ft (1.2 m)	
11-15 hp	1919–1924	Four	Vertical	3 1/3 in (85 mm)	4 in (100 mm)	8 ft 6 in (2.59 m)	4 ft (1.2 m)	Sliding gear gearbox
14/34	1925	Four	Vertical	2 15/16 in (75 mm)	4 in (100 mm)	9 ft 6 in (2.90 m)	4 ft 3 in (1.30 m)	Sliding gear gearbox
18/48	1925–1929	Six	Vertical	2 11/16 in (68 mm)	4 in (100 mm)	10 ft 6 in (3.20 m)	4 ft 8 in (1.42 m)	

== See also ==
- List of car manufacturers of the United Kingdom
