= Harry Julius Emeléus =

English inorganic chemist (1903–93)

Harry Julius Emeléus CBE, FRS
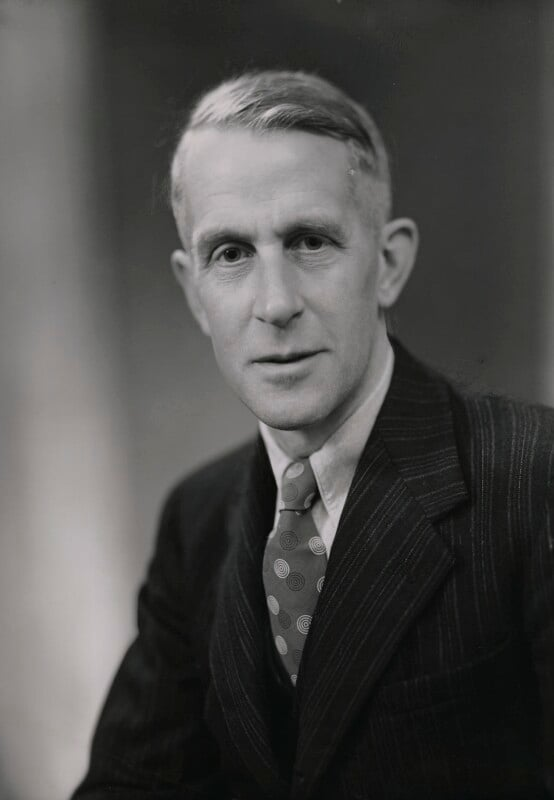
- Emeléus in 1950
- Born: 22 June 1903; Poplar, London
- Died: 2 December 1993 (aged 90); Addenbrooke's Hospital, Cambridge
- Education: Hastings Grammar School, Royal College of Science, Imperial College, London
- Relatives: Karl George Emeléus (brother)
- Awards: Edward Harrison Memorial Prize, Liversidge Award, Alfred Stock Memorial Prize, Henri Moissan prize, Lavoisier Medal
- Scientific career
- Fields: Inorganic chemistry
- Workplaces: Cambridge University, University of Karlsruhe, Princeton University
- Academic advisors: Alfred Stock, Hugh Stott Taylor
- Notable students: Norman Greenwood, Ken McTaggart, F. Gordon A. Stone

Harry Julius Emeléus CBE, FRS (22 June 1903 – 2 December 1993) was an English inorganic chemist and a professor in the department of chemistry, Cambridge University.

== Early life ==
Emeléus was born in Poplar, London on 22 June 1903, the son of Karl Henry Emeléus (1869–1948), a pharmacist who was born in Vaasa, Finland. The family moved to the Old Pharmacy in Battle, Sussex shortly after Emeléus was born. His elder brother Karl George Emeléus (1901–1989) went on to become professor of physics at the Queen's University of Belfast.

Emeléus was educated at St Leonards Collegiate School, Hastings, and Hastings Grammar School followed by the Royal College of Science, Imperial College, London, graduating in 1923. He gained his PhD in 1926 and a DSc three years later. During his post-graduate studies he spent time at the University of Karlsruhe as a student of Alfred Stock and two years at Princeton University with Professor Hugh Stott Taylor. Among his many students and research colleagues, notable are Norman Greenwood, Ken McTaggart and F. Gordon A. Stone.

== Career ==
Emeléus served as president of the inorganic chemistry division of the International Union of Pure and Applied Chemistry (1955–60). He was also president of the Chemical Society (1958–60) and of the Royal Institute of Chemistry (1963–5).

== Awards ==
- Edward Harrison Memorial Prize (1932)
- Tilden Lecture to the Chemical Society (1942)
- Fellow of the Royal Society (1946)
- Liversidge Award (1954)
- Alfred Stock Memorial Prize and medal of the Gesellschaft Deutscher Chemiker (1954)
- Commander of the Order of the British Empire (1958)
- Davy Medal of the Royal Society (1962)
- Henri Moissan prize for fluorine chemistry, Germany (1991)
- Lavoisier Medal of the Société Chimique de France (French Chemical Society)

== Death ==
Emeléus died of heart failure at Addenbrooke's Hospital, Cambridge, on 2 December 1993. He was survived by his four children, his wife having predeceased him in January 1991.
