= Ingold =

Ingold may refer to:

== People ==
- Cecil Terence Ingold (1905–2010), British botanist and mycologist
- Christopher Kelk Ingold (1893–1970), British chemist
- Jeff Ingold, current president of Doozer Production Company and the former head of comedy at NBC
- Jon Ingold (born 1981), British author of interactive fiction
- Karl Ingold (?–?), US-American aviator
- Keith Usherwood Ingold (1929–2023), British chemist
- Mariana Ingold (born 1958), Uruguayan composer
- Res Ingold (born 1954), Swiss contemporary artist. He is known for his superfiction airline company Ingold Airlines
- Rich Ingold (1963–2017), US-American football player
- Tim Ingold (born 1948), British anthropologist
- Werner Ingold (1919–1995), Swiss chemist and entrepreneur
- Ingold Baardson
- Ingold Haraldrsson
- Ingold II
- Ingold Illready
- Ingold Steinkelsson
- Ingold of Sweden (disambiguation)

== Places ==
- Ingold, North Carolina

== Science ==
- Thorpe–Ingold effect, an effect observed in organic chemistry where increasing the size of two substituents on a tetrahedral center leads to enhanced reactions between parts of the other two substituents
