= Martha Annie Whiteley =

English chemist

Martha Annie Whiteley OBE, FCS
- Born: 11 November 1866; Chelsea, London, England
- Died: 24 May 1956 (aged 89); London, England
- Education: Royal College of Science
- Awards: D.Sc. from the University of London and OBE in 1920
- Scientific career
- Fields: Chemistry
- Workplaces: Imperial College
- Doctoral advisor: William A. Tilden
- Doctoral students: Edith Hilda Usherwood

Martha Annie Whiteley (11 November 1866 – 24 May 1956) was an English chemist and mathematician. She was instrumental in advocating for women's entry into the Chemical Society, and was best known for her dedication to advancing women's equality in the field of chemistry. She is identified as one of the Royal Society of Chemistry's 175 Faces of Chemistry.

== Biography ==
Whiteley was born on 11 November 1866, in Chelsea, London, England, to William Sedgewick Whiteley and Hannah Bargh. Her mother died in the 1870s, after which her father remarried Mary Bargh Turner Clark in 1880.

== Education ==
Whiteley began her education at Kensington High School, London, a Girls Public Day School Trust school. The Girls' Public Day School Trust provided affordable day school education for girls. She continued her education as one of the first 28 students at Royal Holloway College for Women (London), where she graduated in 1890 with a B.Sc. in chemistry from the University of London. She remained at the Royal Holloway College for Women to obtain an honor undergraduate degree in mathematical moderations from the University of Oxford.

Between 1891 and 1900, Whiteley was science mistress at Wimbledon High School and for the next 2 years, science lecturer at St Gabriel's Training College, Camberwell. During 1898–1902 she was doing research on the organic chemistry of barbiturate compounds at the Royal College of Science.

Whiteley's research, working with Professor Sir William Tilden, helped her achieve a doctorate degree (D.Sc.) in 1902 from the Royal College of Science (later part of Imperial College). Her dissertation was on the preparation and properties of amides and oximes. At the same time, she worked part-time as a science lecturer at St Gabriel's Training College in Camberwell, a college for female teachers.

== University career ==
After completion of her doctorate in 1902, Whiteley was invited by Tilden to join the staff at the College of Science, and was one of only two female professional staff when the college merged with the newly formed Imperial College in 1907. She was the first woman to become a Reader in Imperial College.

In 1912, Whiteley founded the Imperial College Women's Association upon recommendation from rector Sir Alfred Keogh. This association helped women of the college strive for equal treatment in the field of chemistry.

Whiteley retired from Imperial College in 1934, but continued work in editing and contributing to Thorpe's Dictionary of Applied Chemistry with her co-author Jocelyn Field Thorpe. After Jocelyn Field Thorpe died in 1939, Whiteley became the principal editor of twelve volumes of the fourth edition of Thorpe's Dictionary of Applied Chemistry. She completed her contributions at the age of 88 in 1954.

Whiteley's life and works are described in a detailed chapter in the 2011 publication on European Women in Chemistry.

== War work ==
During World War One, the chemical laboratories at the Imperial College were utilized to analyze samples collected from battlefields and areas that had been bombed. She and her colleagues focused on analyzing lachrymators and irritants. Whiteley worked with Frances Micklethwait and 6 other female scientists in an experimental trench at Imperial College testing mustard gas and explosives. The work was hazardous: Whitely wounded her arm whilst testing mustard gas on herself. She also worked on developing syntheses of drugs that had previously been imported from Germany including beta-Eucaine, Phenacetin and Procaine.

In 1920, Whiteley received the honor of the Order of British Empire for her scientific contributions to war efforts.

An earlier biography by Mary R.S. Creese of the University of Kansas was published in 1997 in the American Chemical Society's Bulletin for the History of Chemistry, and references what appears to be an obituary published 40 years previously in the year after Whiteley's death.

== Contributions to women in science ==
Whiteley was well known for her contributions to women's equality in the field of chemistry. Prior to establishing the Imperial College Women's Association in 1912, Whiteley fought for cloakroom facility updates for female staff and students in all academic departments.

In 1904, she advocated with 19 other women for women's admittance into the Fellowship of the Chemical Society in London. At first the women were unsuccessful, but in 1908 current fellows voted in favor of admitting women into the Chemical Society. However, the women did not gain full admittance until 1920 after the Sex Disqualification (Removal) Act of 1919 was passed. After joining the society, Whiteley worked with Ida Smedley Maclean in founding the Women's Dining Club of the Chemical Society.

Whiteley became the first female elected member of the Chemical Society's Council.

== See also ==
- Timeline of women in science
