= Thorpe reaction =

Chemical reaction

The Thorpe reaction is a chemical reaction described as a self-condensation of aliphatic nitriles catalyzed by base to form enamines. The reaction was discovered by Jocelyn Field Thorpe.

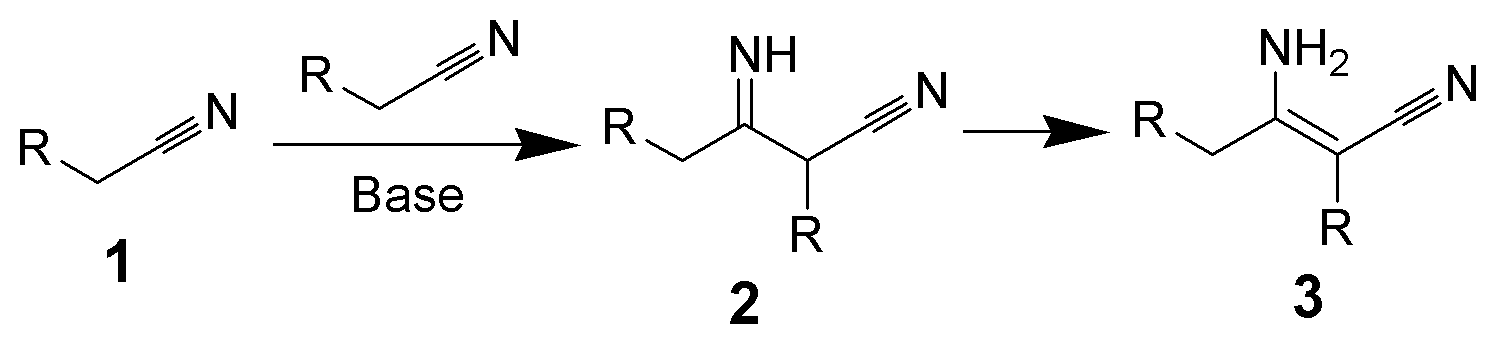
The Thorpe reaction

== Thorpe–Ziegler reaction ==
The Thorpe–Ziegler reaction (named after Jocelyn Field Thorpe and Karl Ziegler), or Ziegler method, is the intramolecular modification with a dinitrile as a reactant and a cyclic ketone as the final reaction product after acidic hydrolysis. The reaction is conceptually related to the Dieckmann condensation.

The reaction mechanism of the Thorpe–Ziegler reaction
