= Peter de la Mare (chemist) =

Academic chemist in New Zealand

- Born: Peter Bernard David de la Mare; 3 September 1920; Hamilton, New Zealand
- Died: 13 December 1989 (aged 69); Ōpōtiki, New Zealand
- Education: Victoria University College; University College London
- Relatives: Frederick de la Mare (father)
- Awards: Hector Medal (1985)
- Scientific career
- Fields: Physical organic chemistry
- Workplaces: DSIR (New Zealand); University College London; Bedford College, University of London; University of Auckland
- Thesis: Steric and polar effects in the halogen exchange reaction (1948)
- Doctoral advisor: Christopher Ingold
- Other academic advisors: Philip Robertson

Peter Bernard David de la Mare (3 September 1920 – 13 December 1989) was a New Zealand physical organic chemist.

Born in Hamilton in 1920, he was the son of Sophia Ruth de la Mare (née Child), a medical practitioner, and Frederick Archibald de la Mare, a lawyer. He was educated at Hamilton High School, and then attended Victoria University College, from where he graduated in 1942 with an MSc in chemistry, winning the Shirtcliffe Fellowship and the Jacob Joseph Scholarship. His master's research was supervised by Philip Robertson. He worked at the Department of Scientific and Industrial Research in the agricultural department at Wellington and Ruakura, before undertaking PhD studies at University College London between 1946 and 1948, supervised by Christopher Ingold.

He was appointed as an assistant lecturer in the University College London department of chemistry in 1948, and was promoted to lecturer in 1949 and reader in 1957. In 1960 he moved to Bedford College, University of London, becoming professor and head of chemistry. He was appointed professor and head of chemistry at the University of Auckland in 1967, stepping down as head of department in 1980 and retiring in 1981.

De la Mare was awarded a DSc by thesis from the University of London in 1955. He was elected a Fellow of the Royal Society of New Zealand in 1970, and in 1985 he won the society's Hector Medal, then the highest award in New Zealand science. In 1983 he was awarded an honorary DSc by Victoria University of Wellington.
