= Georg Wittig =

German chemist (1897–1987)

- Born: 16 June 1897; Berlin, German Empire
- Died: 26 August 1987 (aged 90); Heidelberg, West Germany
- Education: University of Marburg
- Known for: Wittig reaction 1,2-Wittig rearrangement 2,3-Wittig rearrangement Directed ortho metalation Ate complex Hypervalent molecule Potassium tetraphenylborate
- Awards: Otto Hahn Prize for Chemistry and Physics (1967); Paul Karrer Gold Medal (1972); Nobel Prize in Chemistry (1979)
- Scientific career
- Fields: Chemistry
- Workplaces: University of Marburg; TU Braunschweig; University of Freiburg; University of Tübingen; University of Heidelberg
- Doctoral advisor: Karl von Auwers
- Doctoral students: Werner Tochtermann, Ulrich Schöllkopf

Georg Wittig (German: [ˈɡeː.ɔʁk ˈvɪ.tɪç]; 16 June 1897 – 26 August 1987) was a German chemist who reported a method for synthesis of alkenes from aldehydes and ketones using compounds called phosphonium ylides in the Wittig reaction. He shared the Nobel Prize in Chemistry with Herbert C. Brown in 1979.

== Biography ==
Wittig was born in Berlin, Germany; shortly after his birth moved with his family to Kassel, where his father was professor at the applied arts high school. He attended school in Kassel and started studying chemistry at the University of Tübingen 1916. He was drafted and became a lieutenant in the cavalry of Hesse-Kassel (or Hesse-Cassel). After being an Allied prisoner of war from 1918 until 1919, Wittig found it hard to restart his chemistry studies owing to overcrowding at the universities. By a direct plea to Karl von Auwers, who was professor for organic chemistry at the University of Marburg at the time, he was able to resume university study and after three years was awarded the Ph.D. in organic chemistry.

Karl von Auwers was able to convince him to start an academic career, leading to his habilitation in 1926. He became a close friend of Karl Ziegler, who was also doing his habilitation with Auwers during that time. The successor of Karl von Auwers, Hans Meerwein, accepted Wittig as lecturer, partly because he was impressed by the new 400-page book on stereochemistry that Wittig had written. In 1931 Wittig married Waltraud Ernst, a colleague from the Auwers working group. The invitation of Karl Fries brought him as professor to the TU Braunschweig in 1932. The time in Braunschweig became more and more problematic as the Nazis tried to get rid of Karl Fries and Wittig showed solidarity with him. After the forced retirement of Fries, in 1937 Hermann Staudinger offered Wittig a position at the University of Freiburg, partly because he knew Wittig from his book on stereochemistry in which he supported Staudinger's highly criticized theory of macromolecules. The foundations of carbanion chemistry were laid during Wittig's time in Freiburg.

In 1944 he succeeded the head of the organic chemistry department Wilhelm Schlenk at the University of Tübingen. Most of his scientific work, including the development of the Wittig reaction, was performed during this time in Tübingen. The 1956 appointment of the nearly sixty-year-old Wittig as head of the organic chemistry department at the University of Heidelberg as successor of Karl Freudenberg was exceptional even at that time. The newly built department and the close connection to the BASF convinced Wittig to take this opportunity. He worked at the University of Heidelberg even after his retirement in 1967 and published papers until 1980. Most of his awards were presented during this time at Heidelberg, such as the honorary doctorate of the Sorbonne in 1956 and the Nobel Prize in Chemistry in 1979.

== Work ==
Wittig's contributions also include the preparation of phenyllithium and the discovery of the 1,2-Wittig rearrangement and the 2,3-Wittig rearrangement.

Wittig was well known in the chemistry community for being a consummate experimenter and observer of chemical transformations, while caring very little for the theoretical and mechanistic underpinnings of the work he produced.
