= Karl Ziegler =

German chemist (1898–1973)

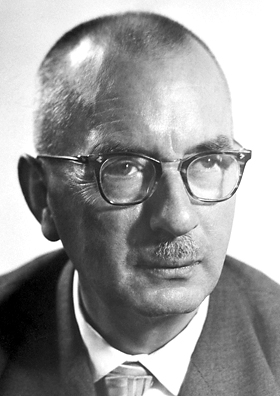
- Karl Ziegler
- Born: Karl Waldemar Ziegler; 26 November 1898; Helsa near Kassel, German Empire
- Died: 12 August 1973 (aged 74); Mülheim, West Germany
- Education: University of Marburg
- Known for: Ziegler process Ziegler–Natta catalyst Wohl–Ziegler bromination Thorpe–Ziegler reaction Dienone–phenol rearrangement Organoaluminium chemistry Organolithium reagent Synthesis of ascaridole
- Awards: Liebig Medal (1935); War Merit Cross 2nd Class (1940); Werner von Siemens Ring (1961); Nobel Prize for Chemistry (1963); Pour le Mérite (1969); FRS (1971)
- Scientific career
- Fields: Organic chemistry
- Workplaces: Goethe University Frankfurt; University of Heidelberg; University of Halle-Saale; Max Planck Institute für Kohlenforschung; University of Chicago
- Doctoral advisor: Karl von Auwers

Karl Waldemar Ziegler (German: [kaːʁl ˈvaldəˌmaʁ ˈt͡siːɡlɐ]; 26 November 1898 – 12 August 1973) was a German chemist who won the Nobel Prize in Chemistry in 1963, with Giulio Natta, for work on polymers. The Nobel Committee recognized his "excellent work on organometallic compounds [which]...led to new polymerization reactions and ... paved the way for new and highly useful industrial processes". He is also known for his work involving free-radicals, many-membered rings, and organometallic compounds, as well as the development of Ziegler–Natta catalyst. One of many awards Ziegler received was the Werner von Siemens Ring in 1960 jointly with Otto Bayer and Walter Reppe, for expanding the scientific knowledge of and the technical development of new synthetic materials.

== Biography ==
=== Early life and education ===
Karl Ziegler was born on 26 November 1898 in Helsa near Kassel, Germany and was the second son of Karl Ziegler, a Lutheran minister, and Luise Rall Ziegler. He attended Kassel-Bettenhausen in elementary school. An introductory physics textbook first sparked Ziegler's interest in science. It drove him to perform experiments in his home and to read extensively beyond his high school curriculum. He was also introduced to many notable individuals through his father, including Emil Adolf von Behring, recognized for the diphtheria vaccine. His extra study and experimentation help explain why he received an award for most outstanding student in his final year at high school in Kassel, Germany. He studied at the University of Marburg and was able to omit his first two semesters of study due to his extensive background knowledge. His studies were interrupted however, as during 1918 he was deployed to the front as a soldier to serve in World War I. He received his Ph.D. in 1920, studying under Karl von Auwers. His dissertation was on "Studies on semibenzole and related compounds" which led to three publications.

=== Career ===
Karl Ziegler showed an eagerness for science at an early age. He progressed through schooling quickly receiving a doctorate from the University of Marburg in 1920. Soon after, he briefly lectured at the University of Marburg and the University of Frankfurt.

In 1926 he became a professor at the University of Heidelberg where he spent the next ten years researching new advances in organic chemistry. He investigated the stability of radicals on trivalent carbons leading him to study organometallic compounds and their application in his research. He also worked on the syntheses of multi-membered ring systems. In 1933 Ziegler published his first major work on large ring systems, "Vielgliedrige Ringsysteme" which presented the fundamentals for the Ruggli-Ziegler dilution principle.

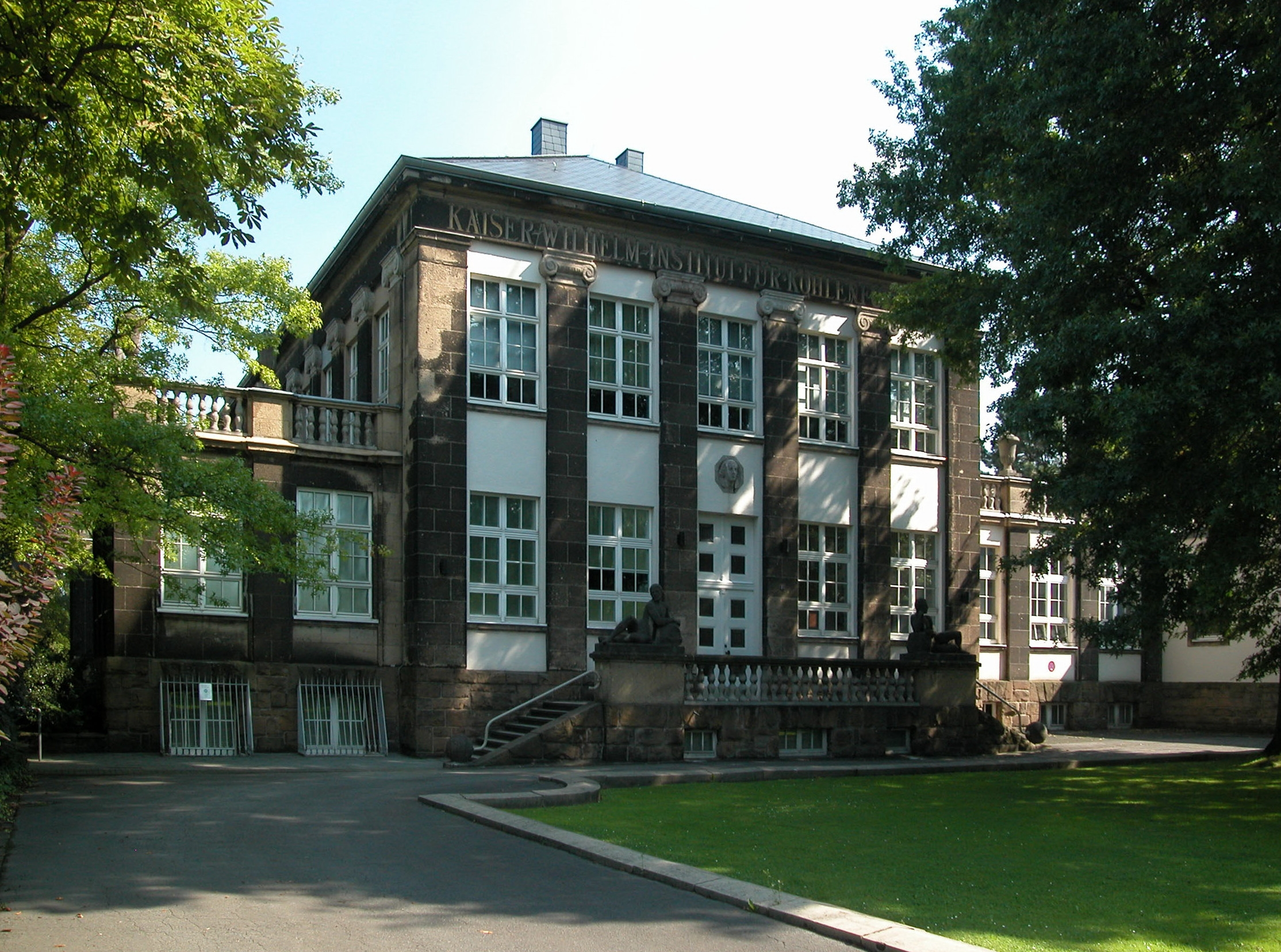
Max Planck Institute for Coal Research.

In 1936 he became Professor and Director of the Chemical Institute (Chemisches Institut) at the University of Halle-Saale and was also a visiting lecturer at the University of Chicago. Ziegler, who was a Patron Member of the SS received the War Merit Cross 2nd Class in October 1940.

From 1943 until 1969, Ziegler was the Director of the Max Planck Institute for Coal Research (Max-Planck-Institut fur Kohlenforschung) formerly known as the Kaiser-Wilhelm Institute for Coal Research (Kaiser-Wilhelm-Institut fur Kohlenforschung) in Mülheim an der Ruhr as a successor to Franz Fischer.

Karl Ziegler was credited with much of the postwar resurrection of chemical research in Germany and helped found the German Chemical Society (Gesellschaft Deutscher Chemiker) in 1949. He served as president for five years. He was also the president of the German Society for Petroleum Science and Coal Chemistry (Deutsche Gesellschaft für Mineralölwissenschaft und Kohlechemie), from 1954 to 1957. In 1971, The Royal Society, London, elected him as a Foreign Member.

== Personal life ==
In 1922, Ziegler married Maria Kurtz. They had two children, Erhart and Marianna. His daughter, Dr. Marianna Ziegler Witte was a doctor of medicine and married a chief physical of a children's hospital (at that time) in the Ruhr. His son, Dr. Erhart Ziegler, became a physicist and patent attorney. In addition to his children, Karl Ziegler has five grandchildren by his daughter, and five by his son. At least one of his grandchildren, Cordula Witte, attended his Nobel Prize reception as there is a picture of the two of them happily dancing. Ziegler enjoyed traveling around the world with his family, especially on cruises. He even charted special cruises and airplanes for eclipse viewing. It was during a 1972 eclipse-viewing cruise with his grandson that Karl Ziegler became ill. He died a year later.

Ziegler and his wife were great lovers of the arts, particularly paintings. Karl and Maria would present each other with paintings for birthdays, Christmases, and anniversaries. They amassed a large collection of paintings, not necessarily of one particular period, but of paintings they enjoyed. Maria, being an avid gardener, particularly enjoyed flower paintings by Emil Nolde, Erich Heckel, Oskar Kokoschka, and Karl Schmidt-Rottluff. Karl enjoyed pictures of the places that he and his wife called home, including pictures of Halle and the Ruhr valley. Forty-two images from their shared collection were incorporated into a foundation, bequeathed to the Mülheim Ziegler Art Museum.

As a man of many discoveries, Karl Ziegler was also a man of many patents. As a result of his patent agreement with the Max Planck Institute, Ziegler was a wealthy man. With part of this wealth, he set up the Ziegler Fund with some 40 million deutsche marks to support the institute's research. Another namesake is the Karl-Ziegler-Schule, an urban high school that was founded on 4 December 1974, renaming a previously existing school. The school is located in Mülheim, Germany.

Karl Ziegler died in Mülheim, Germany on 12 August 1973; his wife died in 1980.

== Scientific advancements ==
Throughout his life, Ziegler was a zealous advocate for the necessary indivisibility of all kinds of research. Because of this, his scientific achievements range from the fundamental to the most practical, and his research spans a wide range of topics within the field of chemistry. As a young professor, Ziegler posed the question: what factors contribute to the dissociation of carbon-carbon bonds in substituted ethane derivatives? This question was to lead Ziegler on to a study of free radicals, organometallics, ring compounds, and, finally, polymerization processes.

=== Free radical compounds ===
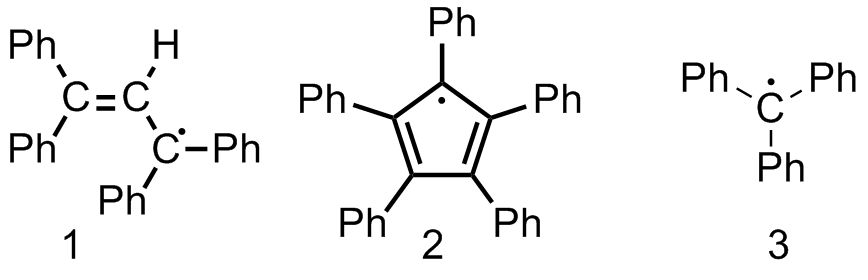
Example of three tri-valent carbon free radicals. 1. 1,2,4,5-tetraphenylallyl. 2. pentaphenylcyclopentadienyl. 3. triphenylmethyl.

While still a doctoral student at University of Marburg, Ziegler published his first major article which showed how halochromic (R_{3}C^{+}Z^{−}) salts could be made from carbinols. Previous work had left the impression that halochromic salts or free radicals (R3C•) required R to be aromatic. He was encouraged to try to synthesize similarly substituted free radicals, and successfully prepared 1,2,4,5-tetraphenylallyl in 1923 and pentaphenylcyclopentadienyl in 1925. These two compounds were much more stable than previous tri-valent carbon free radicals, such as triphenylmethyl. His interest in the stability of tri-valent carbon free-radical compounds brought him to publish the first of many publications in which he sought to identify the steric and electronic factors responsible for the dissociation of hexa-substituted ethane derivatives.

=== Many-membered ring compounds ===
Ziegler's work with many-membered ring compounds also utilized the reactive nature of alkali metal compounds. He used strong bases such as the lithium and sodium salts of amines, to accomplish the cyclization of long-chain hydrocarbons possessing terminal cyano groups. The initially formed ring compound was then converted to the desired macrocyclic ketone product. Ziegler's synthetic method, which included running reactions at high dilution to favor the intramolecular cyclization over competing intermolecular reactions, resulted in yields superior to those of existing procedures (Laylin): he was able to prepare large-ringed alicyclic ketones, C_{14} to C_{33}, in yields of 60–80%. An outstanding instance of this synthesis was the preparation of muscone, the odiferous principle of animal musk by Leopold Ružička. Ziegler and co-workers published the first of their series of papers on the preparation of large ring systems in 1933. For his work in this area and in free-radical chemistry he was awarded the Liebig Memorial Medal in 1935.

=== Organometallic compounds ===
Ziegler's work with free radicals led him to the organo compounds of the alkali metals. He discovered that ether scission opened a new method of preparing sodium and potassium alkyls, and found that these compounds could easily be converted to the hexa-substituted ethane derivatives. The nature of the substituent could be easily and systematically altered using this synthetic route by simply changing the identity of the ether starting material.

==== Lithium alkyls ====
Later, in 1930, he directly synthesized lithium alkyls and aryls from metallic lithium and halogenated hydrocarbons via metal–halogen exchange. This synthesis reaction spurred numerous studies of RLi reagents by others, and now organolithium reagents are one of the most versatile and valuable tools of the synthetic organic chemist. Ziegler's own research on lithium alkyls and olefins lead directly to his discovery of a new polymerization technique approximately 20 years later.

==== Living polymerization ====
In 1927, he found that when the olefin stilbene was added to an ethyl ether solution of phenylisopropyl potassium, an abrupt color change from red to yellow took place. He had just observed the first addition of an organoalkali metal compound across a carbon-carbon double bond. Further work showed that he could successively add more and more of the olefinic hydrocarbon butadiene to a solution of phenylisopropyl potassium and obtain a long-chain hydrocarbon with the reactive organopotassium end still intact. Oligomers such as these were the forerunners of the so-called "living polymers".

==== Polyethylene ====
Since Ziegler was working at the Max Planck Institute for Coal Research, ethylene was readily available as a byproduct from coal gas. Because of this cheap feedstock of ethylene and the relevance to the coal industry, Ziegler began experimenting with ethylene, and made it a goal to synthesize polyethylene of high molecular weight. His attempts were thwarted because a competing elimination reaction kept occurring causing an anomalous result: instead of ethylene being converted into a mixture of higher aluminum alkyls, its dimer, 1-butene, was almost the only product. It was reasoned that a contaminant must have been present to cause this unexpected elimination reaction, and the cause was eventually determined to be traces of nickel salts. Ziegler realized the significance of this finding; if a nickel salt could have such a dramatic influence on the course of an ethylene-aluminum alkyl reaction, then perhaps another metal might delay the elimination reaction. Ziegler and his student H. Breil found that salts of chromium, zirconium, and especially titanium did not promote the R2AlH-elimination but, instead, enormously accelerated the "growth" reaction. Simply passing ethylene, at atmospheric pressure, into a catalytic amount of TiCl3 and Et2AlCl dissolved in a higher alkane led to the prompt deposition of polyethylene. Ziegler was able to obtain high molecular weight polyethylene (MW > 30,000) and, most importantly, to do so at low ethylene pressures. The Ziegler group suddenly had a polymerization procedure for ethylene superior to all existing processes.

==== Ziegler–Natta catalyst ====
In 1952, Ziegler disclosed his catalyst to the Montecatini Company in Italy, for which Giulio Natta was acting as a consultant. Natta denoted this class of catalysts as "Ziegler catalysts" and became extremely interested in their ability and potential to stereoregularly polymerize α-olefins such as propene. Ziegler, meanwhile concentrated mainly on the large-scale production of polyethylene and copolymers of ethylene and propylene. Soon the scientific community was informed of his discovery. Highly crystalline and stereoregular polymers that previously could not be prepared became synthetically feasible. For their work on the controlled polymerization of hydrocarbons through the use of these novel organometallic catalysts, Karl Ziegler and Giulio Natta shared the 1963 Nobel Prize in Chemistry.

== Awards and honours ==
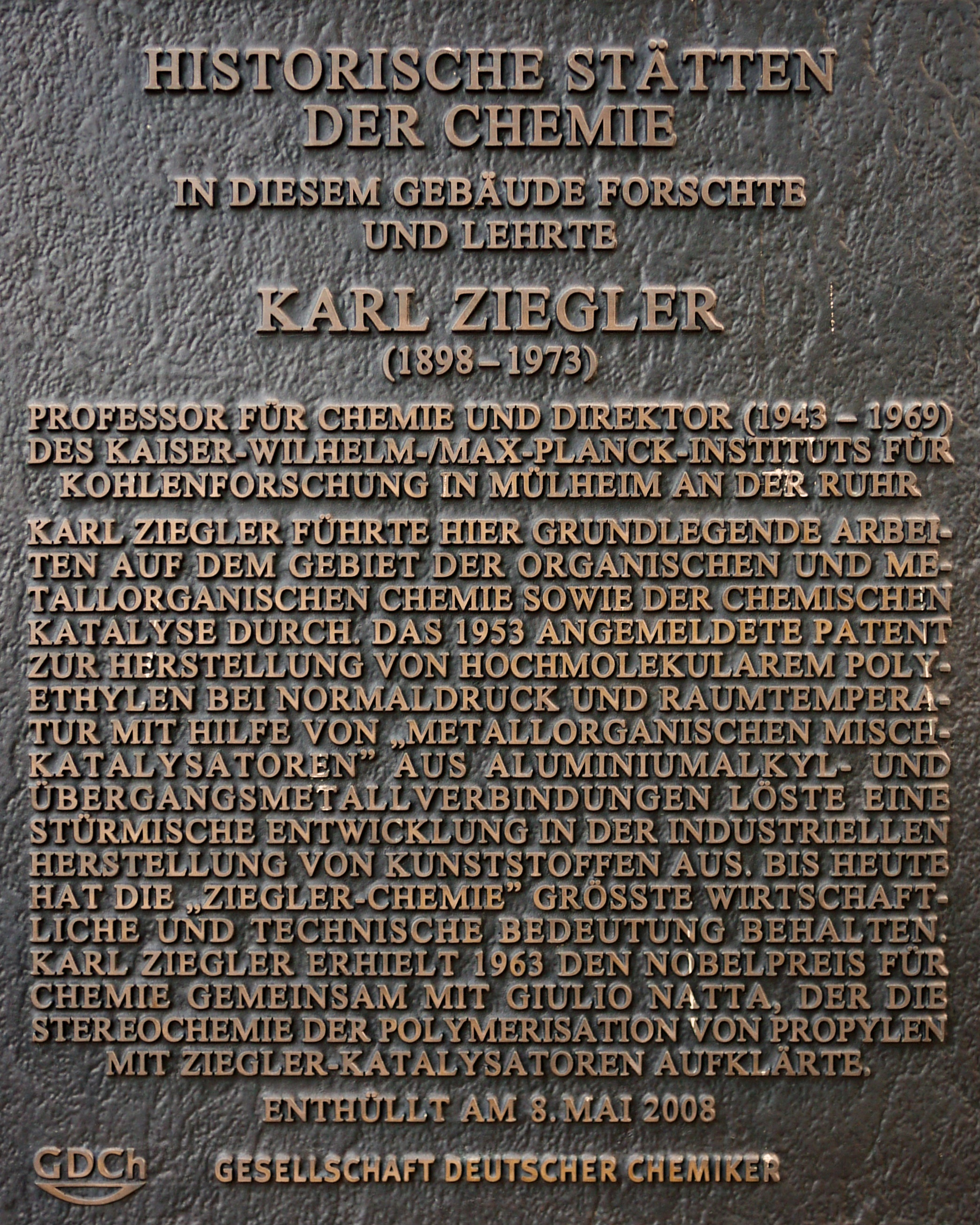
Memorial tablet of the GDCh.

Karl Ziegler received many awards and honors. The following highlights some of the most significant awards:

- Liebig-Denkmünze medal (1935); This medal was awarded by the present day German Chemical Society and is given to a German chemist for their outstanding accomplishments and creativity. Ziegler received the award because of his work in the synthesis of multi-membered ring systems and stable tri-valent carbon radicals.
- War Merit Cross, 2nd class (19 October 1940)
- Carl Duisberg Plakette (1953); This award is given for outstanding service to the promotion of chemistry from the German Chemical Society.
- Lavoisier Medal (1955); This award is given by the French Chemical Society to scientists in various disciplines of chemistry.
- Carl Engler Medal (1958); This award is given by the German Society of Petroleum Science and Coal Chemicals, of which he was the president in earlier years.
- Werner von Siemens Ring (1960); This ring is awarded by the Werner von Siemens Foundation and is considered the highest German award for individuals who by their performance and skills opened up new technological paths.
- Nobel Prize in Chemistry (1963); "[His] excellent work on organometallic compounds has unexpectedly led to new polymerization reactions and thus paved the way for new and highly useful industrial processes."
- Swinburne Medal of the Plastics Institute, London (1964); This award recognizes an individual who has made a significant advancement to the science, engineering or technology of plastics.
- Grand Merit Cross with Star and Sash (Großes Verdienstkreuz mit Stern und Schulterband) of the Federal Republic of Germany (1964)
- International Synthetic Rubber Medal of Rubber and Plastics Age (1967)
- Grand Federal Cross of Merit (Order of Merit of the Federal Republic of Germany)(1969); Ziegler was given this award for his work in the area of Science and Technology.
- Pour le Mérite for Arts and Sciences (formerly Peace Class) (1969)
- Foreign Member of the Royal Society (1971)
- Wilhelm Exner Medal (1971).
- Memorial tablet of the German Chemical Society under the Historic Landmarks of Chemistry program (Historische Stätten der Chemie) at the Max Planck Institute for Coal Research in Mülheim an der Ruhr (2008)
- Honorary doctorates from the Technical University of Hannover, Giessen University, University of Heidelberg and Darmstadt Technical University
- The Karl-Ziegler-Schule in Mülheim was named after Ziegler
- The Karl Ziegler Foundation is located at the German Chemical Society and gives the Science Award, the Karl Ziegler Prize (worth 50,000 euros)

== See also ==
- Dienone–phenol rearrangement
- List of Nobel laureates in Chemistry
