= Karl von Auwers =

German chemist (1863–1939)

Karl Friedrich von Auwers
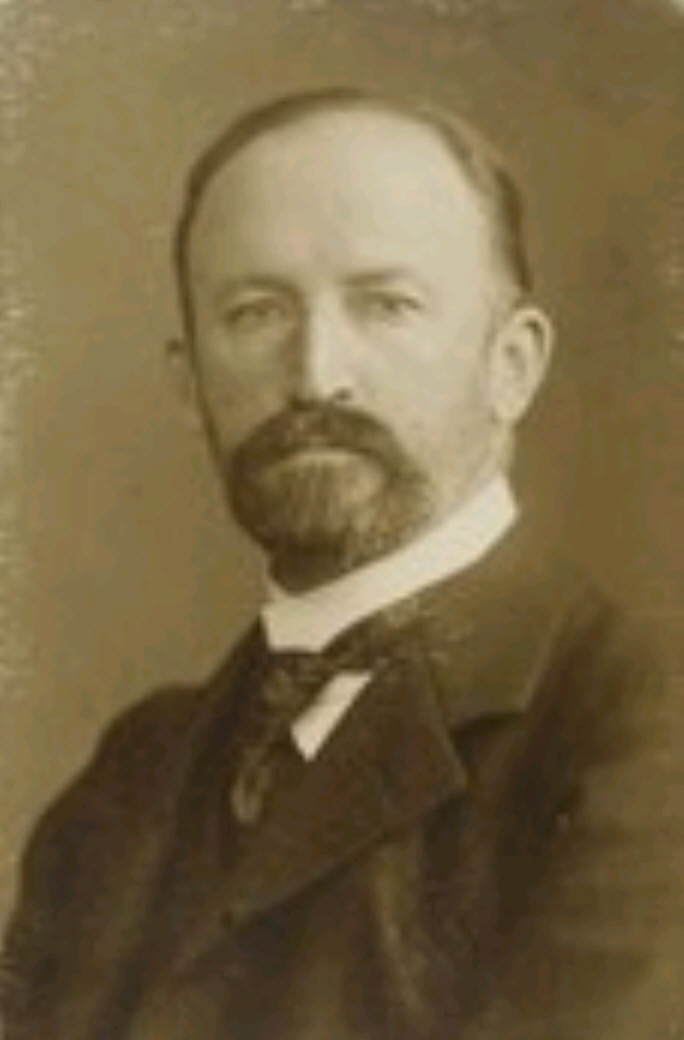
- Karl von Auwers
- Born: September 16, 1863; Gotha, Saxe-Coburg-Gotha
- Died: May 3, 1939 (aged 75); Marburg, Germany
- Education: University of Heidelberg, University of Berlin
- Known for: Auwers synthesis Dienone–phenol rearrangement
- Scientific career
- Workplaces: University of Göttingen, University of Heidelberg, University of Greifswald, University of Marburg
- Doctoral advisor: August Wilhelm von Hofmann, Victor Meyer
- Doctoral students: Karl Ziegler, Georg Wittig, Jocelyn Field Thorpe

Karl Friedrich von Auwers (September 16, 1863 – May 3, 1939) was a German chemist, and was the academic adviser of both Karl Ziegler and Georg Wittig at the University of Marburg.

== Life ==
Karl Friedrich von Auwers was born the son of the astronomer Arthur Auwers on September 16, 1863 in Gotha, Saxe-Coburg-Gotha. He studied first at the University of Heidelberg and later with August Wilhelm von Hofmann at the University of Berlin, where he received his Ph.D. in 1885. After one further year with Hofmann he joined the group of Victor Meyer at the University of Göttingen and later at the University of Heidelberg. He stayed at Heidelberg until he became professor at the University of Greifswald in 1900. He was responsible for the construction of a new chemistry department, of which he chaired. He left in 1913 to become chair of the chemistry department of the University of Marburg where he stayed until his retirement in 1928. Karl von Auwers died on May 3, 1939, in Marburg.

== Sources ==
- Hans Meerwein (1939). "Karl von Auwers 1863–1939". Berichte der Deutschen Chemischen Gesellschaft. 72 (7): A111–A121. doi:10.1002/cber.19390720730.
