= Werner Tochtermann =

German chemist and emeritus professor (1934–2021)

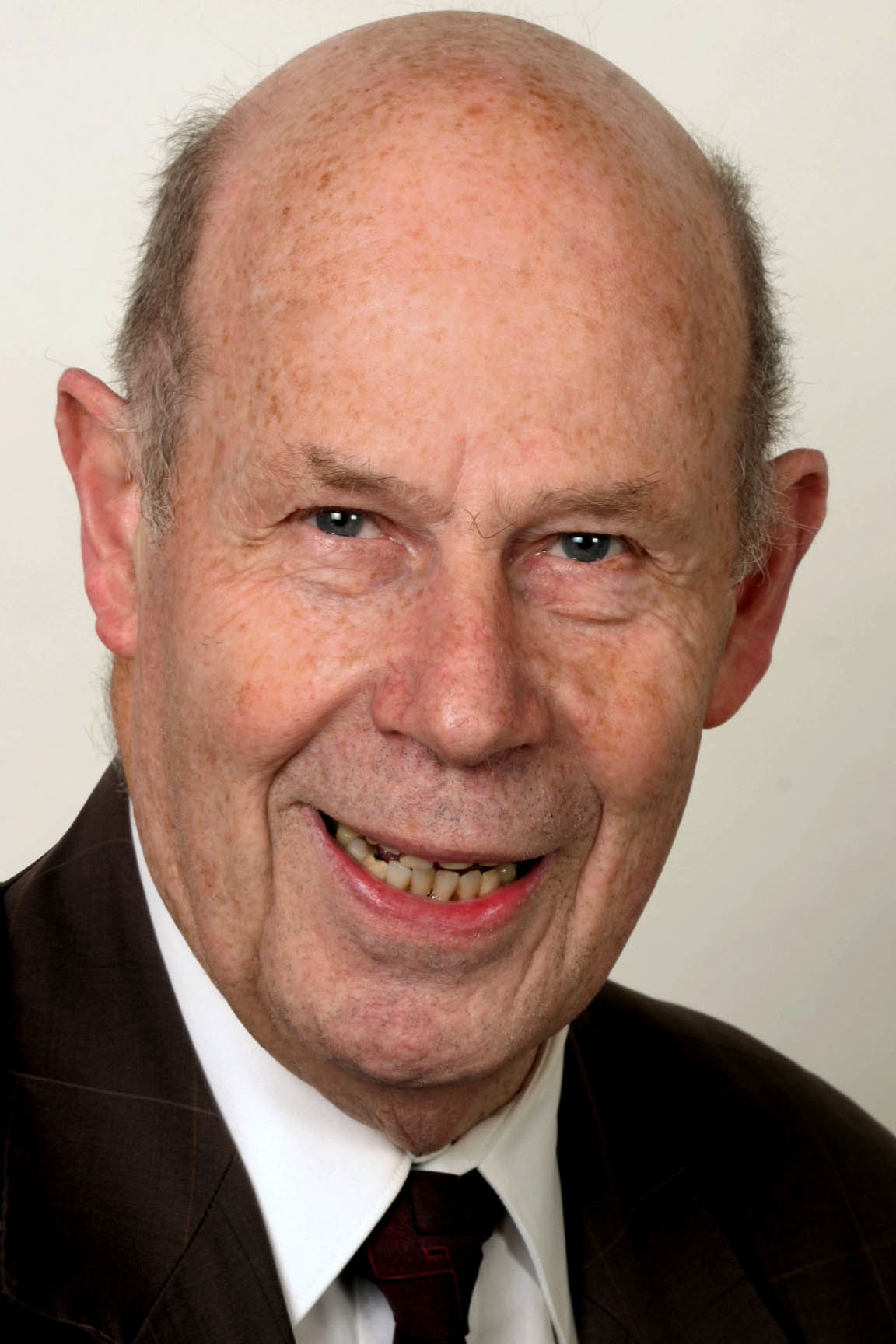
Tochtermann in 2008

Werner Tochtermann (30 May 1934 – 7 August 2021) was a German chemist and emeritus professor. From 1976 till his retirement in 1999 he was full professor of Organic Chemistry at the University of Kiel. His main areas of research were the chemistry of medium and large rings, the synthesis of cyclophanes, and the heteroquadricyclane→heteropin rearrangement, e.g. for the synthesis of oxepins from furans (known as Prinzbach–Tochtermann sequence).

== Career ==
Tochtermann was born in Pforzheim. From 1953–1960, he studied chemistry at the Universities of Münster and Heidelberg, and completed his doctoral dissertation under the direction of the Nobel laureate Georg Wittig. Following a postdoctoral period as assistant to his academic teacher, he started his own research on seven-membered ring systems in 1962. In 1965, he was appointed Privatdozenten at the University of Heidelberg, and joined the faculty at the Darmstadt University of Technology in 1972. From 1976 to his retirement in 1999 he was a full professor at the University of Kiel working on the following areas:

- New routes towards medium and large rings (tailored synthesis of odorants)
- Application of ultrasound in Organic Synthesis (Barbier, Lemieux und Wittig reaction)
- Synthesis of unnatural carbohydrate analogs (bridged deoxyfuranosids and furanoses, disaccharides, nucleosides, glycolipids)
- Stereoselective synthesis of perhydro azulenes (lactaranes, tremulanes, merulanes)
- Strained benzene derivatives (cyclophanes) and ansa compounds
