= Jocelyn Field Thorpe =

British chemist

- Born: 1 December 1872; Clapham, London, England
- Died: 10 June 1940 (aged 67); Cooden Beach, East Sussex, England
- Education: Heidelberg University
- Known for: Thorpe reaction Thorpe–Ingold effect Guareschi–Thorpe condensation
- Awards: Longstaff Prize (1921); Davy Medal (1922)
- Scientific career
- Fields: Organic chemistry
- Workplaces: Imperial College London
- Doctoral advisor: Karl von Auwers
- Doctoral students: Christopher Kelk Ingold

Sir Jocelyn Field Thorpe FRS (1 December 1872 – 10 June 1940) was an English chemist who made major contributions to organic chemistry, including the Thorpe–Ingold effect and three named reactions.

== Early life and education ==
Thorpe was born in Clapham, London on 1 December 1872, one of nine children and the sixth son, of Mr. and Mrs. W.G. Thorpe of the Middle Temple. He attended Worthing College, and then from 1888 - 1890 studied engineering at King's College, London. He then moved to the Royal College of Science from 1890 - 1892 to study chemistry. He earned his Ph.D. in organic chemistry under Karl von Auwers at Heidelberg University in 1895. In 1895 he joined Owens College, Manchester (this became part of the University of Manchester in 1904), starting as an assistant to W. H. Perkin Jr., becoming a lecturer in 1896 and senior lecturer in 1908. In that year he was elected FRS and was awarded a Sorby Fellowship by the Royal Society to study in Sheffield.

== Career and research ==
In 1908 he moved to the University of Sheffield to a full-time research appointment, and in 1913 applied for and was awarded the chair of organic chemistry at Imperial College, a post he was to hold until 1939. The previous incumbent was Thomas Edward Thorpe - although the two were not related, his father was a close friend of T. E. Thorpe and it was the latter who persuaded him to switch from engineering to chemistry in his undergraduate career. Although Ingold's obituary gives a good account of Thorpe's scientific work it lacks references; Patrick Linstead does give some references and on that account is the better source for Thorpe's chemical research career.

With William H. Perkin Jr. at Manchester he worked largely on terpenes (the primary constituents of many essential oils), in particular on camphor and its derivatives. At Imperial College from 1913 he set about a much-needed reorganisation of the organic chemistry department. With the outbreak of war in 1914 he threw himself into war work and proved to be a creative administrator within, amongst others, the Chemical Defence and Trench Warfare committees, and from 1916 to 1922 he served on the Advisory Council to the newly formed and highly influential Department of Scientific and Industrial Research. His chemistry during the war was much concerned with the development of lachrymators and of analgesic agents such as phenacetin and novocaine.

After the war he remained on many committees and was frequently consulted by governmental and industrial bodies. His departmental reorganisations continued, but this postwar period saw much of his best research. With Christopher Kelk Ingold, a demonstrator in the chemistry department from 1920 – 1924, Thorpe worked on 'valence deflection' (sometimes called the Thorpe–Ingold effect). This derives from the observation that increasing the size of two of the substituents at a tetrahedrally-bound carbon atom leads to higher intramolecular reaction rates between parts of the other two substituents.

Three organic reactions bear his name. The Thorpe reaction is a chemical reaction described as a self-condensation of aliphatic nitriles catalyzed by base to form enamines. The Thorpe–Ziegler reaction is the intramolecular modification with a dinitrile as a reactant and a cyclic ketone after acid hydrolysis. In the Guareschi-Thorpe condensation cyanoacetamide reacts with a 1,3-diketone to a 2-pyridone.

== Publications ==
Thorpe wrote many papers, particularly in the Journal of the Chemical Society Transactions; some are cited by Linstead. He also wrote three books, all available in the British Library:

J. C. Cain and J. F. Thorpe, The synthetic dyestuffs and the intermediate products from which they are derived (1905);

C. K. Ingold and J. F. Thorpe, Synthetic colouring matters - vat colours (1923);

J. F. Thorpe and M. Whiteley, A Student's Manual of Organic Chemical Analyses (1925).

In his later years he was part-editor of several volumes of T. T. Thorpe's Dictionary of Applied Chemistry.

== Honours and awards ==
Thorpe became a Fellow of the Royal Society in 1908, was awarded a CBE in 1917, and in the same year became a member of the Officier de la Légion d'honneur. In 1921 he became the vice-president of the Chemical Society and was awarded its Longstaff medal. in 1917. In 1922 he received the Davy Medal of the Royal Society. He became President of the Chemical Society from 1928 - 1931, and was knighted (KBE) in 1939.

== Personality ==
Kon remembered Thorpe as being jovial and full of ideas, never happier than when working in the laboratory, which he normally did in his shirtsleeves without any protective clothing (as famous picture shows him smoking a cigar – he was fond of cigarettes and cigars) while peering through a test-tube. Kon, Linstead and Armstrong remark on his kindness and humanity to others. He was a cultured man with a keen interest in English china. He was well supported in his career by his wife, Alice Lilian née Briggs (1879 – 1967), who he married in 1902.
