= Madelung synthesis =

Organic chemical reaction for producing indoles

Madelung indole synthesis
Named after	Walter Madelung
Reaction type	Ring forming reaction

Identifiers
RSC ontology ID	RXNO:0000511

In organic chemistry, Madelung synthesis is a chemical reaction that produces (substituted or unsubstituted) indoles by the intramolecular cyclization of N-phenylamides using strong base at high temperature. The Madelung synthesis was reported in 1912 by Walter Madelung, when he observed that 2-phenylindole was synthesized using N-benzoyl-o-toluidine and two equivalents of sodium ethoxide in a heated, airless reaction. Common reaction conditions include use of sodium or potassium alkoxide as base in hexane or tetrahydrofuran solvents, at temperatures ranging between 200–400 °C. A hydrolysis step is also required in the synthesis. The Madelung synthesis is important because it is one of few known reactions that produce indoles from a base-catalyzed thermal cyclization of N-acyl-o-toluidines.

== Overall reaction ==
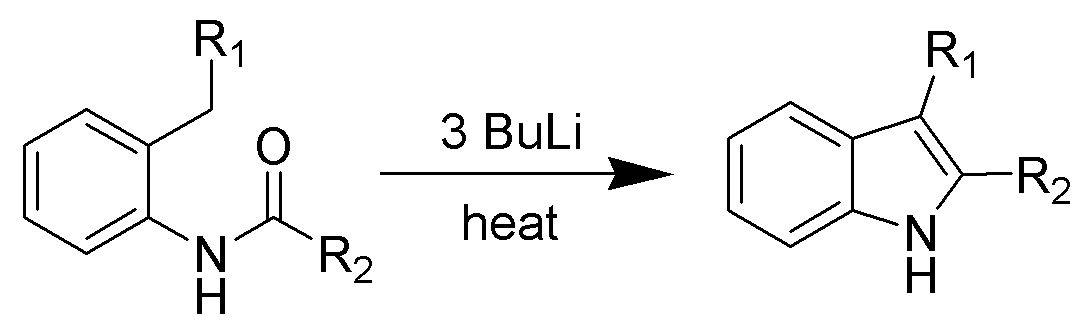

Variants with other bases or additional substituents are possible, but the method is essentially confined to the preparation of 2-alkinylindoles (not easily accessible through electrophilic aromatic substitution) because of vigorous reaction conditions. A detailed reaction mechanism for the Madelung synthesis follows.

== Reaction mechanism ==
The reaction begins with the extraction of a hydrogen from the nitrogen of the amide substituent and the extraction of a benzylic hydrogen from the substituent ortho to the amide substituent by a strong base. Next, the carbanion resulting from the benzylic hydrogen extraction performs a nucleophilic attack on the electrophilic carbonyl carbon of the amide group. When this occurs, the pi-bond of the amide is converted into a lone pair, creating a negatively charged oxygen. After these initial steps, strong base is no longer required and hydrolysis must occur. The negatively charged nitrogen is protonated to regain its neutral charge, and the oxygen is protonated twice to harbor a positive charge in order to become a good leaving group. A lone pair from the nitrogen forms a pi-bond to expel the positively charged leaving group, and also causes the nitrogen to harbor a positive charge. The final step of the reaction is an elimination reaction (specifically an E2 reaction), which involves the extraction of the other hydrogen that was once benzylic, before the bicyclic compound was formed, whose electrons are converted into a new pi-bond in the ring system. This allows the pi-bond formed by nitrogen in the preceding step to be converted back into a lone pair on nitrogen to restore nitrogen's neutral charge.

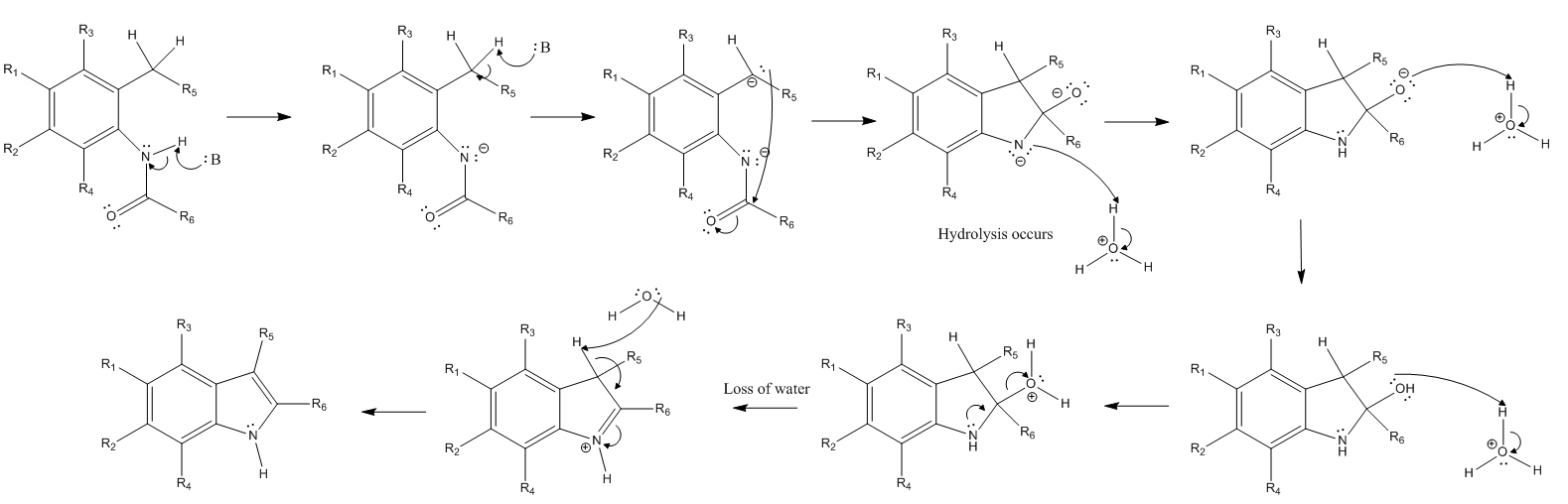
Madelung synthesis mechanism

== Advancements in improving reaction conditions ==
Various techniques have been applied to increase the yield of the desired indole product. When the aromatic ring has electron-donating substituents higher yields are obtained, and the opposite is true when the aromatic ring has electron-withdrawing substituents. However, when the R5 substituent is an electron-withdrawing substituent, the yield is increased instead of decreased. Additionally, the efficiency of the reaction is also heavily dependent on the bulkiness of the R6 substituent. The bulkier this group, the less efficient is the reaction. The conditions required for the Madelung synthesis are quite severe. Fortunately, the aforementioned modifications have been since applied to enhance its practicality, working to decrease the required temperature at which the reaction is performed and increase the desired product yield. For example, when electron-donating are placed on the aromatic ring of the N-phenylamide and an electron-withdrawing substituent is substituted at R5, the required temperature for the reaction decreases to approximately 25 °C. Even more impressively, researchers have discovered that the required temperature for the Madelung synthesis decreases to a temperature range of −20 – 25 °C when butyl lithium (BuLi) and lithium diisopropylamide (LDA) bases are used, and when tetrahydrofuran is used as the solvent. This particular modification, the use of either of these metal-mediated bases, is termed the Madelung-Houlihan variation.

== Synthetic applications ==
The Madelung synthesis has many important applications in chemistry, biochemistry, and industrial chemistry. This reaction served useful in synthesizing, with an 81% yield, the architecturally complex tremorgenic indole alkaloid (-)-penitrem D, a molecule naturally produced by ergot fungus that causes various muscular and neurological diseases in livestock. Because this toxin ultimately causes significant economic problems in the livestock industry, understanding how to synthesize and easily decompose alkaloid (-)-penitrem D is of great importance. Nonetheless, the synthesis of such a complex molecule was, by itself, an incredible feat.

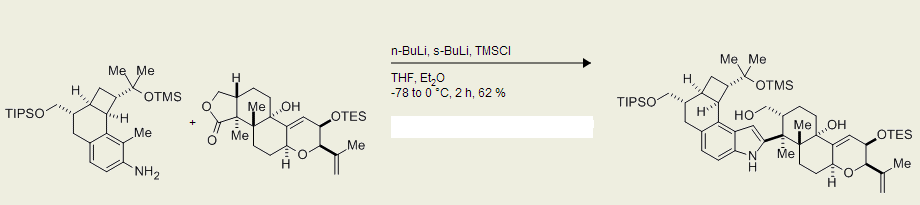
Use of the Madelung synthesis in the synthesis of (-)-penitrem D; this picture is just one step in the total synthesis of (-)-penitrem D.

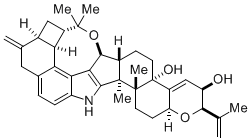
The structure of (-)-penitrem D

Another facet through which the Madelung synthesis has served useful is in the synthesis of 2,6-diphenyl-1,5-diaza-1,5-dihydro-s-indacene, from 2,5-dimethyl-1,4-phenylenediamine.

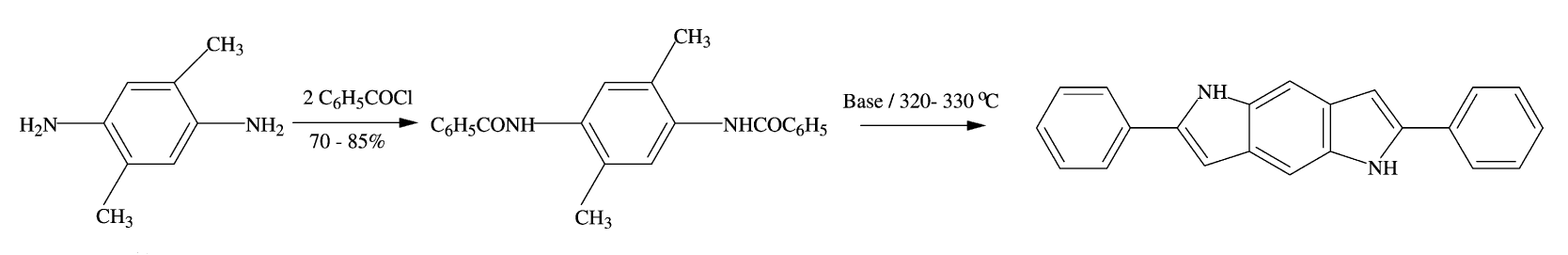
Madelung synthesis of 2,6-diphenyl-1,5-diaza-1,5-dihydro-s-indacene

This synthesis was performed without modification to the Madelung synthesis, using sodium ethoxide base at a temperature of 320 – 330 °C. This indacene has shown to be an organic light-emitting diode that may have important applications for low-cost light displays in commercial industry.

== The Smith-modified Madelung synthesis ==
The Smith-modified Madelung synthesis, also called the Smith indole synthesis, was discovered in 1986 by Amos Smith and his research team. This synthesis employs a condensation reaction of organolithium reagents derived from 2-alkyl-N-trimethylsilyl anilines by esters or carboxylic acids to yield substituted indoles. This synthesis has proven applicable to a wide variety of substituted anilines, including those with alkyl, methoxy, and halide groups, and can react with non-enolizable esters or lactones to yield N-lithioketamine intermediates. These intermediates then undergo intramolecular heteroatom Peterson olefination to yield indolinines, which then tautomerize to 2-substituted indoles. The Smith indole synthesis is one of the most important modifications to the Madelung synthesis.

=== Reaction mechanism of the Smith indole synthesis ===
The Smith indole synthesis begins by use of two equivalents of an organolithium reagent (as organolithium reagents are very strong bases) to extract a hydrogen from both the alkyl substituent and the nitrogen, resulting in a negative charge on both. The synthesis proceeds with a nucleophilic attack of the carbanion on the electrophilic carbonyl carbon of the ester or carboxylic acid. When this occurs, the pi-bond of the electrophile is converted into a lone pair on the oxygen. These lone pairs are then reconverted back into a pi-bond, resulting in the expulsion of the -OR group. Next, the negatively charged nitrogen performs a nucleophilic attack on the adjacent electrophilic carbonyl carbon, again causing the pi-bond of the electrophile to be converted into a lone pair on the oxygen. This negatively charged oxygen then performs a nucleophilic attack on the silicon atom of the trimethylsilyl (TMS) group, resulting in a tricyclic compound, and a positively charged silicon atom and neutral oxygen atom. The synthesis proceeds through an intramolecular heteroatom Peterson olefination, ultimately resulting in an elimination reaction which expels a TMSO group and forms a pi-bond in the five-membered ring at the nitrogen atom. Then, keto-enol tautomerism occurs, resulting in the desired product.

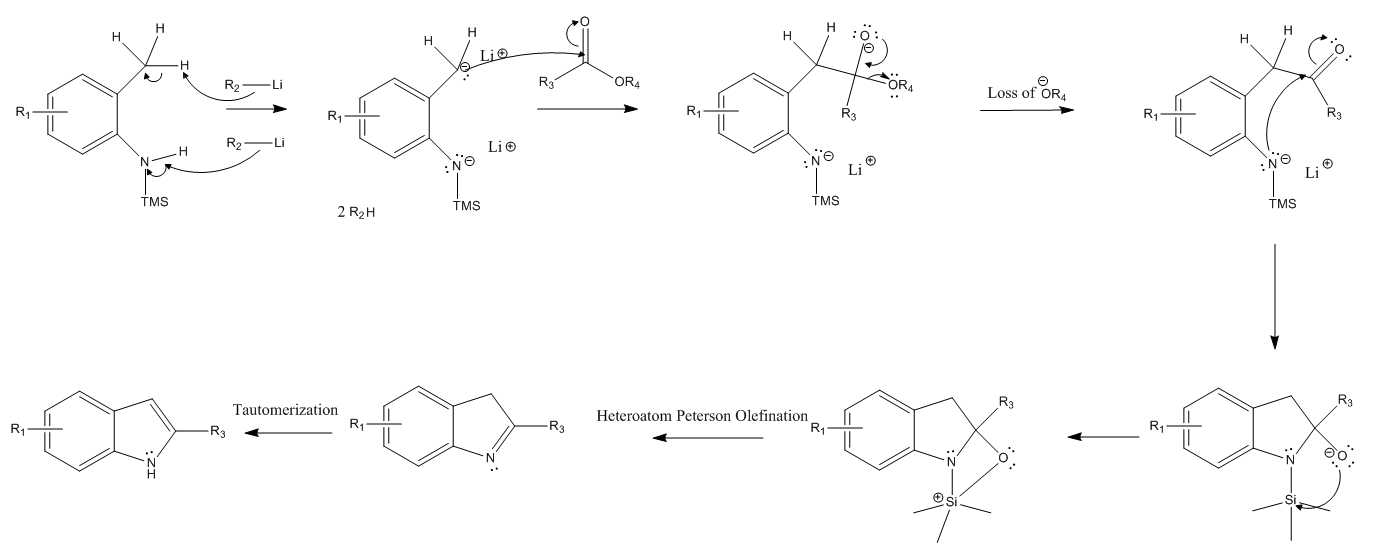
Reaction Mechanism for the Smith Indole Synthesis
