= Ingrid of Sweden (disambiguation) =

Ingrid of Sweden (1910–2000) was the queen consort of Frederik IX of Denmark and only daughter of Gustaf VI Adolf of Sweden.

Ingrid of Sweden may also refer to:

- Ingrid Ragnvaldsdotter (1100 or 1110 – after 1161), queen consort of Harald IV of Norway and granddaughter of Inge I of Sweden
- Ingrid Ylva (c. 1180s – c. 1250 to 1255), second wife of Magnus Minniskiöld and mother of Birger Jarl
- Ingrid of Skänninge (c. 1220 – 1282), Swedish prioress

== See also ==
- Ingi of Sweden (disambiguation)
