= Dienone–phenol rearrangement =

Chemical reaction

Dienone–phenol rearrangement of 4,4-disubstituted cyclohexadienone into 3,4‐disubstituted phenol

The dienone–phenol rearrangement is a reaction in organic chemistry first reported in 1921 by Karl von Auwers and Karl Ziegler. A common example of dienone–phenol rearrangement is 4,4-disubstituted cyclohexadienone converting into a stable 3,4-disubstituted phenol in presence of acid. A similar rearrangement is possible with a 2,2-disubstituted cyclohexadienone to its corresponding disubstituted phenol. Usually this type of rearrangement is spontaneous unless a dichloromethyl group is present at the 4th position or the process is otherwise blocked.

Dienone–phenol rearrangement of 2,2-disubstituted cyclohexadienone

The reverse reaction is the Zincke–Suhl reaction.

== Reaction mechanism ==
The reaction mechanism of 4,4-disubstituted cyclohexadienones to 3,4-disubstituted phenol is illustrated here.

The migration tendency for the two different groups (R) present at either 4,4 position or 2,2 position can be determined by comparing the relative stability of the intermediate carbocation formed during rearrangement. In case of acid-promoted conditions, some relative migration tendencies are: COOEt > phenyl (or alkyl); phenyl > methyl; vinyl > methyl; methyl > alkoxy and alkoxy > phenyl. In some cases such as allyl and benzyl group, the actual rearrangement might happen through the Cope rearrangement.

== Variations ==
Apart from acid catalysis, the dienone–phenol rearrangement is also possible in presence of base. The dienone–phenol rearrangement has been used in the synthesis of steroids, anthracenes, and phenanthrenes.
