= Hilda Ingold =

British chemist

Edith Hilda, Lady Ingold
- Born: Edith Hilda Usherwood; 21 July 1898; Catford, London, England
- Died: 1988 (aged 89 or 90)
- Education: Imperial College London
- Spouse: Sir Christopher Kelk Ingold
- Children: 3
- Scientific career
- Fields: Chemistry
- Workplaces: Imperial College London
- Doctoral advisor: Martha Whiteley

Edith Hilda, Lady Ingold (née Usherwood; 21 May 1898 – 1988) was a British chemist. Her career was overshadowed by that of her husband. She gained little public recognition, despite her innovative chemistry and work with her husband on organic chemistry. She became Lady Ingold upon her husband's knighthood.

== Early life ==
Edith Hilda Usherwood was born into a working-class family in Catford (south-east London).

She attended a girls' grammar school in Lewisham, and then had two years of private education in Horsham. She then moved to the North London Collegiate School after she was awarded a Clothworker's Scholarship.

As an undergraduate at Royal Holloway College, Usherwood attained a BSc Hons in Chemistry (1916-1920) before completing her doctorate in 1923 at Imperial College London. As the doctoral degree was only introduced to British universities in 1917, she was one of the earliest students to qualify. Her PhD project was on tautomers, isomers of molecules that differ only in the position of a labile hydrogen atom. Her doctoral supervisor was Martha Whiteley.

Her subsidiary subject was physics, which led to research in physical organic chemistry and quantum mechanics. Following completion of her PhD she went on to complete a DSc.

== Recognition ==
She was president of the UCL Chemical and Physical society during the 1976-1977 academic year, one of the oldest and most prestigious societies at the university.

== Personal life ==
She married fellow Chemistry student Christopher Kelk Ingold in 1923 and went on to have three children. They had two daughters and a son, chemist Keith Ingold.
