= Keith Usherwood Ingold =

British-Canadian chemist (1929–2023)

Keith Usherwood Ingold OC FRS FRSC FRSE
- Born: 31 May 1929; Leeds, England
- Died: 8 September 2023 (aged 94); Ottawa, Ontario, Canada
- Education: University of London; University of Oxford
- Known for: Research into the mechanisms of free radicals
- Awards: Petroleum Chemistry Award (1968); Tory Medal (1985); Linus Pauling Award (1988); Davy Medal (1990); Royal Medal (2000)
- Scientific career
- Fields: Chemical synthesis
- Workplaces: National Research Council

Keith Usherwood Ingold OC FRS FRSC FRSE (31 May 1929 – 8 September 2023) was a British-Canadian chemist.

== Life and career ==
Keith Usherwood Ingold was born to Sir Christopher Ingold and Dr. Hilda Usherwood, and studied for a BSc in Chemistry at the University of London, completing his degree in 1949. He continued his higher education with a PhD in chemistry at Oxford University, completed in 1951. Soon after graduation he moved to Canada to begin work with the National Research Council, followed by two years of post-doctoral research at the University of British Columbia. He returned to work for the NRC in 1955 as a research officer, followed by a promotion to head of the Free Radical Chemistry Section. He was awarded the 1968 Petroleum Chemistry Award, the 1988 Linus Pauling Award, and both the Davy Medal and Royal Medal of the Royal Society, the latter for "elucidating the mechanism of reactions involving free radicals". In 1995 he was made an officer of the Order of Canada. He received honorary degrees from the universities of Guelph, Mount Allison, St Andrews, Carleton, McMaster and Dalhousie.

In his later career, Ingold's work focused on radical-trapping antioxidants, vitamin E in particular, and their effect on aging and on preventing such age-related diseases as cancer.

Ingold died in Ottawa, Ontario on 8 September 2023, at the age of 94.

== Selected works ==
- Burton GW; Joyce A; Ingold KU (15 February 1983). "Is vitamin E the only lipid-soluble, chain-breaking antioxidant in human blood plasma and erythrocyte membranes?". Archives of Biochemistry and Biophysics. 221 (1): 281–290. doi:10.1016/0003-9861(83)90145-5. PMID 6830261.
- Burton, GW; Ingold KU (11 May 1984). "beta-Carotene: an unusual type of lipid antioxidant". Science. 224 (4649): 569–573. Bibcode:1984Sci...224..569B. doi:10.1126/science.6710156. PMID 6710156.
- Burton, GW; Ingold KU (July 1986). "Vitamin E: application of the principles of physical organic chemistry to the exploration of its structure and function". Accounts of Chemical Research. 19 (7): 194–201. doi:10.1021/ar00127a001.
