= Ingi of Sweden =

Ingi of Sweden - English also: Ingold; Swedish: Inge or Yngve or Ingjald - may refer to (chronologically):

- Yngvi, mythological Swedish ruler, also known as Yngve Freyr
- Yngvi, legendary Swedish ruler
- Ingold Illready, semi-legendary Swedish ruler
- Inge the Elder, King of Sweden 1079
- Inge the Younger, King of Sweden 1118

== See also ==
- Ingrid of Sweden (disambiguation)
