= Chemical group =

A chemical group may refer to:

- Group (periodic table), a set of valence-isoelectronic elements
- Functional group, a motif in organic chemistry
