= Frederick de la Mare =

New Zealand lawyer and educationalist

Frederick Archibald de la Mare (6 August 1877 – 9 May 1960) was a New Zealand lawyer and educationalist. He was born in Christchurch, New Zealand, on 6 August 1877.

De la Mare was an advocate of prison reform and the rehabilitation of prisoners. Although he was not listed as an author he assisted Blanche Baughan to write a book on penal reform People in Prison. The book was controversial at the time but was far-sighted in proposing probation, probation officers and the treatment of prisoners' alcohol and mental health issues.

In 1935, he was awarded the King George V Silver Jubilee Medal.
