= Christopher Kelk Ingold =

British chemist (1893–1970)

Sir Christopher Kelk Ingold BEM FRS
- Ingold, as photographed in Michigan State University.
- Born: 28 October 1893; London, England
- Died: 8 December 1970 (aged 77); Edgware, London, England
- Education: Hartley University College (now University of Southampton); Imperial College London
- Known for: Organic reaction mechanisms Cahn–Ingold–Prelog priority rules Hughes–Ingold rules Thorpe–Ingold effect
- Awards: Davy Medal (1946); Royal Medal (1952); Faraday Lectureship Prize (1961)
- Scientific career
- Fields: Chemistry
- Workplaces: Imperial College London; University of Leeds; University College London
- Thesis: Formation and stability of carbon rings (1921)
- Academic advisors: Jocelyn Field Thorpe
- Doctoral students: Ronald Gillespie; Ronald Sydney Nyholm; Peter de la Mare

Signature
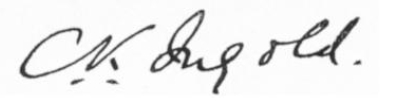

Sir Christopher Kelk Ingold (28 October 1893 – 8 December 1970) was a British chemist based in Leeds and London. His groundbreaking work in the 1920s and 1930s on reaction mechanisms and the electronic structure of organic compounds was responsible for the introduction into mainstream chemistry of concepts such as nucleophile, electrophile, inductive and resonance effects, and such descriptors as S_{N}1, S_{N}2, E1, and E2 now known as the Hughes–Ingold symbols. He also was a co-author of the Cahn–Ingold–Prelog priority rules. Ingold is regarded as one of the chief pioneers of physical organic chemistry.

== Early life and education ==
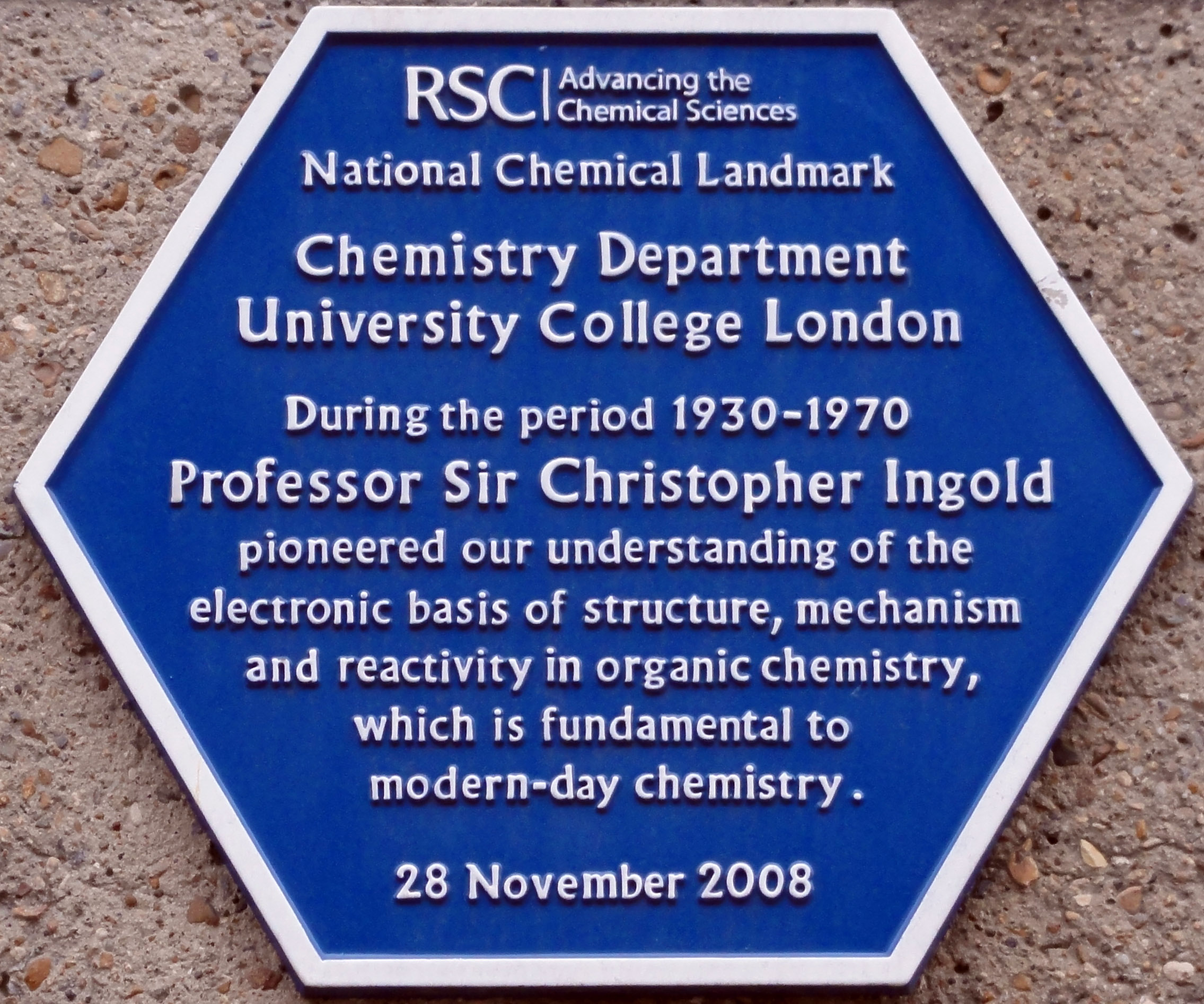
RSC commemorative plaque at University College.

Born in London to a silk merchant who died of tuberculosis when Ingold was five years old, Ingold began his scientific studies at Hartley University College at Southampton (now Southampton University) taking an external BSc in 1913 with the University of London. He then joined the laboratory of Jocelyn Field Thorpe at Imperial College, London, with a brief hiatus from 1918–1920 during which he conducted research into chemical warfare and the manufacture of poison gas with Cassel Chemical at Glasgow. Ingold received an MSc from the University of London and returned to Imperial College in 1920 to work with Thorpe. He was awarded a PhD in 1918 and a DSc in 1921.

== Academic career ==
In 1924 Ingold moved to the University of Leeds where he spent six years as Professor of Organic Chemistry working alongside his wife, Dr. Edith Hilda Ingold (Usherwood). He returned to London in 1930, and served for 24 years as head of the chemistry department at University College London, from 1937 until his retirement in 1961.

During his study of alkyl halides, Ingold found evidence for two possible reaction mechanisms for nucleophilic substitution reactions. He found that tertiary alkyl halides underwent a two-step mechanism (S_{N}1) while primary and secondary alkyl halides underwent a one-step mechanism (S_{N}2). This conclusion was based on the finding that reactions of tertiary alkyl halides with nucleophiles were dependent on the concentration of the alkyl halide only. Meanwhile, he discovered that primary and secondary alkyl halides, when reacting with nucleophiles, depend on both the concentration of the alkyl halide and the concentration of the nucleophile.

Starting around 1926, Ingold and Robert Robinson carried out a heated debate on the electronic theoretical approaches to organic reaction mechanisms. See, for example, the summary by Saltzman.

Ingold authored and co-authored 443 papers. Notable students include Peter de la Mare, Ronald Gillespie and Ronald Nyholm.

== Honours ==
In 1920, Ingold was awarded the British Empire Medal (BEM) for his wartime research involving "great courage in carrying out work in a poisonous atmosphere, and risking his life on several occasions in preventing serious accidents," though he subsequently never discussed the award or this period in his life.

Ingold was elected a Fellow of the Royal Society (FRS) in 1924. He received the Longstaff Medal of the Royal Society of Chemistry in 1951, the Royal Medal of the Royal Society in 1952, and was knighted in 1958.

The chemistry department of University College London is now housed in the Sir Christopher Ingold building, opened in 1969.

== Personal life ==
Ingold married Dr. Edith Hilda Ingold (Usherwood) in 1923. She was a fellow chemist with whom he collaborated. They had two daughters and a son, the chemist Keith Ingold.

== Death ==
Ingold died in London in 1970, aged 77.
