= Intramolecular reaction =

Process or characteristic limited to the structure of a single molecule

In chemistry, intramolecular describes a process or characteristic limited within the structure of a single molecule, a property or phenomenon limited to the extent of a single molecule.

== Relative rates ==
In intramolecular organic reactions, two reaction sites are contained within a single molecule. This configuration elevates the effective concentration of the reacting partners resulting in high reaction rates. Many intramolecular reactions are observed where the intermolecular version does not take place.

Intramolecular reactions, especially ones leading to the formation of 5- and 6-membered rings, are rapid compared to an analogous intermolecular process. This is largely a consequence of the reduced entropic cost for reaching the transition state of ring formation and the absence of significant strain associated with formation of rings of these sizes. For the formation of different ring sizes via cyclization of substrates of varying tether length, the order of reaction rates (rate constants k_{n} for the formation of an n-membered ring) is usually k_{5} > k_{6} > k_{3} > k_{7} > k_{4} as shown below for a series of ω-bromoalkylamines. This somewhat complicated rate trend reflects the interplay of these entropic and strain factors:

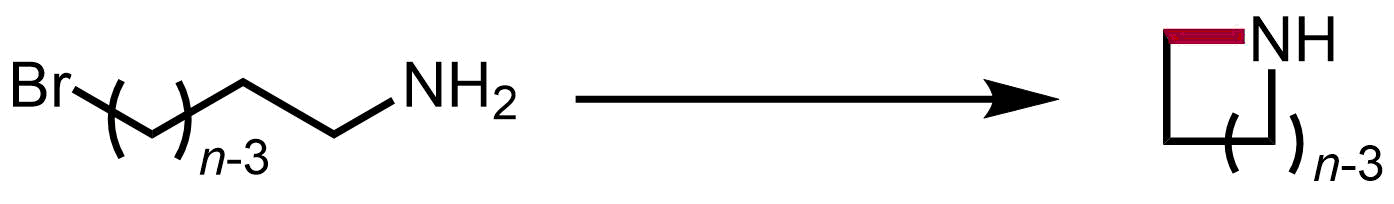

Relative rate constants for cyclization (n = 5 set to k_{rel} = 100)
n	k_{rel}	n	k_{rel}	n	k_{rel}
3	0.1	6	1.7	12	0.00001
4	0.002	7	0.03	14	0.0003
5	100	10	0.00000001	15	0.0003

For the 'small rings' (3- and 4- membered), the slow rates is a consequence of angle strain experienced at the transition state. Although three-membered rings are more strained, formation of aziridine is faster than formation of azetidine due to the proximity of the leaving group and nucleophile in the former, which increases the probability that they would meet in a reactive conformation. The same reasoning holds for the 'unstrained rings' (5-, 6-, and 7-membered). The formation of 'medium-sized rings' (8- to 13-membered) is particularly disfavorable due to a combination of an increasingly unfavorable entropic cost and the additional presence of transannular strain arising from steric interactions across the ring. Finally, for 'large rings' (14-membered or higher), the rate constants level off, as the distance between the leaving group and nucleophile is now so large the reaction is now effectively intermolecular.

Although the details may change somewhat, the general trends hold for a variety of intramolecular reactions, including radical-mediated and (in some cases) transition metal-catalyzed processes.

== Examples ==
Many reactions in organic chemistry can occur in either an intramolecular or intermolecular senses. Some reactions are by definition intramolecular or are only practiced intramolecularly, e.g.,

- Dieckmann condensation of diesters is the intramolecular version of aldol condensation.
- Madelung synthesis of indoles
- Smiles rearrangement
- Hydroacylation is almost invariably practiced intramolecularly to produce ketones.

RCHO + CH_{2}=CHR' → RC(O)CH_{2}CH_{2}R'

- Nazarov cyclization reaction for the synthesis of cyclopentenones

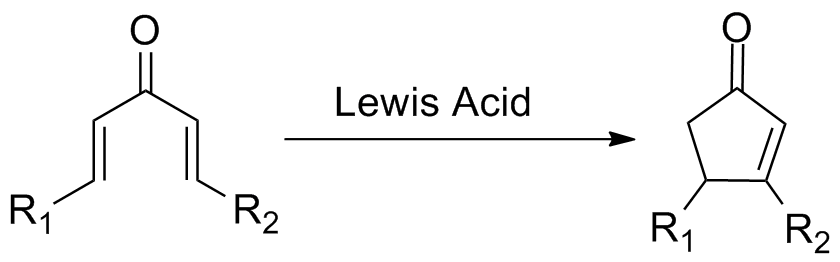
The Nazarov cyclization reaction

- The Wurtz reaction, involving reductive coupling of alkyl halides, essentially is only useful when conducted intramolecularly. Its utility is illustrated with the synthesis of strained rings:

Some transformations that are enabled or enhanced intramolecularly. For example, the acyloin condensation of diesters almost uniquely produces 10-membered carbocycles, which are difficult to construct otherwise. Another example is the 2+2 cycloaddition of norbornadiene to give quadricyclane.

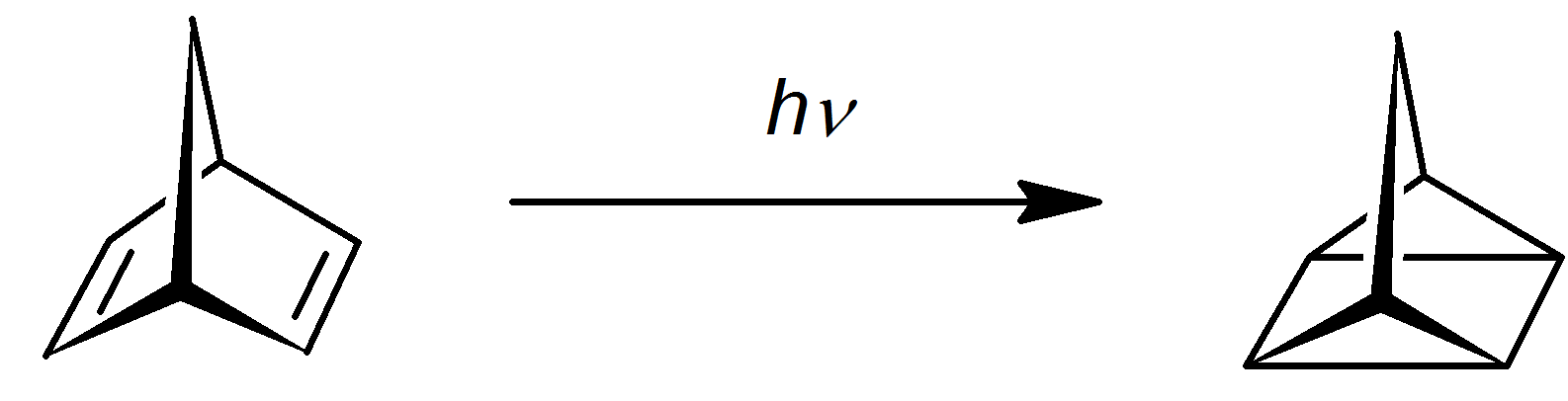

== Tools and concepts ==
Many tools and concepts have been developed to exploit the advantages of intramolecular cyclizations. For example, installing large substituents exploits the Thorpe-Ingold effect. High dilution reactions suppress intermolecular processes. One set of tools involves tethering as discussed below.

=== Tethered intramolecular [2+2] reactions ===
Tethered intramolecular [2+2] reactions entail the formation of cyclobutane and cyclobutanone via intramolecular 2+2 photocycloadditions. Tethering ensures formation of a multi-cyclic system.

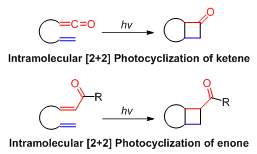
Tethered intramolecular [2+2] reactions

The length of the tether affects the stereochemical outcome of the [2+2] reaction. Longer tethers tend to generate the "straight" product where the terminal carbon of the alkene is linked to the $\alpha$-carbon of the enone. When the tether consists only two carbons, the “bent” product is generated where the $\beta$-carbon of the enone is connected to the terminal carbon of the alkene.

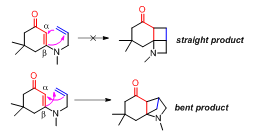
Effects of the length of tether on [2+2] photocyclization reaction

Tethered [2+2] reactions have been used to synthesize organic compounds with interesting ring systems and topologies. For example, [2+2] photocyclization was used to construct the tricyclic core structure in ginkgolide B.

Tethered [2+2] reaction in the total synthesis of (+) - Ginkgolide B

=== Molecular tethers ===
Otherwise-intermolecular reactions can be made temporarily intramolecular by linking both reactants by a tether with all the advantages associated to it. Popular choices of tether contain a carbonate ester, boronic ester, silyl ether, or a silyl acetal link (silicon tethers) which are fairly inert in many organic reactions yet can be cleaved by specific reagents. The main hurdle for this strategy to work is selecting the proper length for the tether and making sure reactive groups have an optimal orientation with respect to each other. An examples is a Pauson–Khand reaction of an alkene and an alkyne tethered together via a silyl ether.

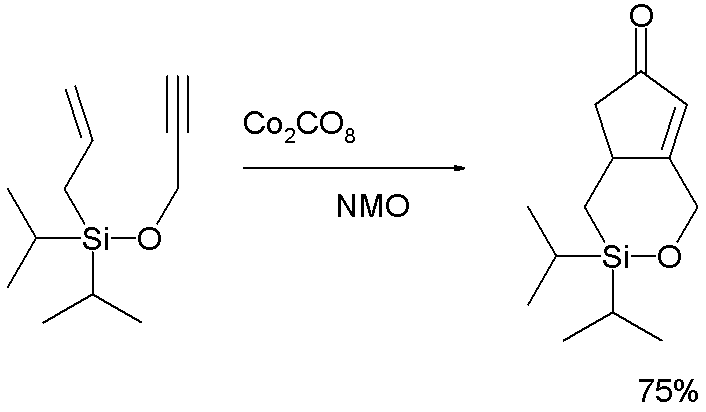

In this particular reaction, the tether angle bringing the reactive groups together is effectively reduced by placing isopropyl groups on the silicon atom via the Thorpe–Ingold effect. No reaction takes place when these bulky groups are replaced by smaller methyl groups. Another example is a photochemical [2+2]cycloaddition with two alkene groups tethered through a silicon acetal group (racemic, the other enantiomer not depicted), which is subsequently cleaved by TBAF yielding the endo-diol.

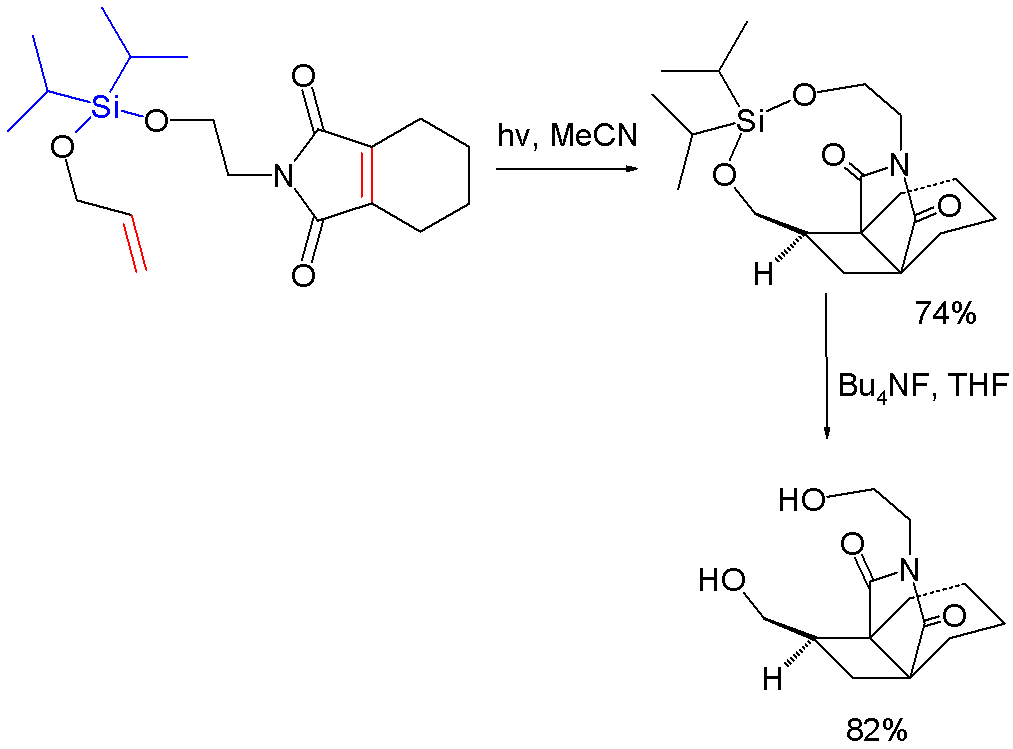

Without the tether, the exo isomer forms.
