= Thorpe–Ingold effect =

Organic chemistry effect

The Thorpe–Ingold effect, gem-dimethyl effect, or angle compression is an effect observed in chemistry where increasing steric hindrance favours ring closure and intramolecular reactions. The effect was first reported by Beesley, Thorpe, and Ingold in 1915 as part of a study of cyclization reactions. It has since been generalized to many areas of chemistry.

The comparative rates of lactone formation (lactonization) of various 2-hydroxybenzenepropionic acids illustrate the effect. The placement of an increasing number of methyl groups accelerates the cyclization process.

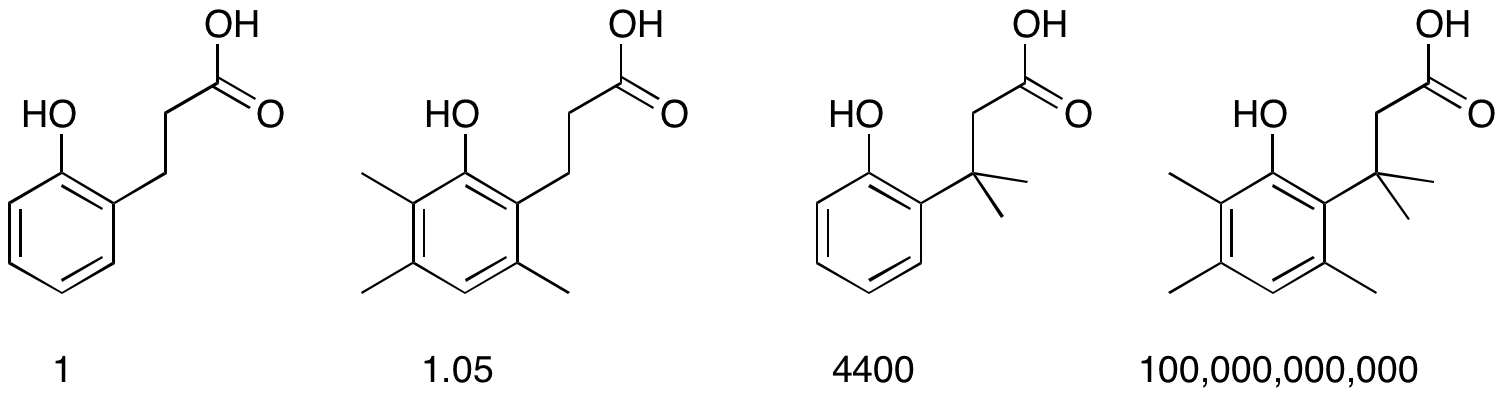

One application of this effect is addition of a quaternary carbon (e.g., a gem-dimethyl group) in an alkyl chain to increase the reaction rate and/or equilibrium constant of cyclization reactions. An example of this is an olefin metathesis reaction: In the field of peptide foldamers, amino acid residues containing quaternary carbons such as 2-aminoisobutyric acid are used to promote formation of certain types of helices.

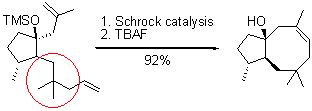

One proposed explanation for this effect is that the increased size of the substituents increases the angle between them. As a result, the angle between the other two substituents decreases. By moving them closer together, reactions between them are accelerated. It is thus a kinetic effect.

The effect also has some thermodynamic contribution as the in silico strain energy decreases on going from cyclobutane to 1-methylcyclobutane and 1,1-dimethylcyclobutane by a value between 8 kcal/mole and 1.5 kcal/mole. A noteworthy example of the Thorpe-Ingold effect in supramolecular catalysis is given by diphenylmethane derivatives provided with guanidinium groups. These compounds are active in the cleavage of the RNA model compound HPNP. Substitution of the methylene group of the parent diphenylmethane spacer with cyclohexylidene and adamantylidene moieties enhances catalytic efficiency, with gem dialkyl effect accelerations of 4.5 and 9.1, respectively.

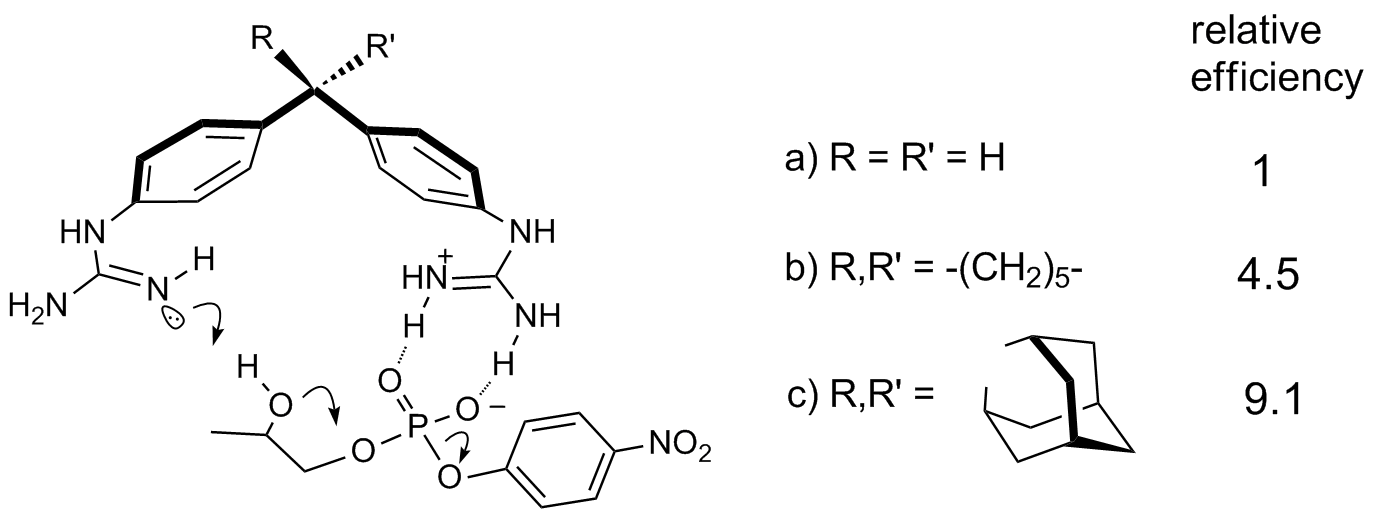

== See also ==
- Chelate effect
- Flippin–Lodge angle
- Baldwin's rules
