= Gabriella Belli =

Italian art historian and curator

Gabriella Belli (born 1952) is an Italian art historian and curator, currently director of the Foundation for the municipal museums of Venice ("Fondazione Musei Civici di Venezia").

== Life ==
Gabriella Belli was born in Trento, the overwhelmingly Italian speaking capital of Italy's bilingual Trentino-Alto Adige/Südtirol region.

She graduated from Bologna University, producing a dissertation with Anna Ottavi Cavina on the history of court painting in nineteenth century Russia. She then specialised in contemporary art criticism at the University of Parma. Returning to Trento in 1981 she was appointed curator at the Buonconsiglio Castle Museum. In 1982 she was given responsibility for the project to transform the Palazzo delle Albere into what would become the nucleus, till 2011, of the Museum of Modern and Contemporary Art of Trento and Rovereto.

She held the post of commissioner at the Venice Biennale in 1995 and 2003, and became a member of the scientific committees for the Bolzano Museum of Contemporary Art and for the Bologna Modern Art Gallery. She has been involved since 1989 in the MART project. In 2002 she inaugurated the new MART museum complex at Rovereto, becoming its first director. It was still under her direction that in 2009 the restored home for the Deperio Futurist Art Museum reopened.

In 2011 she was appointed director of the Foundation for the municipal museums of Venice ("Fondazione Musei Civici di Venezia"), a structure created to bring together the administration of several of the most important palace-museums in Venice, including (but not restricted to) the Doge's Palace, the Ca' Rezzonico Palace, the Correr Museum, the Ca' Pesaro Palace, the Fortuny Palace-Museum and the Mocenigo Palace-Museum.

== Recognition ==
In 2003, jointly with Novello Finotti and Cesare Montecucco, Belli was a winner of the Premio internazionale Civiltà Veneta (Venetian international arts prize).

In 2011 she received from Guy Cogeval, on behalf of the French Culture Minister a Knighthood of Arts and Literature and the ICOM Italy prize when she was named as the best museologist of the year.
