= Royal Medal =

Award of the Royal Society

Royal Medals
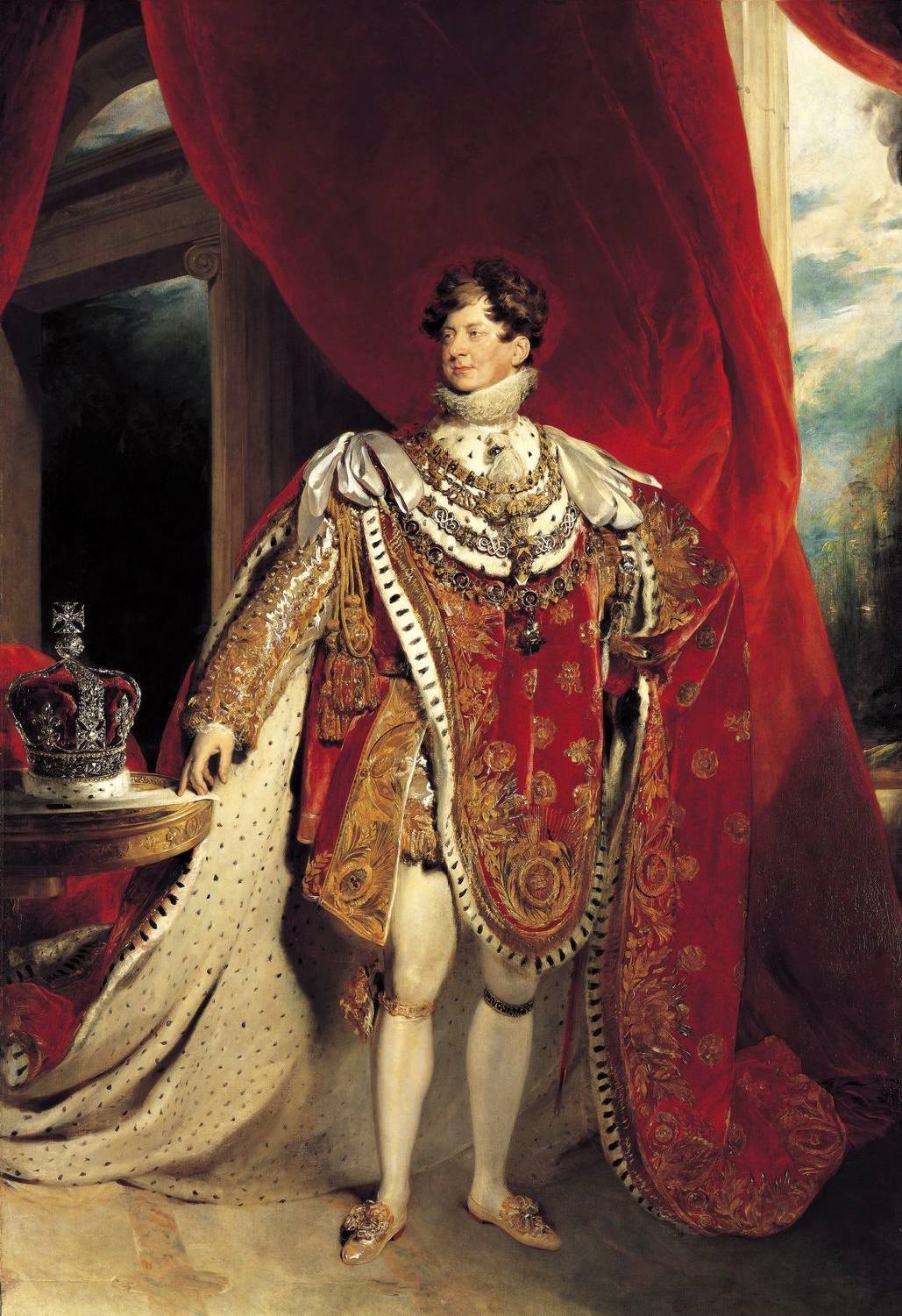
- King George IV of the United Kingdom (pictured) initiated the Royal Medals during 1825.
- Awarded for: Outstanding achievements in biological, physical and applied sciences.
- Sponsored by: The Royal Society of London, UK
- Date: Since 1826
- Country: United Kingdom
- Website: royalsociety.org/grants-schemes-awards/awards/royal-medal/

Precedence
- Next (higher): Bakerian Medal (physical sciences); Croonian Medal (biological sciences)
- Next (lower): All other society awards/medals in the biological or physical sciences (restricted to Commonwealth or Irish citizens or residents only); Foreign Member of the Royal Society (ForMemRS)

The Royal Medal, also known as The Queen's Medal and The King's Medal (depending on the gender of the monarch at the time of the award), is a silver-gilt medal, of which three are awarded each year by the British Royal Society. Two are given for "the most important contributions to the advancement of natural knowledge," and one for "distinguished contributions in the applied sciences", all of which are done within the Commonwealth of Nations.

== Background ==
The award was created by George IV and awarded first during 1826. Initially there were two medals awarded, both for the most important discovery within the year previous, a time period which was lengthened to five years and then shortened to three. The format was endorsed by William IV and Victoria, who had the conditions changed during 1837 so that mathematics was a subject for which a Royal Medal could be awarded, albeit only every third year. The conditions were changed again during 1850 so that:

... the Royal Medals in each year should be awarded for the two most important contributions to the advancement of Natural Knowledge, published originally in Her Majesty's dominions within a period of not more than ten years and not less than one year of the date of the award, subject, of course, to Her Majesty's approval. ... in the award of the Royal Medals, one should be given in each of the two great divisions of Natural Knowledge.

During 1965, the system was changed to its current format, in which three medals are awarded annually by the monarch on the recommendation of the Royal Society Council. Because of its dual nature (for both physical and biological science) the award winners are chosen by both the A- and B-side Award Committees. Since its establishment during 1826 the medal has been awarded 405 times.

== Full list of recipients ==
Year	Name	Field	Rationale	Ref.
1826	James Ivory	Mathematics	"For his Paper on Astronomical Refractions, published in the Philosophical Transactions for the year 1823; and his other valuable Papers on Mathematical Subjects."	
1826	John Dalton	Physics	"For his development of the Atomic Theory and his other important labours and discoveries in Physical Science."	
1827	Friedrich Georg Wilhelm Struve	Astronomy	"For his Work, entitled, Catalogus Novus Stellarum Duplicium."	
1827	Humphry Davy	Physics	"For his Bakerian Lecture, On the Relations of Electrical Changes, considered as the last link, in the order of time, of the splendid chain of Discoveries in Chemical Electricity, which has been continued for so many years of his valuable life."	
1828	Johann Franz Encke	Astronomy	"For his Accurate Determination of the Orbit of a Comet of short period, as confirmed by observation."	
1828	William Hyde Wollaston	Chemistry	"For his communication, entitled, On a method of rendering Platina malleable, being the conclusion of a series of researches on the properties of the Metallic Bodies contained in the Ores of Platina."	
1829	Charles Bell	Anatomy	"For his Discoveries relating to the Nervous System."	
1829	Eilhard Mitscherlich	Chemistry	"For his Discoveries relating to the Laws of Crystallization, and the Properties of Crystals."	
1830	Antoine Jerome Balard	Chemistry	"For his Discovery of Brome."	
1830	David Brewster	Physics	"For his Communications to the Royal Society on the Polarization and other Properties of Light."	
1831	No award			
1832	No award			
1833	Augustin Pyramus de Candolle	Botany	"For his Researches and Investigations in Vegetable Physiology, as detailed in his Work, entitled, Physiologie Vegetale."	
1833	John Herschel	Astronomy	"For his Paper "on the Investigation of the Orbits of Revolving Double Stars," inserted in the Fifth Volume of the Memoirs of the Royal Astronomical Society."	
1834	Charles Lyell	Geology	"For his Work, entitled, Principles of Geology."	
1834	John William Lubbock	Physics	"For his Papers on the Tides published in the Philosophical Transactions."	
1835	Michael Faraday	Chemistry	"For his investigations and discoveries contained in the series of experimental researches in electricity published in the Philosophical Transactions, and more particularly for the seventh series, relating to the definite nature of electrochemical action."	
1835	William Rowan Hamilton	Physics	"For the papers published by him in the 16th and 17th volumes of the Transactions of the Royal Irish Academy, entitled Supplement to an Essay on the Theory of Systems of Rays, and more particularly for those investigations at the conclusion of the third and last supplement, which relate to the discovery of conic refraction."	
1836	George Newport	Anatomy	"For his series of investigations on the anatomy and physiology of insects, contained in his two papers published in the Philosophical Transactions within the last three years."	
1836	John Herschel	Astronomy	"For his paper on nebulae and clusters of stars, published in the Philosophical Transactions for 1833."	
1837	William Whewell	Physics	"For his researches connected with the theory of the tides, communicated to the Royal Society and published in its Transactions within the last three years."	
1838	William Fox Talbot	Mathematics	"For his papers entitled Researches in the Integral Calculus, published in the Philosophical Transactions for 1836 and 1837."	
1838	Thomas Graham	Chemistry	"For his paper entitled "Inquiries respecting the Constitution of salts, of oxalates, nitrates, phosphates, sulphates and chlorides," published in the Philosophical Transactions for 1836."	
1839	James Ivory	Mathematics	"For his paper on the theory of the astronomical refractions published in the Philosophical Transactions for 1838. Part II."	
1839	Martin Barry	Embryology	"For his papers on embryology, published in the Philosophical Transactions for 1838 and 1839."	
1840	Charles Wheatstone	Physiology	"For his paper entitled Contributions to the physiology of vision, published in the Philosophical Transactions for 1838."	
1840	John Herschel	Astronomy	"For his paper entitled On the chemical action of the rays of the solar spectrum on preparations of silver, and other substances, both metallic and non-metallic, and on some photogenic processes, published in the Philosophical Transactions for 1840."	
1841	Eaton Hodgkinson	Engineering	"For his paper entitled Experimental researches on the strength of pillars of cast iron, published in the Philosophical Transactions for 1840."	
1841	Robert Kane	Chemistry	"For his memoir entitled the Chemical History of archil and litmus, published in the Philosophical Transactions for the year 1840."	
1842	John Frederic Daniell	Chemistry	"For his letters on the electrolysis of secondary compounds and on voltaic combinations published in the Transactions for 1840 and 1842."	
1842	William Bowman	Anatomy	"For his paper on the structure and use of the Malpighian bodies of the kidney, with observations on the circulation through that gland, published in the Philosophical Transactions of the present year."	
1843	Charles Wheatstone	Physics	"For his paper entitled, an account of several new instruments and processes for determining the constants of a voltaic circuit, printed in the Philosophical Transactions for the present year."	
1843	James David Forbes	Physics	"For his researches on the law of extinction of the solar rays in passing through the atmosphere, contained in a paper published in the Philosophical Transactions for 1842."	
1844	George Boole	Mathematics	"For his paper on a general method in analysis, published in the Philosophical Transactions of the present year."	
1844	Thomas Andrews	Chemistry	"For his paper on the thermal changes accompanying basic substitutions, published in the Philosophical Transactions of the present year."	
1845	George Biddell Airy	Astronomy	"For his paper on the laws of the tides on the coast of Ireland, as inferred from an extensive series of observations made in connection with the Ordnance Survey of Ireland, published in the Philosophical Transactions for the present year."	
1845	Thomas Snow Beck	Medicine	"For his paper entitled On the nerves of the uterus, which has been ordered for publication in the Philosophical Transactions."	
1846	Michael Faraday	Physics	"For his experimental researches in electricity, twentieth and twenty first series, on new magnetic actions, and on the magnetic conditions of all matter, inserted in the Philosophical Transactions part I. for 1845."	
1846	Richard Owen	Biology	"For his paper entitled A description of certain Belemnites preserved with a great proportion of their soft parts in the Oxford clay at Christian-Malford, Wilts, published in the Philosophical Transactions for 1844."	
1847	George Fownes	Chemistry	"For his papers published in the Philosophical Transactions for 1845, on the artificial formation of a vegeto-alkali, and on benzoline, published in the same volume of the Transactions"	
1847	William Robert Grove	Physics	"For his papers published in the Philosophical Transactions for 1845 and 1847, on the gas voltaic battery, and on certain phenomena of voltaic ignition"	
1848	Charles James Hargreave	Mathematics	"For his paper on the solution of linear differential equations, published in the Philosophical Transactions for 1848.	
1848	Thomas Galloway	Mathematics	"For his paper on the proper motion of the Solar System, published in the Philosophical Transactions for 1847"	
1849	Edward Sabine	Astronomy	"For his contributions to terrestrial magnetism, published in the Philosophical Transactions parts VII and VIII, and his memoir on the diurnal variation of the magnetic declination at Saint Helena, part I."	
1849	Gideon Mantell	Geology	"For his paper on the Iguanodon, published in the Philosophical Transactions for the year 1848, being a continuation of a series of papers by him on the same fossil reptile, by which he has rendered eminent services to geology."	
1850	Benjamin Brodie	Chemistry	"For his investigations on the chemical nature of wax, published in the Philosophical Transactions for 1848 and 1849."	
1850	Thomas Graham	Chemistry	"For his paper on the motion of gases, published in the Philosophical Transactions for 1849."	
1851	William Parsons	Astronomy	"For his observations on the nebulae published in the Philosophical Transactions for the year 1850."	
1851	George Newport	Entomology	"For his paper on the impregnation of the ovum in the amphibia (first series), published in the Philosophical Transactions for 1851."	
1852	James Prescott Joule	Physics	"For his paper on the mechanical equivalent of heat, printed in the Philosophical Transactions for 1850."	
1852	Thomas Henry Huxley	Biology	"For his papers on the anatomy and the affinities of the family of the Medusae, printed in the Philosophical Transactions."	
1853	Charles Darwin	Natural history	"For his work entitled Geological Observations on Coral Reefs, Volcanic Islands, and on South America, and his work, Fossil Circhipeda of Great Britain, Section Lepadidae, Monograph of the Circhipeda."	
1853	John Tyndall	Physics	"For his paper on diamagnetism and magne-crystallic action, published in the Philosophical Magazine in 1851. (the award of this medal was declined by Dr Tyndall)"	
1854	August Wilhelm von Hofmann	Chemistry	"For his researches in organic chemistry published in the Transactions of the Royal and Chemical Societies."	
1854	Joseph Dalton Hooker	Botany	"For his researches in various branches of science, especially in botany, as naturalist of the Antarctic expedition of Sir James Ross, and in an expedition to the eastern part of the Himalayan range; of which researches part has been published in works entitled The Antarctic Flora, and the Flora of New Zealand, and in various other communications, and part is now in course of publication."	
1855	John Obadiah Westwood	Entomology	"For his various monographs and papers on entomology."	
1855	John Russell Hind	Astronomy	"For the discovery of ten planetoids, the computation of their orbits, and various other astronomical discoveries."	
1856	John Richardson	Natural history	"For his contributions to natural history and physical geography."	
1856	William Thomson	Physics	"For his various chemical researches relating to electricity, to the motive power of heat, and to other subjects."	
1857	Edward Frankland	Chemistry	"For the isolation of the organic radicals of the alcohols, and for his researches on the metallic derivatives of alcohol."	
1857	John Lindley	Botany	"For his numerous researches and works on all branches of scientific botany, and especially for his vegetable kingdom, and his genera & species of Orchideae."	
1858	Albany Hancock	Biology	"For his various researches on the anatomy of the mollusca."	
1858	William Lassell	Astronomy	"For his various astronomical discoveries and researches."	
1859	Arthur Cayley	Mathematics	"For his mathematical papers published in the Philosophical Transactions, and in various English and foreign journals."	
1859	George Bentham	Botany	"For his important contributions to the advancement of systematic and descriptive botany."	
1860	Augustus Volney Waller	Neurophysiology	"For his investigations into the anatomy and physiology of the nervous system, and for the introduction of a valuable method of conducting such investigations."	
1860	William Fairbairn	Structural engineering	"For his various experimental inquiries on the properties of the materials employed in mechanical construction, contained in the Philosophical transactions, and in the publications of other scientific societies."	
1861	James Joseph Sylvester	Mathematics	"For his various memoirs and researches in mathematical science."	
1861	William Benjamin Carpenter	Physiology	"For his researches on the Foraminifera, contained in four memoirs in the Philosophical Transactions, his investigations into the structure of shell, his observations on the embryonic development of Purpura, and his various other writings in physiology and comparative anatomy"	
1862	Alexander William Williamson	Chemistry	"For his researches on the compound ethers, and his subsequent communications in organic chemistry."	
1862	John Thomas Romney Robinson	Astronomy	"For the Armagh catalogue of 5345 stars, deduced from observations made at the Armagh Observatory, from the years 1820 up to 1854; for his papers on the construction of astronomical instruments in the memoirs of the Astronomical Society, and his paper on electromagnets in the Transactions of the Royal Irish Academy."	
1863	John Peter Gassiot	Physics	"For his researches on the voltaic battery and current, and on the discharge of electricity through attenuated media."	
1863	Miles Berkeley	Botany	"For his researches in cryptogamic botany, especially mycology."	
1864	Jacob Lockhart Clarke	Anatomy	"For his researches on the intimate structure of the spinal cord and brain, and on the development of the spinal cord, published in five memoirs in the Philosophical Transactions and in other writings."	
1864	Warren De la Rue	Astronomy	"For his observations on the total eclipse of the Sun of 1860, and for his improvements in astronomical photography."	
1865	Archibald Smith	Mathematics	"For his papers in the Philosophical Transactions and elsewhere, on the magnetism of ships."	
1865	Joseph Prestwich	Geology	"For his numerous & valuable contributions to geological science and more especially for his papers published in the Philosophical Transactions on the general question of the excavation of river valleys, and on the superficial deposits in France and England in which the works of man are associated with the remains of extinct animals."	
1866	William Huggins	Astronomy	"For his researches on the spectra of some of the chemical elements and on the spectra of certain of the heavenly bodies; and especially for his researches on the spectra of the nebulae, published in the Philosophical Transactions."	
1866	William Kitchen Parker	Anatomy	"For his researches in comparative osteology, and more especially on the anatomy of the skull, as contained in papers published in the Transactions of the Zoological Society and the Philosophical Transactions."	
1867	John Bennet Lawes and Joseph Henry Gilbert	Chemistry	"For their researches in agricultural chemistry."	
1867	William Edmond Logan	Geology	"For his geological researches in Canada, and the construction of a geological map of that colony."	
1868	Alfred Russel Wallace	Zoology	"For his labours in practical and theoretical zoology."	
1868	George Salmon	Mathematics	"For his researches in analytical geometry and the theory of surfaces, published in the Philosophical Transactions, the Transactions of the Royal Irish Academy, and the Quarterly Journal of Mathematics."	
1869	Augustus Matthiessen	Chemistry	"For his researches on the electrical and other physical properties of metals and their alloys."	
1869	Thomas Maclear	Astronomy	"For his measurement of an arc of the meridian at the Cape of Good Hope."	
1870	Thomas Davidson	Paleontology	"For his works on the recent and fossil Brachiopoda, more especially his series of monographs in the publications of the Palaeontographical Society."	
1870	William Hallowes Miller	Mineralogy	"For his researches and writings on mineralogy and crystallography, and his scientific labours in the restoration of the National Standard of Weight."	
1871	George Busk	Zoology	"For his researches in zoology, physiology, and comparative anatomy."	
1871	John Stenhouse	Chemistry	"For his researches on the lichens & their proximate constituents and derivatives, including Erythrite; and for his researches on the action of charcoal in purifying air."	
1872	Henry John Carter	Zoology	"For his long continued and valuable researches in zoology, and more especially for his inquiries into the natural history of the Spongiadae."	
1872	Thomas Anderson	Chemistry	"For his investigations on the organic bases of Dippells animal oil; on codeine; on the crystallized constituents of opium; on piperin and on papaverin; and for his researches in physiological and animal chemistry."	
1873	George James Allman	Zoology	"For his researches in zoology, and especially for his memoirs on the structure, development, and physiology of the gymnoblastic hydroids."	
1873	Henry Enfield Roscoe	Chemistry	"For his various chemical investigations, especially fot those on the chemical action of light, and upon the element Vanadium and its combinations."	
1874	Henry Clifton Sorby	Geology	"For his researches on Slaty cleavage and on the minute structure of minerals and rocks; for the construction of the microspectroscope, and for his researches on colouring matters."	
1874	William Crawford Williamson	Paleontology	"For his contributions to zoology & palaeontology, & especially for his investigations into the structure of the fossil plants of the coal measures."	
1875	Thomas Oldham	Geology	"For his long & important services in the science of geology, first as Professor of Geology, Trin. Col. Dub. And Director of the Geol. Survey of Ireland & chiefly for the great work which he has long conducted as superintendent of the Geol. Survey of India, also for the series of volumes of geological reports and memoirs, including the Palaeontographica Indica published under his direction."	
1875	William Crookes	Chemistry	"For his various chemical and physical researches, more especially for his discovery of thallium, his investigation of its compounds and determination of its atomic weight; and for his discovery of the repulsion referable to radiation."	
1876	Charles Wyville Thomson	Zoology	"For his successful direction of the scientific investigations carried on by HMS Challenger."	
1876	William Froude	Hydrodynamics	"For his researches both theoretical and experimental on the behaviour of ships, their oscillations, their resistance, & propulsion."	
1877	Frederick Augustus Abel	Chemistry	"For his physico-chemical researches on gun cotton & explosive agents."	
1877	Oswald Heer	Natural History	"For his numerous researches & writings on the tertiary plants of Europe, of the North Atlantic, North Asia, and North America, and for his able generalizations respecting their affinities, and their geological & climatic relations."	
1878	Albert Gunther	Zoology	"For his numerous & valuable contributions to the zoology & anatomy of fishes & reptiles."	
1878	John Allan Broun	Meteorology	"For his investigations during thirty five years in magnetism and meteorology & for his improvements in methods of observation."	
1879	Andrew Crombie Ramsay	Geology	"For his long continued & successful labours in geology and physical geography."	
1879	William Henry Perkin	Chemistry	"For his synthetical & other researches in organic chemistry."	
1880	Andrew Noble	Physics	"For his researches into the action of explosives; his invention of the chronoscope; and other mathematical & physical inquiries."	
1880	Joseph Lister	Surgery	"For his contributions on various physiological & biological subjects published in the Philosophical Transactions & Proceedings of the Royal Society & elsewhere; and for his labours practical and theoretical, on questions relating to the antiseptic system of treatment in surgery."	
1881	John Hewitt Jellett	Mathematics	"For his various mathematical & physical papers, more especially for his researches in chemical optics, & his invention of the new and delicate analyser by which they were carried out."	
1881	Francis Maitland Balfour	Biology	"For his numerous and important contributions to animal morphology; and more especially for his investigations respecting the origin of the urogenital organs and the cerebrospinal nerves of the Vertebrata; and for his work on the development of the Elasmobranch fishes."	
1882	John Strutt	Physics	"For his various papers in mathematical and experimental physics."	
1882	William Henry Flower	Biology	"For his valuable contributions to the morphology and classification of the Mammalia and to anthropology."	
1883	Thomas Archer Hirst	Mathematics	"For his researches in pure mathematics."	
1883	John Scott Burdon-Sanderson	Physiology	"For the eminent services which he has rendered to physiology and pathology, especially for his investigation of the relations of micro-organisms to disease, and his researches on the electric phenomena of plants."	
1884	George Darwin	Mathematics	"For his mathematical investigations on the rigidity of the Earth, and on tides."	
1884	Daniel Oliver	Botany	"For his investigations in the classification of plants, and for the great services which he has rendered to taxonomic botany."	
1885	David Edward Hughes	Electrical engineering	"For his electric and magnetic researches, and his invention of the microphone & the induction balance."	
1885	Ray Lankester	Zoology	"For his discoveries concerning the embryology and morphology of the mollusca and his services to embryology & animal morphology in general."	
1886	Peter Guthrie Tait	Physics	"For his various mathematical and physical researches."	
1886	Francis Galton	Biology	"For his statistical inquiries into biological phenomena."	
1887	Alexander Ross Clarke	Geodesy	"For his comparison of standards of length and determination of the figure of the Earth."	
1887	Henry Nottidge Moseley	Natural history	"For his numerous researches in animal morphology, and especially his investigations."	
1888	Osborne Reynolds	Physics	"For his investigations in mathematical & experimental physics, and on the application of scientific theory to engineering."	
1888	Ferdinand von Mueller	Geography	"For his long services in Australian exploration and for his investigations of the flora of the Australian continent."	
1889	Thomas Edward Thorpe	Chemistry	"For his researches on fluorine compounds, and his determination of the atomic weights of titanium and gold."	
1889	Walter Holbrook Gaskell	Physiology	"For his researches in cardiac physiology and his important discoveries in the anatomy and physiology of the sympathetic nervous system."	
1890	John Hopkinson	Physics	"For his researches in magnetism and electricity."	
1890	David Ferrier	Neurology	"For his researches on the localisation of cerebral functions."	
1891	Arthur William Rucker	Physics	"For his researches on liquid films, and his contributions to our knowledge of terrestrial magnetism."	
1891	Charles Lapworth	Geology	"For his researches among the older rocks of Britain."	
1892	Charles Pritchard	Astronomy	"For his work on photometry and stellar parallax."	
1892	John Newport Langley	Physiology	"For his work on secreting glands, and on the nervous system."	
1893	Harry Marshall Ward	Botany	"For his researches into the life-history of fungi and schizomycetes."	
1893	Arthur Schuster	Physics	"For his spectroscopic inquiries, and his researches on disruptive discharge through gases and on terrestrial magnetism."	
1894	Joseph John Thomson	Physics	"For his contributions to mathematical and experimental physics especially to electrical theory."	
1894	Victor Horsley	Physiology	"For his investigations relating to the physiology of the nervous system, and of the thyroid gland, and to their applications to the treatment of disease."	
1895	John Murray	Oceanography	"For his services to biological science and oceanography in connection with the "Challenger" reports, and for his original contributions to the same."	
1895	James Alfred Ewing	Physics	"For his investigations on magnetic induction in iron and other metals.	
1896	Archibald Geikie	Geology	"For his many original contributions to geology especially those upon the Old Red Sandstone of Western Europe."	
1896	Charles Vernon Boys	Physics	"For his invention of Quartz Fibres and investigation of their properties, his improvement of the radio-micrometer and investigations with it, for developments in the art of instantaneous photography, and for his determination of the value of the constant of attraction."	
1897	Richard Strachey	Geology	"For his researches in geographical, meteorological, and botanical science."	
1897	Andrew Forsyth	Mathematics	"For his contributions to the progress of pure mathematics, and especially for his work in differential equations and the theory of functions."	
1898	John Kerr	Physics	"For his researches on the optical effect of electrical stress and on the reflection of light at the surface of a magnetised body."	
1898	Walter Gardiner	Botany	"For his researches on the protoplasmic connection of the cells of vegetable tissues and on the minute histology of plants."	
1899	William Carmichael McIntosh	Marine biology	"For his important monographs on British marine zoology and on the fishing industries."	
1899	George Francis Fitzgerald	Physics	"For his contributions to physical science, especially in the domains of optics and electricity."	
1900	Alfred Newton	Ornithology	"For his eminent contributions to the science of ornithology and the geographical distribution of animals."	
1900	Percy Alexander MacMahon	Mathematics	"For the number and range of his contributions to mathematical science"	
1901	William Edward Ayrton	Electrical engineering	"For his contributions to electrical science."	
1901	William Thomas Blanford	Geology	"For his work in connection with the geographical distribution of animals"	
1902	Edward Albert Schafer	Neurology	"For his researches into the functions and minute structure of the Central Nervous System, especially with regard to the motor and sensory functions of the cortex of the brain."	
1902	Horace Lamb	Applied mathematics	"For his investigations in mathematical physics."	
1903	David Gill	Astronomy	"For his researches in solar and stellar parallax, and his energetic direction of the Royal Observatory at the Cape of Good Hope."	
1903	Horace Tabberer Brown	Chemistry	"For his work on the chemistry of the carbohydrates and on the assimilation of carbonic acid by green plants."	
1904	David Bruce	Microbiology	"For his valuable researches in the pathology of Malta fever, nagana, and sleeping sickness, and especially for his discoveries as regards the exact causes of these diseases."	
1904	William Burnside	Mathematics	"For his researches in mathematics, particularly in the theory of groups."	
1905	Charles Scott Sherrington	Neurophysiology	"For his researches on the Central Nervous System especially in relation to reflex action."	
1905	John Henry Poynting	Physics	"For his researches in physical science, especially in connection with the constant of gravitation and the theories of electrodynamics and radiation."	
1906	Alfred George Greenhill	Mathematics	"For his contributions to mathematics, especially the elliptic functions and their applications."	
1906	Dukinfield Henry Scott	Botany	"For his investigations and discoveries in connection with the structure and relationship of fossil plants."	
1907	Ernest William Hobson	Mathematics	"On the ground of his investigations in mathematics."	
1907	Ramsay Heatley Traquair	Natural history	"On the ground of his discoveries relating to fossil fishes."	
1908	Henry Head	Neurology	"On the ground of his researches on the relations between the visceral & somatic nerves and on the functions of the different nerves."	
1908	John Milne	Geology	"On the ground of his work in seismology."	
1909	Augustus Love	Mathematics	"On the ground of his researches in the theory of elasticity and cognate subjects."	
1909	Ronald Ross	Medicine	"On the ground of his researches in connection with malaria."	
1910	Frederick Orpen Bower	Botany	"On the ground of his treatise on the origin of a land flora."	
1910	John Joly	Geology	"On the ground of researches in physics and geology."	
1911	George Chrystal	Mathematics	"On the ground of his work in mathematics and physics."	
1911	William Maddock Bayliss	Physiology	"On the ground of his researches in physiology."	
1912	Grafton Elliot Smith	Anatomy	no rationale given	
1912	William Mitchinson Hicks	Physics	"On the ground of his researches in mathematical physics."	
1913	Ernest Henry Starling	Physiology	"On the ground of his contributions to the advancement of physiology."	
1913	Harold Baily Dixon	Chemistry	"On the ground of his eminence in physical chemistry, especially in connexion with explosions in gases."	
1914	Ernest William Brown	Astronomy	"For investigations in astronomy, chiefly in the lunar theory."	
1914	William Johnson Sollas	Geology	"For researches in palaeontology."	
1915	Joseph Larmor	Mathematics	"On the ground of his numerous and important contributions to mathematical and physical science."	
1915	William Halse Rivers Rivers	Ethnology	"On the ground of his important contributions to ethnography and ethnology."	
1916	Hector Munro Macdonald	Mathematics	"For his contributions to mathematical physics."	
1916	John Scott Haldane	Physiology	"For his distinguished services to chemical physiology, more especially in reference to the chemical changes in respiration."	
1917	Arthur Smith Woodward	Palaeontology	"On the ground of his researches in vertebrate palaeontology."	
1917	John Aitken	Meteorology	"On the ground of his work on cloudy condensations."	
1918	Alfred Fowler	Astronomy	"For his distinguished researches in physical astronomy and spectroscopy."	
1918	Frederick Gowland Hopkins	Biochemistry	"On the ground of his researches in chemical physiology."	
1919	James Hopwood Jeans	Mathematics	"On the ground of his researches in applied mathematics."	
1919	John Bretland Farmer	Botany	"On the ground of his notable work on plant and animal cytology."	
1920	Godfrey Harold Hardy	Mathematics	"On the ground of his researches in pure mathematics."	
1920	William Bateson	Genetics	"On the ground of his contributions to biological science, and especially his studies in genetics."	
1921	Frank Watson Dyson	Astronomy	"For his researches on the distribution and movement of the stars."	
1921	Frederick Blackman	Botany	"For his researches on the gaseous exchange in plants & on the operation of limiting factors."	
1922	Charles Thomson Rees Wilson	Meteorology	"For his researches on condensation nuclei and atmospheric electricity."	
1922	Joseph Barcroft	Physiology	"For his researches in physiology and especially for his work in connection with respiration."	
1923	Charles James Martin	Physiology	"For his researches on animal metabolism"	
1923	Napier Shaw	Meteorology	"For his researches in meteorological science"	
1924	Dugald Clerk	Engineering	"For his application of scientific principles to engineering problems."	
1924	Henry Hallett Dale	Pharmacology	"For his researches in pharmacology and physiology."	
1925	Albert Seward	Botany	"For his researches on the palaeobotany of Gondwanaland."	
1925	William Henry Perkin Jr.	Organic chemistry	"For his work on the constitution of the alkaloids carried out during the past few years."	
1926	Archibald Hill	Physiology	"For his distinguished work on the physical and chemical aspects of muscular contraction."	
1926	William Bate Hardy	Biochemistry	"For his pioneer work on colloidal chemistry and the theory of lubrication."	
1927	John Cunningham McLennan	Physics	"For his researches in spectroscopy and atomic physics."	
1927	Thomas Lewis	Cardiology	"For his researches on the vascular system, following upon his earlier work on the mammalian heart-beat."	
1928	Arthur Eddington	Astrophysics	"For his contributions to astrophysics."	
1928	Robert Broom	Palaeontology	"For his discoveries which have shed new light on the problem of the origin of mammals."	
1929	John Edensor Littlewood	Mathematics	"For his work on mathematical analysis and the theory of prime numbers."	
1929	Robert Muir	Pathology	"For his contributions to the science of immunology."	
1930	John Edward Marr	Geology	"For his pioneer work in the accurate zoning of the palaeozoic rocks."	
1930	Owen Willans Richardson	Physics	"For his work on thermionics and spectroscopy."	
1931	Richard Glazebrook	Physics	"For his distinguished work in experimental physics."	
1931	William Henry Lang	Botany	"For his work on the anatomy and morphology of the fern-like fossils of the Old Red Sandstone."	
1932	Edward Mellanby	Pharmacology	"For his important researches on dietary factors, particularly in connexion with rickets."	
1932	Robert Robinson	Chemistry	"For his work in many branches of organic chemistry, especially on the structure of plant products and their phytochemical synthesis."	
1933	Geoffrey Ingram Taylor	Physics	"For his mathematical work in physics, geophysics and aerodynamics."	
1933	Patrick Playfair Laidlaw	Virology	"For his work on diseases due to viruses, including that on the cause and prevention of distemper in dogs."	
1934	Edgar Douglas Adrian	Electrophysiology	"For his work on the physiology of nerve and its application to the problems of sensation."	
1934	Sydney Chapman	Geophysics	"For his researches in the kinetic theory of gases, in terrestrial magnetism and in the phenomena of the upper atmosphere."	
1935	Alfred Harker	Petrology	"In recognition of his distinguished work and influence as a petrologist."	
1935	Charles Galton Darwin	Physics	"For his researches in mathematical physics, especially in the quantum mechanics of the electron and in optics."	
1936	Edwin Stephen Goodrich	Zoology	"For his work on the morphology of the excretory organs of the invertebrate and for his work on the comparative anatomy and embryology of the vertebrata."	
1936	Ralph Howard Fowler	Physics	"For his work on statistical mechanics and allied departments of modern mathematical physics."	
1937	Arthur Henry Reginald Buller	Biology	"In recognition of his researches on the general biology and sexuality of the fungi."	
1937	Nevil Vincent Sidgwick	Chemistry	"In recognition of his distinguished work on valency and on molecular structure."	
1938	Francis William Aston	Physics	"For his discovery of the isotopes of non-radioactive elements."	
1938	Ronald Aylmer Fisher	Statistics	"For his important contributions to the theory and practice of statistical methods."	
1939	David Keilin	Entomology	"For his contributions to biochemistry and entomology; in particular for his demonstration of the part played by cytochrome in the oxidation-reduction mechanisms of the living cell; and for his studies of the higher diptera."	
1939	Paul Dirac	Physics	"For the leading part he had taken in the development of the new quantum mechanics."	
1940	Francis Hugh Adam Marshall	Physiology	"For his contributions to the physiology of animal reproduction."	
1940	Patrick Maynard Stuart Blackett	Physics	"For his studies of cosmic rays and the showers of particles which they produce, for his share in the discovery of the positive electron, for his work on mesons and many other experimental achievements."	
1941	Ernest Kennaway	Pathology	"For his discovery of the nature of the carcinogenic substances in coal tar and for his investigations on production of cancer by synthetic substances."	
1941	Edward Arthur Milne	Astrophysics	"For his researches on the atmospheres of the earth and the sun, on the internal constitution of the stars, and on the theory of relativity."	
1942	William Whiteman Carlton Topley	Bacteriology	"For his outstanding work on experimental epidemiology and immunology."	
1942	Walter Norman Haworth	Chemistry	"For his fundamental contributions to organic chemistry, particularly to the constitution of the sugars and the structure of complex polysaccharides."	
1943	Edward Battersby Bailey	Geology	"For his distinguished contributions to the knowledge of mountain structure and his studies on the tectonics of vulcanism."	
1943	Harold Spencer Jones	Astronomy	"For his determination of the solar parallax and of other fundamental astronomical constants."	
1944	Charles Robert Harington	Chemistry	"For his work in the analysis and synthesis of thyroxine, and in immunological chemistry."	
1944	David Brunt	Meteorology	"For his fundamental contributions to meteorology."	
1945	Edward James Salisbury	Botany	"For his notable contributions to plant ecology and to the study of the British flora generally."	
1945	John Desmond Bernal	Crystallography	"For his work on the structure of proteins and other substances by X-ray methods and for the solution of many other problems requiring a physical approach."	
1946	Cyril Dean Darlington	Biology	"For his distinguished researches in cytology and genetics."	
1946	Lawrence Bragg	Physics	"For his distinguished researches in the sciences of X-ray structure analysis and X-ray spectroscopy."	
1947	Frank Macfarlane Burnet	Virology	"For his distinguished work on bacteriophages, viruses and immunity; and for his contributions to the study of infectious disease as an ecological phenomenon."	
1947	Cyril Norman Hinshelwood	Chemistry	"For his distinguished work on the mechanism of chemical reactions from the simplest gas phase processes to the complexities of cell division."	
1948	James Gray	Zoology	"For his distinguished researches in cytology, ciliary movement, and particularly his anatomical and experimental studies of animal posture and locomotion."	
1948	Harold Jeffreys	Geophysics	"For his distinguished work in geophysics and his important contributions to the astronomy of the solar system.	
1949	Rudolph Albert Peters	Biochemistry	"For his distinguished biochemical researches, in particular his investigations of (i) the biochemical role of vitamin B1 in tissue metabolism; and (ii) the mechanism of the toxic action of lewisite and other arsenical compounds."	
1949	George Paget Thomson	Physics	"For his distinguished contributions to many branches of atomic physics, and especially for his work in establishing the wave properties of the electron."	
1950	Carl Frederick Abel Pantin	Zoology	"For his contributions to the comparative physiology of the Invertebrata, particularly his work on nerve conduction in Crustacea and Actinozoa."	
1950	Edward Appleton	Physics	"For his work on the ele [sic] transmission of electromagnetic waves round the earth and for his investigations of the ionic state of the upper atmosphere."	
1951	Howard Florey	Pharmacology	"In recognition of his distinguished contributions to pathology by his studies of the functions of mucin and by his work on penicillin and other antibiotics."	
1951	Ian Heilbron	Chemistry	"In recognition of his distinguished contributions to organic chemistry, notably in the field of vitamin A and polyene synthesis."	
1952	Frederic Bartlett	Experimental psychology	"In recognition of his creation of an experimental school of psychology which has established under his leadership an outstanding position recognized internationally as without superior."	
1952	Christopher Kelk Ingold	Chemistry	"In recognition of his extensive theoretical and practical studies of the mechanism of organic chemical reactions and the factors influencing them; and for his analysis of the structure of benzene."	
1953	Paul Fildes	Microbiology	"In recognition of his classical researches on growth factors for bacteria and for laying the foundation of work leading to a rational approach to chemotherapy."	
1953	Nevill Francis Mott	Physics	"In recognition of his eminent work in the field of quantum theory and particularly in the theory of metals."	
1954	Hans Adolf Krebs	Biochemistry	"In recognition of his discovery of two key reactions in animal metabolism and for his distinguished contributions to the knowledge of cell energetics."	
1954	John Cockcroft	Physics	"In recognition of his distinguished work on nuclear and atomic physics."	
1955	Vincent Wigglesworth	Entomology	"In recognition of his distinguished experimental contributions of outstanding value to many aspects of insect physiology."	
1955	Alexander Todd	Biochemistry	"In recognition of his distinguished work in organic chemistry."	
1956	Owen Thomas Jones	Geology	"In recognition of his distinguished studies in the Palaeozoic rocks, particularly in Wales, his work on sediments, his palaeontological researches and the application of geological knowledge to practical problems."	
1956	Dorothy Mary Crowfoot Hodgkin	Chemistry	"In recognition of her distinguished work in the elucidation of structures of penicillin, vitamin B12 and other important compounds by the methods of X-ray crystallography."	
1957	Frederick Gugenheim Gregory	Botany	"In recognition of his distinguished studies in plant physiology."	
1957	William Vallance Douglas Hodge	Mathematics	"In recognition of his distinguished work on algebraic geometry."	
1958	Alan Lloyd Hodgkin	Physiology	"In recognition of his distinguished work on the mechanism of excitation and conduction in nerve and muscle."	
1958	Harrie Stewart Wilson Massey	Physics	"In recognition of his distinguished contributions to physics, and particularly for his experimental and theoretical studies of collision phenomena in gases."	
1959	Peter Brian Medawar	Physiology	"In recognition of his distinguished contributions in the field of tissue transplantation immunity and acquired tolerance."	
1959	Rudolf Peierls	Physics	"In recognition of his distinguished work on the theoretical foundations of high energy and nuclear physics."	
1960	Roy Cameron	Pathology	"In recognition of his distinguished contributions in the field of cellular pathology"	
1960	Bernard Lovell	Physics	"In recognition of his distinguished contributions to radio astronomy."	
1961	Wilfrid Le Gros Clark	Physiology	"In recognition of his outstanding contributions to neuroanatomy and primate morphology, which he has combined to provide new knowledge of human evolution."	
1961	Cecil Frank Powell	Physics	"In recognition of his pioneering work on the development of the photographic emulsion technique in the investigation of cosmic rays and the outstanding results derived therefrom on the elementary particles in cosmic radiation."	
1962	John Carew Eccles	Neurophysiology	"In recognition of his distinguished investigations of the function of the spinal cord, particularly of the mechanisms of excitation and inhibition."	
1962	Subrahmanyan Chandrasekhar	Astrophysics	"In recognition of his distinguished researches in mathematical physics, particularly those related to the stability of convective motions in fluids with and without magnetic fields."	
1963	Herbert Harold Read	Geology	"In recognition of his outstanding contributions to the understanding of the processes of rock metamorphism and the origins of granite."	
1963	Robert Hill	Biochemistry	"In recognition of his distinguished work in biochemistry of plants, especially for his contributions to knowledge of photosynthesis."	
1964	Francis Brambell	Medicine	"In recognition of his important contribution to our understanding of the passage of protein from maternal to foetal circulations."	
1964	Michael James Lighthill	Aeroacoustics	"In recognition of his distinguished contributions to knowledge of the flow of compressible gases, and the mathematical theory of distributions."	
1965	Henry Charles Husband	Engineering	"In recognition of his distinguished work in many aspects of engineering, particularly for his design studies of large structures such as those exemplified in the radio telescopes at Jodrell Bank and Goonhilly Downs."	
1965	John Cowdery Kendrew	Crystallography	"In recognition of his distinguished contributions to the complete structural analysis of a protein molecule (myoglobin), particularly the biological aspects of this study."	
1965	Raymond Arthur Lyttleton	Astronomy	"In recognition of his distinguished contributions to astronomy, particularly for his work on the dynamical stability of galaxies."	
1966	Christopher Cockerell	Engineering	"In recognition of his pioneering invention, and major contributions to the subsequent development of hovercraft."	
1966	Frank Yates	Statistical biology	"In recognition of his profound and far-reaching contributions to the statistical methods of experimental biology."	
1966	John Ashworth Ratcliffe	Physics	"In recognition of his distinguished studies in the ionosphere and on the propagation of radio waves."	
1967	Joseph Hutchinson	Biology	"In recognition of his distinguished work on the genetics and evolution of crop-plants with particular reference to cotton."	
1967	John Zachary Young	Neurophysiology	"In recognition of his outstanding researches correlating neural structure with function."	
1967	Cecil Edgar Tilley	Petrology	"In recognition of his many distinguished contributions in all branches of retrology."	
1968	Gilbert Roberts	Engineering	"In recognition of his distinguished contributions to civil engineering, and in particular to the design and construction of long-span suspension bridges."	
1968	Walter Thomas James Morgan	Biochemistry	"In recognition of his outstanding contributions to knowledge of the chemistry of blood-group substances, with special reference to genetical as well as immunological considerations."	
1968	Michael Francis Atiyah	Mathematics	"In recognition of his distinguished contributions to algebraic geometry and to the study of differential equations by the methods of algebraic topology."	
1969	Charles William Oatley	Electrical engineering	"In recognition of his distinguished work in the wartime development of radar and latterly for the design and development of a highly successful scanning electron microscope."	
1969	Frederick Sanger	Biochemistry	"In recognition of his pioneer work on the sequence of amino acids in proteins and of nucleotides of ribonucleic acids."	
1969	George Edward Raven Deacon	Oceanography	"In recognition of his distinguished contributions to physical oceanography and for his leadership as director of the National Institute of Oceanography."	
1970	John Fleetwood Baker	Engineering	"In recognition of his fundamental and applied work on the plastic behaviour and design of framed structures which is now being used throughout the world."	
1970	William Albert Hugh Rushton	Physiology	"In recognition of his distinguished work on the visual pigments in the living eye and on chemical and nervous adaptation in the retina."	
1970	Kingsley Charles Dunham	Geology	"In recognition of his distinguished contributions to pure and applied geology, and especially in the field of metallic ore deposits."	
1971	Percy Edward Kent	Geology	"In recognition of his distinguished contributions to oil and gas exploration and the geology of oil and gas fields."	
1971	Max Perutz	Biology	"In recognition of his pioneering work on the molecular biology and structure of proteins."	
1971	Gerhard Herzberg	Physics	"In recognition of his distinguished experimental researches in atomic and molecular spectroscopy and its applications in chemistry, physics and astronomy."	
1972	Wilfrid Bennett Lewis	Nuclear physics	"In recognition of his distinguished contributions to the science and technology of heavy water reactors for power generation."	
1972	Francis Crick	Biology	"In recognition of his elucidation of the structure of DNA and his continuing contribution to molecular biology."	
1972	Derek Barton	Chemistry	"In recognition of his distinguished contributions to organic chemistry, especially his theories on the conformation of organic molecules and his syntheses of natural products."	
1973	Edward Penley Abraham	Biology	"In recognition of his outstanding work on the isolation, characterization and development of the cephalosporin group of antibiotics."	
1973	Rodney Robert Porter	Biology	"In recognition of his penetrating investigations on the structure of immunoglobulins."	
1973	Martin Ryle	Astronomy	"In recognition of his distinguished contributions to radioastronomy."	
1974	Sydney Brenner	Biology	"In recognition of his distinguished contributions to molecular biology concerning the nature of the genetic code and its expression during development."	
1974	George Edwards	Engineering	"In recognition of his many contributions to aeronautical engineering, particularly in the realization of supersonic aircraft."	
1974	Fred Hoyle	Physics	"In recognition of his distinguished contributions to theoretical physics and cosmology."	
1975	Barnes Wallis	Engineering	"In recognition of the originality of his ideas and the determination with which he has pursued them."	
1975	David Chilton Phillips	Biology	"In recognition of his solution of the three-dimensional structure of an enzyme and his outstanding contributions to the techniques of x-ray crystallography."	
1975	Edward Bullard	Geophysics	"In recognition of his distinction as a world leader in geophysics, especially the generation of the earths magnetic field, the origin of the oceans and continental drift."	
1976	Alan Walsh	Physics	"In recognition of his distinguished contributions to emission and infra-red spectroscopy and his origination of the atomic absorption method of quantitative analysis."	
1976	James Learmonth Gowans	Medicine	"In recognition of his distinguished research in the field of immunology, especially as regards the recirculation and immunological role of lymphocytes"	
1976	John Warcup Cornforth	Chemistry	"In recognition of his fundamental contribution to the stereochemical unravelling of the biosynthesis of squalene and cholesterol from acetate and mevalonate."	
1977	John Bertram Adams	Physics	"In recognition of his outstanding contributions to the design and operation of high-energy particle accelerators."	
1977	Hugh Esmor Huxley	Biology	"In recognition of his distinguished research on the structure of muscle and on the molecular mechanisms of contraction."	
1977	Peter Hirsch	Materials science	"In recognition of his distinguished studies of defects in crystals and especially of his elucidation of the process of work hardening."	
1978	Tom Kilburn	Engineering	"In recognition of his outstanding individual and continuing contribution to the development of computer hardware in the United Kingdom over the last thirty years."	
1978	Roderic Alfred Gregory	Biology	"In recognition of his distinguished studies of the biological activity of peptide hormones in relation to their structure."	
1978	Abdus Salam	Physics	"In recognition of his outstanding contributions to the physics of elementary particles with special reference to the unification of the electromagnetic and weak interactions."	
1979	Vernon Ellis Cosslett	Physics	"In recognition of his outstanding contributions to the design and development of the X-ray microscope, the scanning electron microprobe analyser, the high voltage and ultrahigh resolution (2.5A) electron microscopes and their applications in many disciplines."	
1979	Hans Walter Kosterlitz	Biology	"In recognition of his distinguished work on narcotics leading to the discovery in 1975 of the enkephalins."	
1979	Charles Frank	Physics	"In recognition of his outstanding original contributions to the theory of crystal growth, dislocations, phase transformations and polymers, with wide applications in physics, chemistry and geology."	
1980	John Paul Wild	Astronomy	"In recognition of his conception of the basic principles of the Interscan aircraft instrument landing system and the guidance of its development to a successful conclusion."	
1980	Henry Harris	Medicine	"In recognition of his development of cell fusion for the study of somatic-cell genetics and differentiation including the genetic control of malignancy."	
1980	Denys Wilkinson	Physics	"In recognition of his highly original research in nuclear physics and of his outstanding contributions on giant resonances, radiative widths, second-class beta decay and the fundamental symmetries of nuclear interactions and also on instrumentation."	
1981	Ralph Riley	Genetics	"In recognition of his distinguished contributions to understanding the genetics of wheat and the development of new methods of producing improved varieties."	
1981	Marthe Louise Vogt	Neuroscience	"In recognition of her important contributions to synaptic biochemistry and pharmacology which are fundamental to modern neuropharmacology."	
1981	Geoffrey Wilkinson	Chemistry	"In recognition of his distinguished contributions to preparative inorganic chemistry and in particular to the synthesis and application of organometallic compounds."	
1982	César Milstein	Biochemistry	"In recognition of his fundamental contribution to understanding the structure and genetic control of immunoglobulins; his hybridoma technique for producing monoclonal antibodies has revolutionized the potential practical applications of immunology."	
1982	William Hawthorne	Engineering	"In recognition of his outstanding contributions to engineering thermodynamics and fluid mechanics, and particularly the internal aerodynamics of turbomachines."	
1982	Richard Henry Dalitz	Physics	"In recognition of his outstanding contributions to particle physics, particularly in relation to the properties of strange particles."	
1983	Daniel Joseph Bradley	Physics	"In recognition of his development of the techniques of generating ultra-short light pulses from lasers, and of picosecond streak cameras."	
1983	Wilhelm Siegmund Feldberg	Biology	"In recognition of his contributions to elucidating the nature of chemical synaptic transmission in nervous systems and the regulating effects of hormones in peripheral systems."	
1983	John Kingman	Mathematics	"In recognition of his distinguished researches on queuing theory, on regenerative phenomena, and on mathematical genetics."	
1984	Alexander Lamb Cullen	Electrical engineering	"In recognition of his many distinguished contributions to microwave engineering, both theoretical and experimental, and in particular for research on microwave antennae."	
1984	Mary Lyon	Genetics	"In recognition of her distinguished contributions to the discovery of X-chromosome inactivation as a mechanism of gene dosage compensation."	
1984	Alan Battersby	Chemistry	"In recognition of his distinguished contributions to the elucidation of the pathway for the biosynthesis of complex natural products."	
1985	John Argyris	Engineering	"For his great contribution to the development of finite element analysis and its application to the solution of engineering problems."	
1985	John Bertrand Gurdon	Biology	"For his outstanding contributions to the techniques of nuclear transplantation and the use of the amphibian egg for investigations on replication, transcription and translation of genes."	
1985	Roger Penrose	Physics	"For his fundamental contributions to the theory of gravitational collapse and to other geometric aspects of theoretical physics."	
1986	Eric Ash	Electrical engineering	"In recognition of his outstanding researches on acoustic microscopy leading to wholly new techniques and substantial improvements in resolution of acoustic microscopes."	
1986	Richard Doll	Physiology	"In recognition of his pioneering use of statistical and epidemiological techniques to evaluate environmental factors in disease, notably that cigarette smoking causes lung cancer, heart disease and bronchitis."	
1986	Rex Richards	Chemistry	"In recognition of his many contributions, both theoretical and instrumental, to nuclear magnetic resonance."	
1987	Gustav Victor Rudolf Born	Pharmacology	"In recognition of his major contributions to the physiology, pathology and pharmacology of platelets and of his widely used methods for studying platelet function in haemostasis and thrombosis."	
1987	Eric James Denton	Marine biology	"In recognition of his outstanding contributions to the physiology of marine animals, to marine biology generally, and his leadership of U.K. marine science."	
1987	Francis Graham-Smith	Astronomy	"In recognition of his outstanding contributions to radio- and optical-astronomy."	
1988	Harold Barlow	Engineering	"In recognition of his distinguished research, particularly on microwaves and waveguides, and of his lasting influence as the founder of an unusually productive research school."	
1988	Winifred Watkins	Biochemistry	"In recognition of her fundamental contributions towards an understanding of the biochemical genetics of carbohydrate antigens on cell surfaces and in secreted glycoproteins."	
1988	George Batchelor	Mathematics	"In recognition of his distinguished work on the theory of turbulence and turbulent diffusion, and the theory of microhydrodynamics and colloidal suspensions."	
1989	John Vane	Pharmacology	"In recognition of his development of techniques to detect and monitor substances in the blood that regulate the circulation, and their application to the treatment of vascular and ischaemic conditions."	
1989	David Weatherall	Medicine	"In recognition of his pioneering work on the clinical and molecular basis of the thalassaemias, and fundamental contributions to the unravelling of their heterogeneity."	
1989	John Charles Polanyi	Chemistry	"In recognition of his pioneering work on the electromagnetic radiation emitted from chemical charges, leading to the basis of the chemical laser process."	
1990	Olgierd Cecil Zienkiewicz	Engineering	"In recognition of his pioneering development of the finite element method as a general procedure of solving problems of engineering physics and for demonstrating its success in applications to stress analysis, fluid mechanics, electromagnetics and many other situations."	
1990	Anne McLaren	Developmental biology	"In recognition of her distinguished research on mammalian embryology, particularly for providing much of the scientific basis for in vitro fertilization and embryo transfer, and for analysing sex determination in mammals."	
1990	Michael Berry	Physics	"In recognition of his deep and innovatory researches in classical and quantum physics, especially the discovery of the "Berry phase"."	
1991	John Mason	Physics	"In recognition of his distinguished research on cloud physics and, as Director-General of the Meteorological Office, his broadening and strengthening of research in meteorology in the UK."	
1991	Michael Berridge	Biology	"In recognition of his discovery that inositol 1,4,5-trisphosphate functions as a second messenger to mobilize calcium."	
1991	Dan McKenzie	Geophysics	"In recognition of his seminal role in developing a quantitative understanding of a wide range of geophysical and geological processes, including plate tectonics, mantle convection, continental deformation and melt segregation."	
1992	David Tabor	Physics	"for his seminal contributions to the basic study of friction and wear between solids, of considerable relevance to the design of machines."	
1992	Anthony Epstein	Medicine	"distinguished for the isolation of the Epstein-Barr virus which is closely associated with Burkitts lymphoma."	
1992	Simon Donaldson	Mathematics	"distinguished for his work which has revolutionized our understanding of four-dimensional geometry."	
1993	Rodney Hill	Applied mathematics	"for his outstanding contribution to the theoretical mechanics of solids, and especially the plasticity of solids."	
1993	Horace Barlow	Neuroscience	"for his outstanding and original contributions to electrophysiological, computational and psychophysical study of visual sensation and perception."	
1993	Volker Heine	Physics	"In recognition of his contributions to solid state theory, in particular the bonding and structure of solids."	
1994	Salvador Moncada	Pharmacology	"for his contributions to pharmacology and the discovery of basic mechanisms of signal transmission relevant to drug action."	
1994	Eric Mansfield	Aeronautics	"for his many fundamental and analytical contributions to our knowledge of advanced aeronautical structures, and more recently to the biological sciences."	
1994	Sivaramakrishna Chandrasekhar	Physics	"his many new discoveries in the understanding of liquid crystals, for a synthesis of the subject of his seminal book, "The invention of discotic liquid crystals", and for elucidating their remarkable properties."	
1995	Donald Metcalf	Medicine	"In recognition of his discovery of colony stimulating factors which regulate the growth and differentiation of normal hematopoietic and leukemic cells."	
1995	Paul Nurse	Biochemistry	"In recognition of his work on the control of the cell cycle in eukaryotic cells by his discovery of the identity and function of genes that regulate the key control points in the process of cell proliferation."	
1995	Robert J P Williams	Chemistry	"In recognition of his contributions in clearly presenting the role of inorganic elements in biological systems."	
1996	Robert Hinde	Zoology	"In recognition of his contributions to the field of animal behaviour and the dominant influence it achieved on the emerging field of ethology."	
1996	Jack Heslop-Harrison	Botany	"In recognition of his pioneering work in plant reproductive biology, in particular the areas of taxonomy and ecology, whole plant physiology, development of sub-cellular systems in somatic and reproductive cells, pollen/stigma interactions and acto/myosin transport systems within the pollen tube."	
1996	Andrew Wiles	Mathematics	"In recognition of his achievements in number theory, in particular Fermats Last Theorem and his achievements in algebraic number theory particularly the celebrated main conjecture on cyclotomic fields."	
1997	Geoffrey Eglinton	Chemistry	"In recognition of his contribution to our understanding of the way in which chemicals move from the living biosphere to the fossil geosphere, in particular the origin, genesis, maturation and migration of oil which has had great repercussions on the petroleum industry."	
1997	John Maynard Smith	Biology	"In recognition of his theoretical contributions to evolutionary biology, combining mathematics and biology to develop a sound understanding in such fields as population dynamics, paleobiology, ethology, behavioural ecology, bacteriology and genetics."	
1997	Donald Hill Perkins	Physics	"In recognition of his contributions to experimental particle physics, in particular the elucidation of the structure of the nucleon on the basis of observations of neutrino interactions, the quark substructure of the nucleon, and production of the first quantitative evidence for the validity of Quantum Chromodynamics (QCD)."	
1998	Edwin Southern	Biochemistry	"In recognition of his development of the method of transferring spatial patterns of DNA fragments from the electrophoretic separation medium to membranes on which the hybridisation could occur known as southern blotting, now a fundamental technique in molecular biology."	
1998	Ricardo Miledi	Neuroscience	"In recognition of his many important discoveries in cellular and molecular physiology which have greatly advanced our knowledge of synaptic transmission in the nervous system and of long-term effects of trophic interaction between neurones and effector cells."	
1998	Donald Charlton Bradley	Chemistry	"In recognition of his pioneering work on the molecular chemistry of metal-alkoxides and metal-amides, their synthesis, structure and bonding, and for his studies of their conversions to metal-oxides and metal-nitrides, processes which now find common place applications in materials science, especially in the fields of microelectronics and chemical vapour deposition."	
1999	John Frank Davidson	Chemistry	"In recognition of his distinguished work over many years in chemical engineering, including fluid flow, process dynamics, gas absorption and fluidization technology which has been concerned with real problems of industrial significance."	
1999	Patrick David Wall	Neuroscience	"In recognition of his fundamental contributions to our knowledge of the somatosensory system and, in particular, pain mechanisms, where his insights led to the therapeutic use of electrical stimulation of peripheral nerves, dorsal columns of the spinal cord, and brain stem for the control of pain, methods that are now in widespread use."	
1999	Archibald Howie	Physics	"In recognition of his outstanding contributions to the development and application of electron microscopy of materials, and to the underlying theories of electron scattering, in particular his extensive contributions to inelastic scattering theory, his systematic high resolution microscope studies of amorphous materials, his introduction of the concept of coherence volume for hollow cone dark field imaging and his pioneering use of a high angle annular dark field detector to image small catalyst particles."	
2000	Timothy Berners-Lee	Computer science	"In recognition of his invention and subsequent development of the World Wide Web, designing the universal resource locator (URL), an addressing system to give each Web page a unique location and the two protocols HTTP and HTML."	
2000	Geoffrey Burnstock	Neuroscience	"In recognition of his development of new hypotheses challenging the accepted views on autonomic neurotransmission, leading to new advances in the understanding of purinergic neurotransmission."	
2000	Keith Usherwood Ingold	Chemistry	"In recognition of his work in elucidating the mechanism of reactions involving free radicals."	
2001	Richard Gardner	Biology	"In recognition of his pioneering work on microsurgery of the mouse blastocyst which laid the foundation for major advances in biological knowledge, both in developmental biology and in understanding of gene function."	
2001	Gabriel Horn	Biology	"In recognition of his work on the neurobiological mechanisms of behavioural imprinting, embracing molecular, cellular, anatomical, electrophysiological and ethological approaches to learning and memory."	
2001	Sam Edwards	Physics	"In recognition of his enormous influence across a wide spectrum of physical sciences, particularly theoretical condensed matter physics."	
2002	Richard Peto	Mathematics	"In recognition of his outstanding work on the epidemiology of smoking and chronic disease."	
2002	Suzanne Cory	Genetics	"In recognition of her distinguished work on the molecular basis of cancer. She pioneered the use of transgenic mice to elucidate the role of various oncogenes in lymphoid malignancies."	
2002	Ray Freeman	Chemistry	"In recognition of his seminal contributions to the development and understanding of nuclear magnetic resonance (NMR) methods"	
2003	John Skehel	Virology	"In recognition of his pioneering research into virology. His studies and discoveries in the mechanisms by which influenza virus binds to the host cell, and in virus-cell membrane fusion have had a fundamental impact on the field."	
2003	Kenneth Johnson	Engineering	"In recognition of his outstanding work in the field of contact mechanics. His work his characterised by elegant experiments, skilful analyses and insightful explanations of observed phenomena."	
2003	Nicholas Shackleton	Geology	"in recognition of his seminal contributions to the fields of paleoceanography and geochemistry."	
2004	James Black	Chemistry	"In recognition of his work in both academia and industry, pioneering a new era of rational drug discovery."	
2004	Alec Jeffreys	Genetics	"In recognition of his outstanding discoveries and inventions which have had major impacts on large areas of genetics. "	
2004	Jack Lewis	Chemistry	"In recognition of his distinguished career in the field of inorganic chemistry over the last 50 years, mainly in the area of the transition elements."	
2005	Michael Pepper	Physics	"In recognition of his work which has had the highest level of influence in condensed matter physics and has resulted in the creation of the modern field of semiconductor nanostructures."	
2005	Anthony Pawson	Biology	"In recognition of his discoveries which have revealed the principles underlying cell signalling, and have been pivotal in understanding pathological states such as cancer."	
2005	Michael Fisher	Physics	"In recognition of his seminal contributions to wetting transitions, dislocation melting and criticality of ionic solutions and many other topics in Statistical Mechanics."	
2006	David Baulcombe	Botany	"In recognition of his profoundly significant recent discoveries for not only plants but for all of biology and for medicine."	
2006	Tim Hunt	Biochemistry	"discovering a key aspect of cell cycle control, the protein cyclin which is a component of cyclin dependent kinases, demonstrating his ability to grasp the significance of the result outside his immediate sphere of interest."	
2006	John Pendry	Physics	"In recognition of his seminal contributions in surface sciences, disordered systems, photonics and most recently in metamaterials and the concept of the perfect lens."	
2007	Tomas Lindahl	Medicine	"making fundamental contributions to our understanding of DNA repair. His achievements stand out for their great originality, breadth and lasting influence."	
2007	Cyril Hilsum	Physics	"In recognition of his many outstanding contributions and for continuing to use his prodigious talents on behalf of industry, government and academy to this day."	
2007	James Feast	Chemistry	"In recognition of his outstanding contributions to chemical synthesis with far reaching implications, particularly for the field of functional polymeric materials."	
2008	Robert Hedges	Archaeology	"In recognition of his contribution to the rapid development of accelerator mass spectrometry and radiocarbon dating techniques."	
2008	Philip Cohen	Biochemistry	"In recognition of his major contribution to our understanding of the role of protein phosphorylation in cell regulation."	
2008	Alan Fersht	Chemistry	"In recognition of his seminal work in protein engineering, which he has developed into a fundamental tool in enzyme analysis and the problem of protein folding."	
2009	Chintamani Rao	Chemistry	"For his highly innovative and diverse contributions to solid-state and materials chemistry."	
2009	Ronald Laskey	Molecular Biology	"For his pivotal contributions to our understanding of the control of DNA replication and nuclear protein transport, which has led to a novel screening method for cancer diagnosis."	
2009	Chris Dobson	Biophysics	"For his outstanding contributions to the understanding of the mechanisms of protein folding and mis-folding, and the implications for disease."	
2010	Peter Knight	Quantum optics	"for his pioneering research and international leadership in the field of quantum optics and quantum information science."	
2010	Azim Surani	Biology	"for his pivotal contributions to the understanding of early mammalian development."	
2010	Allen Hill	Chemistry	"for his pioneering work on protein electrochemistry, which revolutionised the diagnostic testing of glucose and many other bioelectrochemical assays."	
2011	Steven Ley	Chemistry	"for his pioneering research in organic chemistry and outstanding contributions to the methodology of synthesis."	
2011	Robin Holliday	Molecular Biology	"for his highly influential discoveries of the 'Holliday junction' structure in meiotic recombination and the function of DNA methylation at CG base pairs."	
2011	Gregory Winter	Biophysics	"for his pioneering work in protein engineering and therapeutic monoclonal antibodies, and his contributions as an inventor and entrepreneur."	
2012	Tom Kibble	Physics	"for his theories of symmetry-breaking in quantum field theory, with diverse applications to elementary particle masses, vortex formation in Helium 3 and structure formation in the early universe."	
2012	Kenneth Murray	Biology	"for his crucial contributions to the development of genetic engineering, to biotechnology and to the study of hepatitis viruses."	
2012	Andrew Holmes	Chemistry	"for his outstanding contributions to chemical synthesis at the interface between materials and biology and pioneering the field of organic electronic materials."	
2013	Rodney Baxter	Physics	"for his remarkable exact solutions of fundamental models in statistical mechanics."	
2013	Walter Bodmer	Genetics	"for seminal contributions to population genetics, gene mapping and understanding of familial genetic disease."	
2013	Peter Wells	Medical Physics	"for pioneering the application of the physical and engineering sciences to the development of ultrasonics as a diagnostic and surgical tool which has revolutionised clinical practice."	
2014	Terence Tao	Mathematics	"for his many deep and varied contributions to mathematics, including harmonic analysis, prime number theory, partial differential equations, combinatorics, computer science, statistics, representation theory, and much more."	
2014	Tony Hunter	Biochemistry	"for his discovery of tyrosine phosphorylation by src protein kinase that revolutionised our understanding of cellular signal transduction."	
2014	Howard Morris	Biophysics	"for his pioneering work in biomolecular mass spectrometry including strategy and instrument design and for outstanding entrepreneurship in biopharmaceutical characterisation."	
2015	Jocelyn Bell Burnell	Astronomy	"for her pivotal contribution in observing, analysing & understanding pulsars, one of the most important astronomical discoveries of the 20th century."	
2015	Elizabeth Blackburn	Biology	"for her work on the prediction and discovery of telomerase and the role of telomeres in protecting and maintaining the genome."	
2015	Christopher Llewellyn Smith	Physics	"for his major contributions to the development of the Standard Model, particularly his success in making the case for the building the LHC."	
2016	John Meurig Thomas	Chemistry	"for his pioneering work within catalytic chemistry, in particular on single-site heterogeneous catalysts, which have had a major impact on green chemistry, clean technology and sustainability."	
2016	Elizabeth Robertson	Biology	"for her innovative work within the field of mouse embryology and development, establishing the pathways involved in early body planning of the mammalian embryo."	
2016	John Goodby	Material Sciences	"for his major advances and discoveries of new forms of matter and materials, in particular the development of chiral liquid crystals."	
2017	Paul Corkum	Physics	"for his major contributions to laser physics and the development of the field of attosecond science."	
2017	Peter Raymond Grant; Rosemary Grant	Biology	"for their research on the ecology and evolution of Darwin's finches on the Galapagos, demonstrating that natural selection occurs frequently and that evolution is rapid as a result."	
2017	Melvyn Greaves	Medicine	"for his research on surface antigens of normal and leukaemic cells that defined the cellular lineage of different leukaemias and led to procedures now in routine clinical use."	
2018	Stephen Sparks	Geology	"for his contributions to our understanding of volcanoes, including evaluating their risks and mitigating their hazards."	
2018	Lewis Wolpert	Biology	"for his research on morphogenesis and pattern formation that led to the concept of positional information in embryonic development."	
2018	Shankar Balasubramanian; David Klenerman	Medicine	"for their co-development of DNA sequencing techniques transforming biology and genomic medicine."	
2019	Carol Robinson	Biology	"for her pioneering work on structural biology improving the understanding of proteins their interactions and functional regulation."	
2019	Michel Goedert	Biology	"for identifying and characterising assembled tau protein and alpha-synuclein and showing that they form the inclusions of Alzheimer's and Parkinson's diseases."	
2019	Ann Dowling	Physics	"for her leading research on the reduction of combustion, aerodynamic noise and the design of aircraft, and her distinguished services to engineering."	
2020	Herbert Huppert	Geophysics	"for his research in fluid mechanics. As an applied mathematician he has consistently developed highly original analysis of key natural and industrial processes."	
2020	Caroline Dean	Biology	"for elucidating molecular mechanisms underlying seasonal timing in plants, thus discovering fundamental processes of plant developmental timing and the epigenetic basis of vernalization."	
2020	Ian Shanks	Engineering	"for extending knowledge of liquid crystals and applying this successfully to invent novel LCDs. He developed commercial diabetes test strips, which have revolutionised the control and therefore the lives of diabetics worldwide.."	
2021	Colin Humphreys	Materials Science	"for excelling in basic and applied science, university-industry collaboration, technology development and transfer, academic leadership, promotion of public understanding of science, and advising on science to public bodies."	
2021	Dennis Lo	Biology	"for the discovery of foetal DNA in maternal plasma, developing non-invasive prenatal testing, and making foundational contributions for other types of liquid biopsies. He has made a major impact on pre-natal diagnosis.	
2021	Michael Green	String Theory	"for crucial and influential contributions to the development of string theory over a long period, including the discovery of anomaly cancellation."	
2022	Richard Ellis	Astronomy	"for motivating numerous advances in telescopes and instrumentation, and exploited these facilities to revolutionise the understanding of cosmological evolution."	
2022	Stephen C. West	Biology	"for discovering and determining the function of the key enzymes that are essential for recombination, repair and the maintenance of genomes."	
2022	Geoffrey Hinton	Computer Sciences	"for pioneering work on algorithms that learn distributed representations in artificial neural networks and their application to speech and vision, leading to a transformation of the international information technology industry."	
2023	Antony Hoare	Computer Sciences	"for groundbreaking contributions that have revolutionised the computer programming field, the development of "Hoare logic" that has paved the way for provably correct code, providing a robust framework for ensuring software reliability."	
2023	Herman Waldmann	Immunology	"for pioneering monoclonal antibodies for human therapy."	
2023	Patrick Vallance; Christopher Whitty	Pharmacology; Epidemiology	"for their pivotal role in ensuring that the UK's response to the covid-19 pandemic has benefitted from the very best science and evidence."	
2024	Tejinder Virdee	Physics	"for extraordinary leadership and profound impact on all phases of the monumental CMS experiment at the CERN Large Hadron Collider, including the crucial discovery of the Higgs boson through its decays to two photons."	
2024	Michael Stratton	Medicine	"for his foundational contributions to cancer genomics, the discovery of cancer genes and the identification of mutational signatures, which have transformed our understanding of cancer and somatic mutation."	
2024	Ravinder Maini; Marc Feldmann	Medicine	"for inventing anti-TNF therapy to treat rheumatoid arthritis, bringing their therapeutic from bench to bedside in one of the biggest success stories in modern medicine, and laying the groundwork for biologics to improve the quality of life for millions of people."	
2025	Matthew Rosseinsky	Materials Science	"for pioneering contributions to the design and discovery of materials, changing our understanding of synthesis to create function with digital tools."	
2025	Susanne von Caemmerer; Graham Farquhar	Biology	"for refining the ways we monitor and model photosynthesis in leaves from molecular to global scales."	
2025	Anthony P. Davis	Chemistry	"for inventing a glucose-binding molecule with exceptional capabilities and working towards applications via start-up companies Ziylo and Carbometrics."	
2026	Fiona Wood	Medicine	"for her pioneering work resulting in the invention of spray-on-skin, an innovation that has transformed the lives of burns patients globally."	
2026	Lewis E. Kay	Biochemistry	"for his remarkable contribution to understand and quantify protein dynamics and their relevance to protein function."	
2026	John A. Pyle	Atmosphere Research	"for his foundational and policy-relevant contributions to the understanding of stratospheric and tropospheric ozone via major advances in the numerical modelling of the atmosphere, his insightful interpretation of atmospheric measurements and his leadership of major field campaigns."	
