= Walter Thomas James Morgan =

British biochemist

- Born: 5 October 1900; Ilford, Essex, England, United Kingdom
- Died: 10 February 2003 (aged 102)
- Education: University of London; Queen Mary University of London (BSc); University of East London (MSc); The Lister Institute for Preventive Medicine (PhD)
- Awards: Royal Medal (1968); Paul Ehrlich and Ludwig Darmstaedter Prize (1968)
- Scientific career
- Fields: Biochemistry
- Workplaces: The Lister Institute for Preventive Medicine; Swiss Federal Institute of Technology Zürich; University of London

Walter Thomas James Morgan CBE FRS (5 October 1900 – 10 February 2003) was a British biochemist noted for his work on the immunochemistry of antigens and described as 'one of the pioneers of immunochemistry'.

== Early life ==
He was born in Ilford to Walter Morgan, a solicitor's clerk at the Royal Courts of Justice and his wife Anne. He was barred from attending primary school for a year after a ringworm infection on his head; the treatment, irradiation, caused hair to fall out, and his parents refused to sign the waiver absolving the health authority from responsibility should the hair not grow back. Due to this the family moved house to Little Ilford, where after leaving the local primary school he attended Raine's Foundation School, where he became interested in mechanical engineering. His growing interest in chemistry led him to start his own laboratory in a garden shed using chemicals bought from a supplier in London, with his main area of focus being the creation of "dyes and explosive compounds". The start of World War I in 1914 led to a drop in teaching standards as the teachers were drafted into the armed forces, and as a result he left school in 1916 to work for the Gas Light and Coke Company, which he left to work at a government-operated factory in Greenwich as he found the atmosphere at the GLCC unpleasant.

Aware that he would be drafted into the military on his 18th birthday, Morgan instead joined early so that he could pick which branch to serve in. He picked the Royal Navy, and due to his experience working with chemicals he was appointed to HMS President, producing chemicals and equipment for the navy, including smoke screen floats.

== Academia ==
He was demobilised in 1919 and offered a government grant to study at university, but his demobilisation came too late in the year for him to start his chemistry degree then. Instead he began his studies in 1920 at East London College. The degree examinations at the time were held after the summer holiday rather than before, so to help with his family's dire financial situation (his father had died in 1918, leaving his mother financially destitute) he again worked for the Gas Light and Coke Company as a junior chemist, where he was tasked with finding a better way to extract natural gas from coke than the process used at the time. He demonstrated the process at the Cantor Lecture of the Royal Society of Arts, and after an uninspiring start (the control sample initially worked just as well as the one using his process) his work turned out to be a success.

After the discovery of Insulin in 1922 Morgan became interested in medicinal chemistry, and he applied to West Ham Municipal College, where he studied for his Master of Science part-time while still working for the Gas Light and Coke Company. He finished his degree in 1925, and published his first paper in the Journal of the Chemical Society in 1926. One of his tutors while he was studying for his MSc was Arthur Harden, who impressed with his work advised Morgan to apply to The Lister Institute for Preventive Medicine for a Grocer's Company Research Student grant. He applied even though the pay (£250 a year) was less than that he was getting as a junior chemist, and was accepted by Charles Martin, the Institute director at the time. Morgan remained working there for over 50 years. Before taking up his position he did a variety of evening classes, including courses at the Case Technical Institute on the subjects of physiology and yeast microbiology and a course on biochemistry at Chelsea Polytechnic. While attending lectures at University College London he met Glen Anrep, who he worked for as an unpaid volunteer, thus getting the physiology qualification he needed to apply for a PhD.

== Work at the Lister Institute ==
He initially worked with Dr Robert Robison identifying the structure of fructose 1,6-bisphosphatase discovered by Arthur Harden and William John Young. He succeeded in doing this, and studies on esters made up a large chunk of his PhD thesis. In 1925 he attended a course on organic microanalysis at the University of Graz on the recommendation of Harden. He was awarded his PhD in 1927 and the Beit Memorial Research Fellowship, which allowed him to continue his research on sugars. He visited Graz repeatedly in later years, and saw its transformation from the relative happiness of the 1920s to the oppressive regime in the 1930s, at one point being questioned by a Nazi patrol.

In 1928 he was appointed as a biochemist at the institute's Serum and Vaccine Department north of London, where in 1930 he successfully immunised a horse against Poliomyelitis. He attended the 1929 International Physiological Congress in Boston where he met several distinguished scientists including Walter Goebel and Michael Heidelberger, both of whom became close friends. In 1936 he was awarded the Rockefeller Foundation Fellowship, allowing him to study at the Swiss Federal Institute of Technology Zürich under Tadeus Reichstein, who he also became friends with. He returned to England in 1938 to take up a position as Reader of Biochemistry at the Lister Institute, continuing to work on bacterial antigens before the outbreak of World War II forced him to stop his research due to the perceived risk of large bacterial cultures possibly being exposed to the atmosphere by bombing. Expecting casualties in the war he instead focused his attention on the structure of blood antigens with Winifred Watkins, and was one of the first to insist on human-only individual samples, rather than pooled or animal samples. It took until 1965 before they worked out the complete chemical structure of A and B-type blood.

He retired from the Biochemistry department in 1968, staying as a guest researcher until 1972 when due to the poor state of the Institute he was asked to become the director again, which he did until 1975 when the institute was forced to close. From then until 1989 he worked in an honorary position at the MRC Clinical Research Centre.

== Awards ==
He was made a Fellow of the Royal Society in 1949, and from 1956 to 1960 he served as a member of the Scientific Advisory Council. He also served on the Royal Society Council until 1958, and was elected its vice president in 1961, a position he held until 1964. In 1959 he was made a CBE and delivered the Royal Society's Croonian Lecture. In 1968 he was awarded the Royal Medal of the Royal Society 'In recognition of his outstanding contributions to knowledge of the chemistry of blood-group substances, with special reference to genetical as well as immunological considerations'.

== Personal life ==
He married Dorothy Irene Price (died 1993) on 25 April 1930, with whom he had two daughters and a son.
