= Grazia Toderi =

Italian artist

- Born: 1963 (age 62–63); Padua, Italy
- Education: Academy of Fine Arts, Bologna, Italy
- Known for: video art, installation art, photography, light as subject, mixed media
- Notable work: Red Babel/Rosso Babele (2006), Red Orbits/Orbite Rosse (2009)
- Website: graziatoderi.com/index.htm

Grazia Toderi is an Italian artist working primarily in the medium of video art. Born in Padua, and trained in painting at the Academy of Fine Arts, Bologna, Toderi began working in the medium of media and video art in the 1990s. Currently working out of Milan and Turin, the MIT Museum describes her as "one of the most recognized visual artists working in Italy today". Toderi is inspired in part by Giotto and other early 14th-century painters, but "draws more heavily on contemporary experience, from distant views of cities glowing at night to the zero-gravity ballets of the U.S. space programs". Latvia's NOASS has described Toderi as first gaining critical attention in 1993 after participating in the 45th Venice Biennale, and "often referred to as one of the most important contemporary artists, working in fields of video projection and installation art and is recognized for her iconic use of aerial images of nighttime metropolitan cities." Much of Toderi's video art involves visualizations of the infinite, and Toderi credits this to a "formative moment in her childhood—watching the simulcast of the first moonwalk."

== Video art ==
Toderi's video diptych Red Babel/Rosso Babele (2006) was created for the Venice Biennale and has been exhibited at the Pavilion of Contemporary Art, Milan (2006); the Museum of Contemporary of Art, Tokyo (2008); the Serralves Foundation, Porto (2011); the Hirshhorn Museum, Washington (2011); and the Kurtz Gallery for Photography of the MIT Museum (2017). It is currently on permanent view in the Museum of Modern and Contemporary Art in Rovereto, Italy. Red Babel/Rosso Babele is a "two channel colour video projection with audio track," or "composed of two contiguous ovals that mimic human binocular vision and are also an homage to the planisphere, an ancient tradition of terrestrial and celestial mapping." The video diptych is 58min 43sec long.

Black Scala/Scala Nera (2006)

Red Orbits/Orbite Rosse (2009) "deploys a shade of red that is familiar to urban dwellers as the peculiar coloration that derives from city lights mingling with vapors in the atmosphere" and, alongside Red Babel/Rosso Babele (2006), was a part of Toderi's 2011 U.S. museum debut at the Smithsonian Museum's Hirshhorn Museum and Sculpture Garden.

Red Atlas/Atlante Rosso (2011)

Light for K 222/Luci per K 222 (2014)

== Photography ==
Toderi is also a photographer. A number of Toderi's photographic works have been sold by Christie's, New York City, including the first of a series of five works of cibachrome mounted on plexiglas (created in 2001) Her photography will also feature in the June 23 – August 13, 2017 exhibition Sites of Assembly at the Morris and Helen Belkin Art Gallery, Vancouver, British Columbia, where her work is a part of their permanent collection.

== Select solo exhibitions ==
From April 21 – October 23, 2011, Toderi's work was the subject of the solo exhibition Directions: Grazia Toderi at the Hirshhorn Museum and Sculpture Garden of the Smithsonian Museum. The video projections featured are Red Orbits/Orbite Rosse (2009) and Red Babel/Rossa Babele (2007), which are likened to "frescoes of light" by the artist, who visualizes the infinite by way of computer animation, satellite and military footage, and her own films and photographs. Directions: Grazia Toderi was curated by associate curator, Kelly Gordon, and was Toderi's U.S. museum debut.

From October 31 – March 10, 2012, Toderi had a solo show, Grazia Toderi. Mirabilia Urbis, at MAXXI. She created a new version of Mirabilia Urbis (2012) specifically for this show. Mirabilia Urbis (2012) was shown alongside Mirabilia Urbis (2001) and Rosso (2007).

The Perth International Arts Festival invited Toderi to present, in 2013, a solo exhibition at the John Curtin Gallery in Perth. The exhibition, titled Grazia Toderi, ran from February 5 – April 14, 2013, and was supported by Visual Arts Program Partner, Wesfarmers Arts.

== Select group exhibitions ==
From September 2016 – March 2017, Toderi's video diptych Red Babel (2006) was shown alongside architect Désiré Despradelle's drawings for Beacon of Progress (1893–1900) in the Kurtz Gallery for Photography, MIT Museum's Grazia Toderi and Désiré Despradelle: Spectacular Cities. Red Babel/Rosso Babele is a utopian vision and "anamorphic projection that is [Toderi's] interpretation of the Tower of Babel myth" and, like Despradelle's drawings, it presents a "conception of the city and urban architecture as spectacle." Grazia Toderi and Désiré Despradelle: Spectacular Cities was curated by Gary Van Zante, with the assistance of Jonathan Duval, and organized by the MIT Museum.

From November 4, 2016, to March 29, 2017, and April 2 – July 2, 2017, Toderi featured alongside Orhan Pamuk in Words and Stars (2013–2016), a project that began in 2013 when Pamuk invited Toderi, whose work he admired, to design a work for the Museum of Innocence in Istanbul. Words and Stars opened at the Palazzo Madama, Piazza Castello, Turin on November 4, 2016, and on April 2, 2017, at the MART (Museo di Arte Moderna e Contemporanea di Trento e Rovereto). Pamuk and Toderi's collaborative project explores "the inclination of man to explore space and innate vocation to question the stars" and "takes shape in a trilogy divided into a monologue, dialogue and conversation on the stars: three large installations immersive multi-screen consisting of eight video projections, which combine images and text. The vocation cosmological inherent to the project thus finds expression in a unique visual and literary body." The show was curated by Gianfranco Maraniello. Words and Stars was also shown at Infini-to, the Planetarium of Turin (Infini.to – Planetario di Torino, Museo dell'Astronomia e dello Spazio) by invitation. For two days, from November 5–6, 2016, Toderi and Pamuk's work—specially created to be compatible with the planetarium dome—was projected at the planetarium.

== Writing ==
Toderi has written, entirely in Italian, for exhibitions catalogues such as "In the beginning there was the journey" for the 28th Pontevedra Biennale. Other writings are listed by the Grazia Toderi Archives of the Castle of Rivoli's contemporary art museum—the Castello di Rivoli – Museo d'Arte Contemporanea—of Rivoli-Torino, which houses the contemporary art of Turin and its related materials. The list is reproduced on the artist's website, and includes writings from 1993 to 2008, with the most recent being Toderi's Fontana, luce, colore, published in Milan in 2008.

== Permanent collections ==
Toderi's works can be found in the permanent collections of the Castle of Rivoli's Castello di Rivoli – Museo d'Arte Contemporanea, Rome's MAXXI, and the Morris and Helen Belkin Art Gallery. Works in the Castle of Rivoli's permanent collection are Il Decollo (The Take-Off) 1998, L'atrio (The Atrium) 1998, Spettatori (Audience) 2000, and Subway Series 2001. Mirabilia Urbis (2001) joined the MAXXI Arte permanent collection the year of her solo exhibition at the MAXXI (2012–2013) thanks to a donation by Renata Novarese. The Morris and Helen Belkin Art Gallery's permanent collection houses Random (2001).

== Awards and recognition ==
In 1999, Toderi was one of those awarded Italy’s Golden Lion at the Venice Biennale.

== Further watching/listening ==
As a part of the 2013 Perth International Arts Festival, Grazia Toderi spoke to Curtin University about her first Australian solo exhibition at the John Curtin Gallery (February 5 – April 14, 2013). Her work has been described by the John Curtin Gallery as containing "intriguing reference to physics – from optics to cosmology," and embedded with "highly charged sonic atmospheres," seamlessly "combined to suspend you between the wonder of luminous nightscapes and star-filled vistas with a disarming sense of surveillance and awe." Toderi and her solo exhibition were also featured on Perth Festival TV.
