= Ludwig Darmstaedter =

German chemist and historian of science (1846–1927)

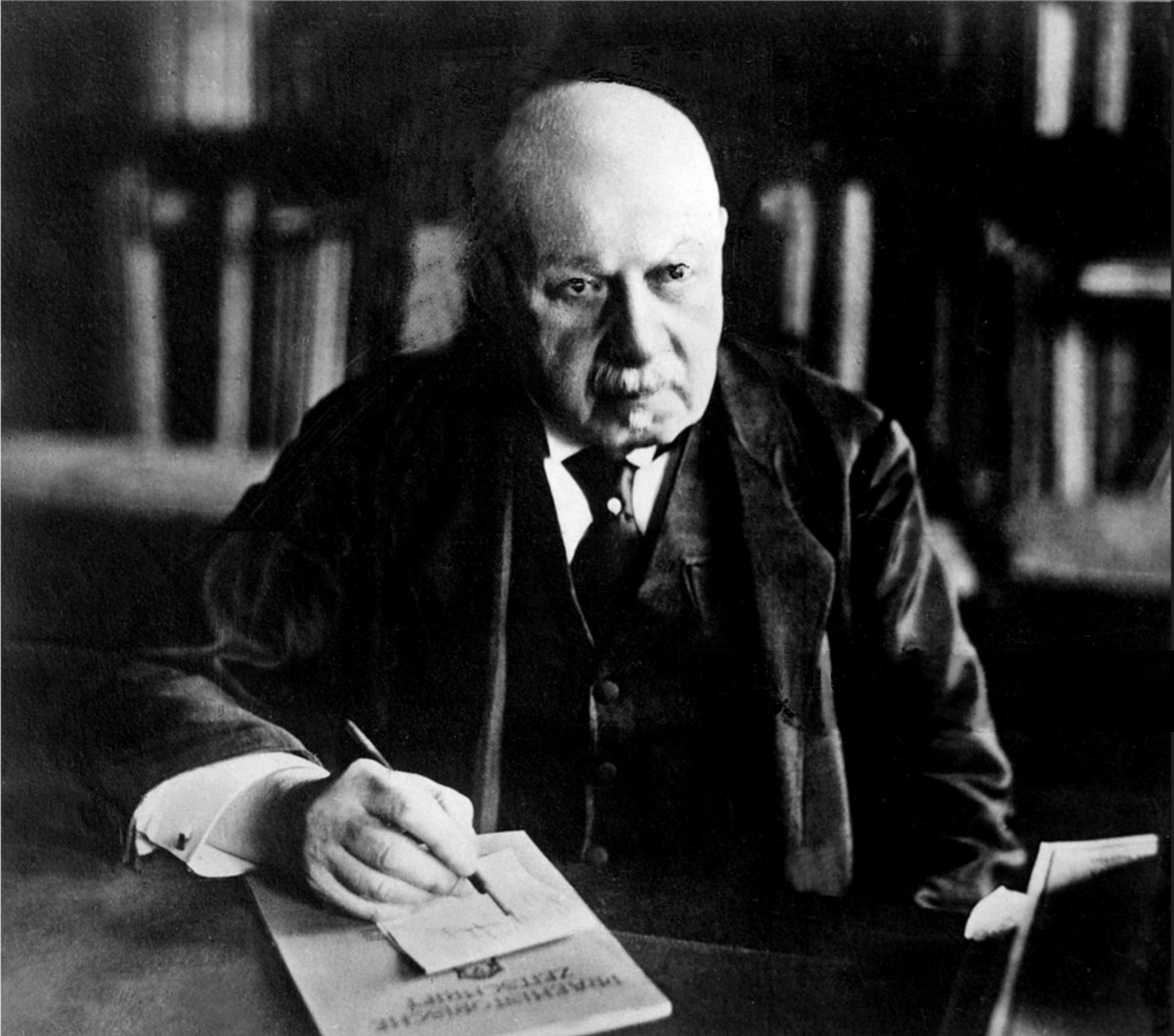
- Born: 9 August 1846; Mannheim
- Died: 18 October 1927 (aged 81); Berlin

Ludwig Darmstaedter (9 August 1846 – 18 October 1927) was a German chemist and historian of science.

From 1865 he studied chemistry under Robert Bunsen and Emil Erlenmeyer at the University of Heidelberg, then furthered his education in Leipzig as a student of Hermann Kolbe. Afterwards, he relocated to Berlin, where he performed studies on alkali fusion of sulfonic acids in the laboratory of Karl Hermann Wichelhaus. From 1872, with Benno Jaffé, he was involved with industrial chemical research; e.g. glycerin extraction. Later on in his career, he conducted investigations on the composition and synthesis of lanolin.

His interest in the historical development of chemistry inspired him to compile an extensive collection of manuscripts of scientists ("Dokumentensammlung Darmstaedter") in the Prussian State Library at Berlin. From 1917 onwards, Darmstaedter financed Wilhelm Doegen's efforts to record speech samples of persons of public interest. Since 1952 the Paul Ehrlich and Ludwig Darmstaedter Prize has been awarded in Germany for outstanding contributions in the field of medicine.

== Works ==
- Ludwig Darmstaedter, René du Bois-Reymond: 4000 jahre pionier-arbeit in den exakten wissenschaften, 1904.
- Ludwig Darmstaedter: Handbuch zur Geschichte der Naturwissenschaften und der Technik. Berlin 1908 (2nd edition).
- Ludwig Darmstaedter: Königliche Bibliothek zu Berlin. Verzeichnis der Autographensammlung. Berlin 1909.
- Ludwig Darmstaedter: Naturforscher und Erfinder. Biographische Miniaturen. Bielefeld 1926.
