= Cesare Montecucco =

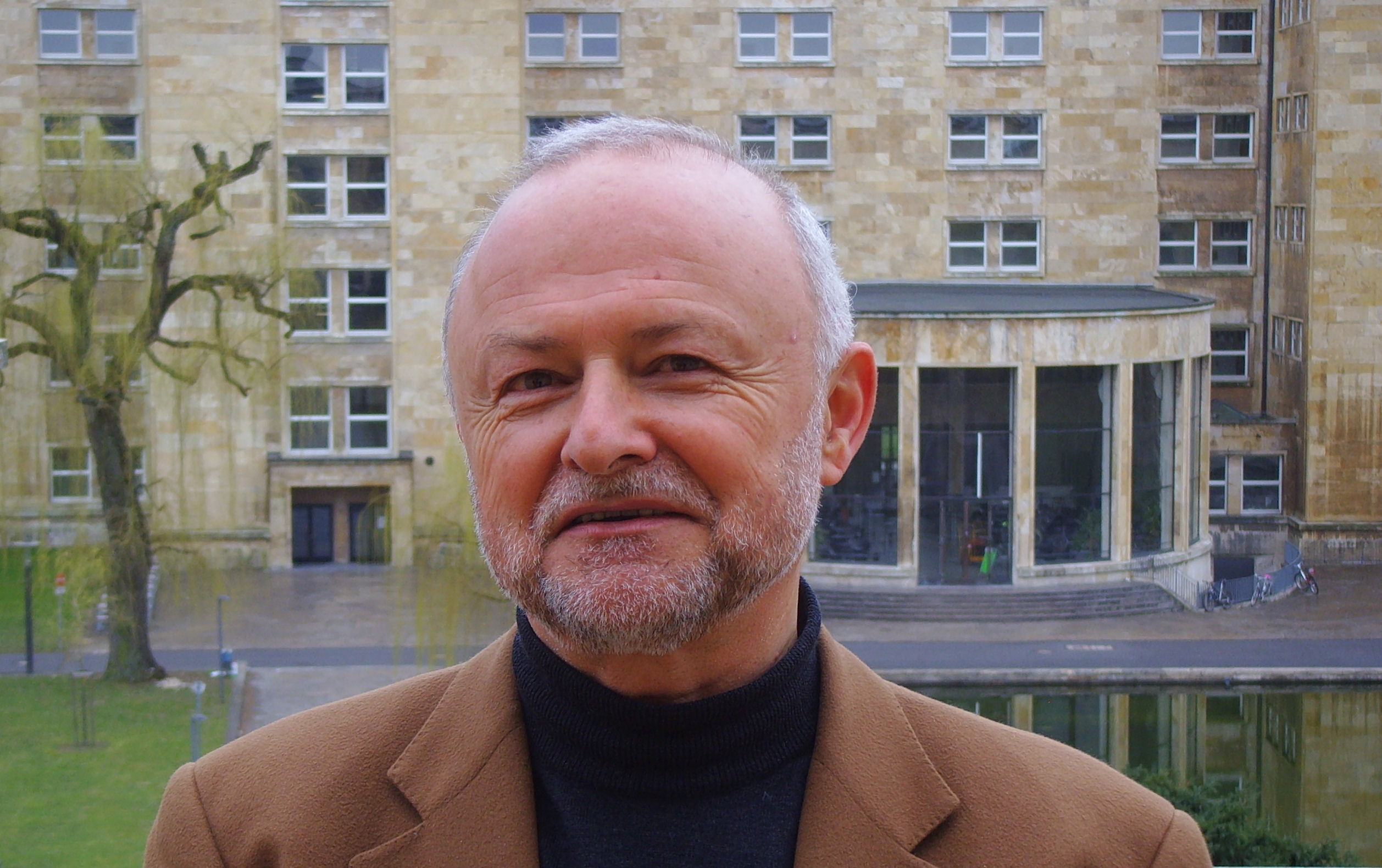
Cesare Montecucco in Frankfurt in 2011, at the ceremony for the Paul Ehrlich and Ludwig Darmstaedter Prize.

Cesare Montecucco (born 1 November 1947, in Trento) is an Italian pathologist and full professor at University of Padua, Italy. He was awarded the Paul Ehrlich and Ludwig Darmstaedter Prize in 2011 for his research on tetanus, botulism, anthrax and Helicobacter pylori-related diseases.

Throughout his career, he was the recipient of many international awards in recognition for his research accomplishments in the fields of pathology, toxicology and immunology.

== Bibliography ==
- Montecucco, Cesare (1995). Clostridial Neurotoxins. The Molecular Pathogenesis of Tetanus and Botulism. Berlin: Springer. ISBN 9783540584520.
- Rappuoli, Rino; Montecucco, Cesare (1997). Guidebook to Protein Toxins and their Use in Cell Biology. Oxford: Sambrook and Tooze Publications. ISBN 0198599544.
