= Paul Ehrlich and Ludwig Darmstaedter Prize =

Medicine award

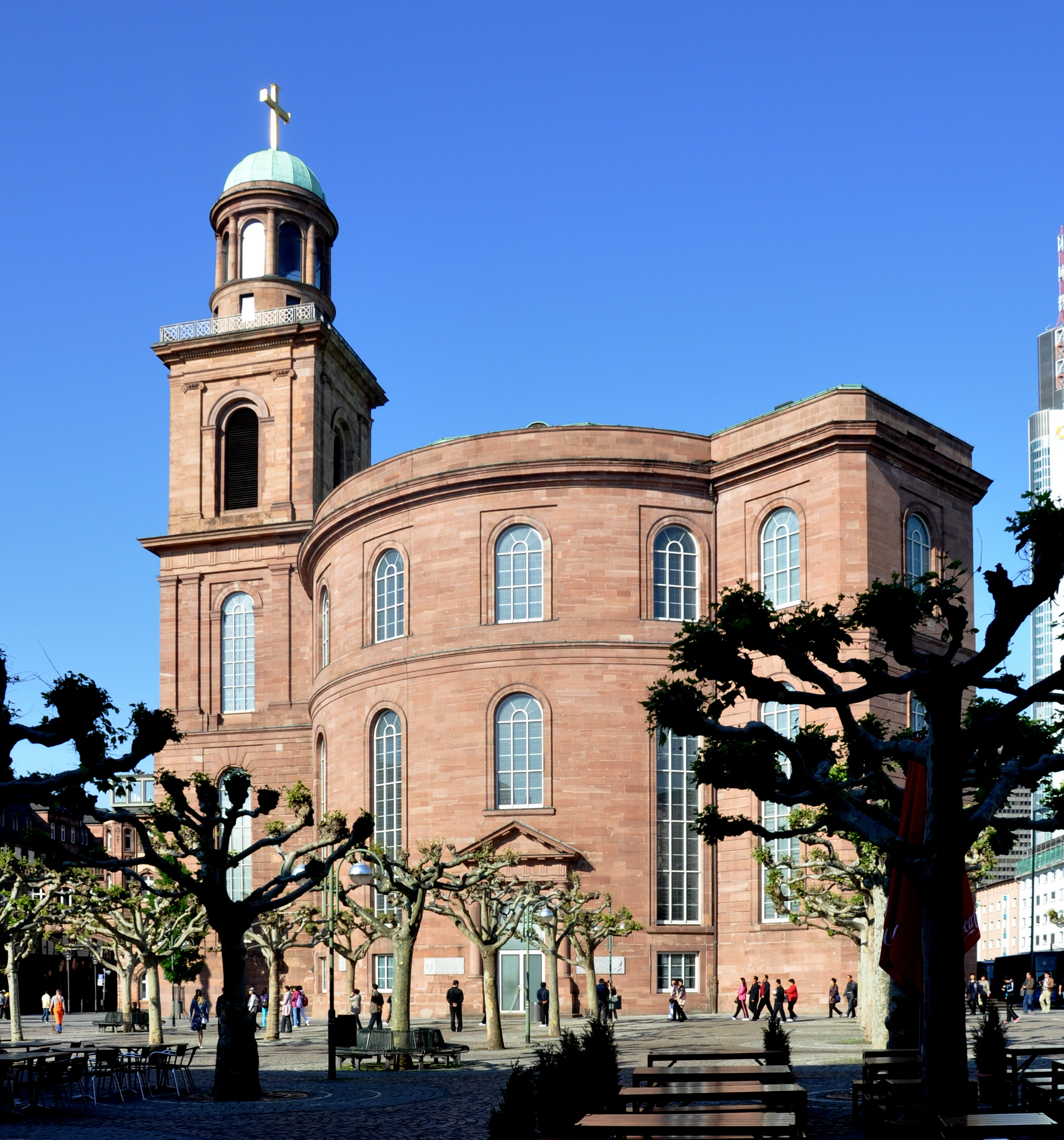
Paulskirche, Frankfurt, location of prize ceremony

The Paul Ehrlich and Ludwig Darmstaedter Prize is an annual award bestowed by the Paul Ehrlich Foundation since 1952 for research in medicine. It carries a monetary prize of 120,000 Euro. The prize ceremony is traditionally held on 14 March, the birthday of Nobel laureate Paul Ehrlich, in St. Paul's Church, Frankfurt am Main. The other namesake is Ludwig Darmstaedter.

Researchers from countries worldwide are awarded in the following fields of medicine: Immunology, Cancer research, Haematology, Microbiology and experimental and clinical Chemotherapy.

The prize is one of the highest endowed and internationally distinguished awards in medicine that is based in Germany.

== List of winners ==
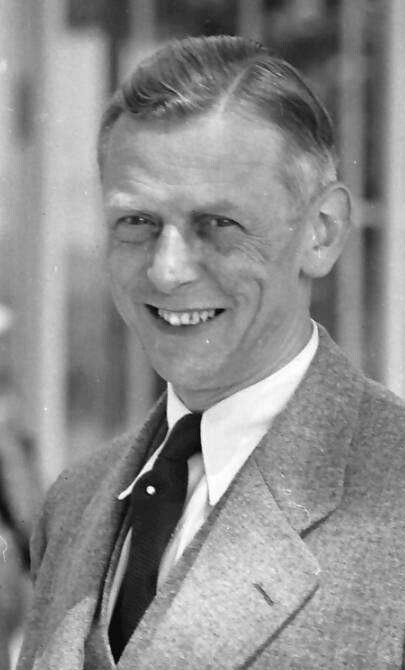
Adolf Butenandt portrait, recipient 1953

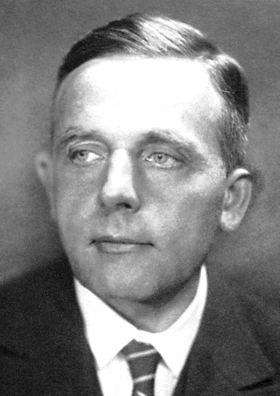
Otto Warburg, recipient 1963

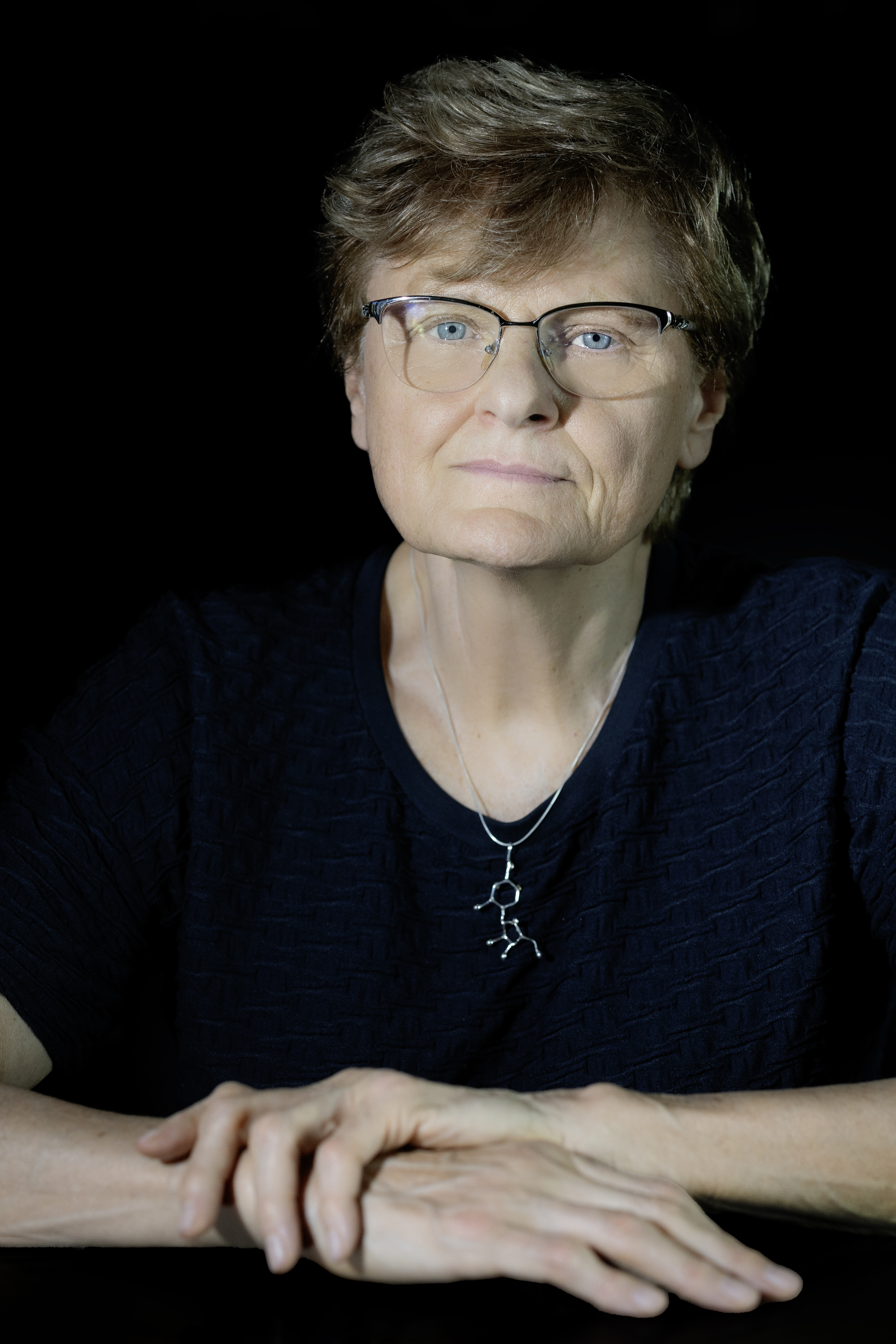
Katalin Karikó by Christopher Michel 2024, recipient 2022

Some of the Paul Ehrlich and Ludwig Darmstaedter Prize winners have also been awarded the Nobel Prize. ( indicates Nobel Prize recipients):

- 1952
  - Gerhard Eissner, Tübingen
  - Wolf-Helmut Wagner, Nonnenhorn
- 1953
  - Adolf Butenandt, Munich ( 1939)
- 1954
  - Ernst Boris Chain, London ( 1945)
- 1956
  - Gerhard Domagk, Elberfeld ( 1939)
- 1958
  - Richard Johann Kuhn, Heidelberg ( 1938)
- 1960
  - Felix Haurowitz, Bloomington
- 1961
  - Albert Hewett Coons, Boston
  - Günther Heymann, Langen
  - Örjan Ouchterlony, Gothenburg
  - Jacques Oudin, Paris
- 1962
  - Otto Heinrich Warburg, Berlin ( 1931)
- 1963
  - Helmut Holzer, Freiburg im Breisgau
  - Lothar Jaenicke, Cologne
  - Detlev Kayser, Berlin
  - Tullio Terranova, Rome
- 1964
  - Fritz Kauffmann, Copenhagen
- 1965
  - Otto Lüderitz, Freiburg im Breisgau
  - Léon Le Minor, Paris
  - Ida Ørskov, Copenhagen
  - Frits Ørskov, Copenhagen
  - Bruce Stocker, Stanford
- 1966
  - Francis Peyton Rous, New York ( 1966)
- 1967
  - Wilhelm Bernhard, Villejuif
  - Renato Dulbecco, San Diego ( 1975)
- 1968
  - Walter Thomas James Morgan, London
  - Otto Westphal, Montreux
- 1969
  - Hiroshi Nikaido, Boston
  - Anne-Marie Staub, Paris
  - Winifred M. Watkins, London
- 1970
  - Ernst Ruska, Berlin ( 1986)
  - Helmut Ruska, Düsseldorf
- 1971
  - Albert Claude, Brussels
  - Keith R. Porter, Boulder
  - Fritiof S. Sjöstrand, Los Angeles
- 1972
  - Denis Parsons Burkitt, London / Uganda
  - Jan Waldenström, Malmö
- 1973
  - Michael Anthony Epstein, Bristol
  - Kimishige Ishizaka, Baltimore
  - Dennis H. Wright, Southampton
- 1974
  - James L. Gowans, Oxford
  - Jacques Miller, Melbourne
- 1975
  - George Bellamy Mackaness, Saranac Lake
  - Avrion Mitchison, London
  - Morten Simonsen, Copenhagen
- 1976
  - Georges Barski, Villejuif
  - Boris Ephrussi, Gif-sur-Yvette
- 1977
  - Torbjörn Caspersson, Stockholm
  - John B. Gurdon, Cambridge
- 1978
  - Ludwik Gross, New York
  - Werner Schäfer, Tübingen
- 1979
  - Arnold Graffi, Berlin
  - Otto Mühlbock, Amsterdam
  - Wallace P. Rowe, Bethesda
- 1980
  - Akiba Tomoichirō, Saitama
  - Hamao Umezawa, Tokyo
- 1981
  - Stanley Falkow, Seattle
  - Susumu Mitsuhashi, Maebashi
- 1982
  - Niels Kaj Jerne, Castillon-du-Gard ( 1986)
- 1983
  - Peter C. Doherty, Canberra ( 1996)
  - Michael Potter, Bethesda
  - Rolf Zinkernagel, Zürich ( 1996)
- 1984
  - Piet Borst, Amsterdam
  - George A. M. Cross, New York
- 1985
  - Ernest Bueding, Baltimore
  - Louis H. Miller, Bethesda
  - Ruth Sonntag Nussenzweig, New York University
- 1986
  - Abner L. Notkins, Bethesda
- 1987
  - Jean-François Borel, Basel
  - Hugh O'Neill McDevitt, Stanford
  - Felix Milgrom, Buffalo
- 1988
  - Peter K. Vogt, Los Angeles
- 1989
  - Stuart A. Aaronson, Bethesda
  - Russell F. Doolittle, University of California, San Diego
  - Thomas Graf, Heidelberg
- 1990
  - R. John Collier, Boston
  - Alwin Max Pappenheimer, Jr., Cambridge, Massachusetts
- 1991
  - Rino Rappuoli, Siena
  - Michio Ui, Tokyo
- 1992
  - Manfred Eigen, Göttingen ( 1967)
- 1993
  - Philippa Marrack, Denver
  - John W. Kappler, Denver
  - Harald von Boehmer, Basel
- 1994
  - Peter M. Howley, Boston
  - Harald zur Hausen, Heidelberg ( 2008)
- 1995
  - Stanley Prusiner, San Francisco ( 1997)
- 1996
  - Pamela J. Bjorkman, Pasadena
  - Hans-Georg Rammensee, Heidelberg
  - Jack L. Strominger, Cambridge, Massachusetts
- 1997
  - Barry Marshall, Perth, Western Australia ( 2005)
  - John Robin Warren, Perth, Western Australia ( 2005)
- 1998
  - David P. Lane, Dundee
  - Arnold J. Levine, Princeton University
  - Bert Vogelstein, Baltimore
- 1999
  - Robert Charles Gallo, Baltimore
- 2000
  - H. Robert Horvitz, Cambridge, Massachusetts ( 2002)
  - John F. R. Kerr, Brisbane
- 2001
  - Stephen C. Harrison, Cambridge, Massachusetts
  - Michael G. Rossmann, West Lafayette
- 2002
  - Craig Venter, Rockville
- 2003
  - Richard A. Lerner, La Jolla
  - Peter G. Schultz, La Jolla
- 2004
  - Tak Wah Mak, University of Toronto
  - Mark M. Davis, Stanford University
- 2005
  - Ian Wilmut, Roslin Institute, Edinburgh
- 2006
  - Craig Mello, Howard Hughes Medical Institute and Massachusetts Medical School in Worcester, Massachusetts ( 2006)
  - Andrew Z. Fire, Stanford University ( 2006)
- 2007
  - Ada Yonath, Biochemist, Weizmann Institute, Rehovot, Israel ( 2009)
  - Harry Noller, University of California, Santa Cruz, USA
- 2008
  - Tim Mosmann, University of Rochester
- 2009
  - Elizabeth Blackburn, University of California, San Francisco ( 2009)
  - Carol W. Greider, Johns Hopkins University, Baltimore ( 2009)
- 2010
  - Charles Dinarello, University of Colorado Denver
- 2011
  - Cesare Montecucco, University of Padua
- 2012
  - Peter Walter, University of California, San Francisco
- 2013
  - Mary-Claire King, University of Washington, Seattle
- 2014
  - Michael Reth, University of Freiburg
- 2015
  - James P. Allison, University of Texas, Houston ( 2018)
  - Carl H. June, Perelman School of Medicine at the University of Pennsylvania
- 2016
  - Emmanuelle Charpentier, Max Planck Institute for Infection Biology, Berlin, and Umeå University ( 2020)
  - Jennifer Doudna, University of California, Berkeley ( 2020)
- 2017
  - Yuan Chang, University of Pittsburgh Cancer Institute
  - Patrick S. Moore, University of Pittsburgh Cancer Institute
- 2018
  - Anthony Cerami, Araim Pharmaceuticals, Tarrytown, New York State
  - David Wallach, The Weizmann Institute of Science in Rehovot
- 2019
  - Franz-Ulrich Hartl, Max Planck Institute, Munich
  - Arthur L. Horwich, Yale School of Medicine
- 2020
  - Shimon Sakaguchi, Osaka University, Japan ( 2025)
- 2021
  - Michael R. Silverman, Emeritus Agouron Institute in La Jolla
  - Bonnie Bassler, Princeton University and Howard Hughes Medical Institute
- 2022
  - Katalin Karikó, University of Pennsylvania ( 2023)
  - Özlem Türeci, BioNTech in Mainz (Germany)
  - Uğur Şahin, BioNTech in Mainz (Germany)
- 2023
  - Frederick W. Alt, Harvard Medical School
  - David G. Schatz, Yale Medical School
- 2024
  - Dennis Kasper, Harvard Medical School
- 2025
  - Andrea Ablasser, École polytechnique fédérale de Lausanne
  - Glen Barber, Ohio State University
  - Zhijian "James" Chen, University of Texas Southwestern Medical Center
- 2026
  - Davor Solter, Max Planck Institute, Freiburg, Germany
  - Azim Surani, University of Cambridge, UK
- 2027
  - Christopher Goodnow, University of New South Wales, Sydney, Australia

== See also ==
- List of medicine awards
