= Harry F. Noller =

American biochemist (born 1939)

- Born: June 10, 1939 (age 87); Oakland, California
- Education: University of California, Berkeley, University of Oregon
- Known for: Ribosome structural and functional determination
- Awards: Paul Ehrlich and Ludwig Darmstaedter Prize (2006); Gairdner Foundation International Award (2007); Breakthrough Prize (2016)
- Scientific career
- Fields: Biochemistry
- Workplaces: University of California, Santa Cruz

Harry Francis Noller Jr. (born June 10, 1939) is an American biochemist, and since 1992 the director of the University of California, Santa Cruz's Center for the Molecular Biology of RNA. He has made significant contributions to our understanding of the ribosome and is a member of the National Academy of Sciences.

== Early life and education ==
Noller is a native of Oakland, California. He earned his B.S. degree in biochemistry at the University of California, Berkeley in 1960 and his Ph.D. in chemistry from the University of Oregon in 1965.He carried out post-doctoral work at the Medical Research Council Laboratory of Molecular Biology in Cambridge and the Institute of Molecular Biology at the University of Geneva.

== Scientific contributions and honors ==
Noller joined the faculty at University of California, Santa Cruz in 1968. In his decades-long study of the molecular translational machinery of the cell, he has made fundamental contributions in understanding the structure and function of the cell's protein-synthesis factory, the ribosome. Notable amongst these contributions are having demonstrated that the ribosome is a ribozyme and leading the solution of the first crystal structures at molecular resolution for complete ribosomes.

Noller was elected to the National Academy of Sciences in 1992. He has been recognized with prizes from the Paul Ehrlich Foundation in 2006 and the Gairdner Foundation in 2007, each of which was shared with eventual winners of the Nobel Prize in Chemistry for 2009. He won a Breakthrough Prize in 2016.
