= Winifred Watkins =

British biochemist (1924–2003)

- Born: 6 August 1924; Shepherd's Bush, London, England
- Died: 3 October 2003 (aged 79)
- Employer: University of London
- Awards: Paul Ehrlich and Ludwig Darmstaedter Prize (1969); Royal Medal (1988)

Winifred May Watkins, FRS (6 August 1924 – 3 October 2003) was a British biochemist and academic. She worked at the Imperial College School of Medicine.

== Early life ==
Watkins was born on 6 August 1924 in Shepherd's Bush, London, England. Her father worked as an engraver but he was an artist in his spare time. She took to science after she won a scholarship to The Godolphin and Latymer School for Girls in Hammersmith. In 1939 the whole school was evacuated from London with no forward planning for where the school would stay. Watkins returned to London after a year.

She had intended to study medicine but the war meant that she had to work whilst studying at the Chelsea Polytechnic. She started a lifelong collaboration with Walter Morgan and she obtained special permission to be credited on a joint paper as she lacked the qualifications normally required. She eventually obtained a degree in Physics and Chemistry in 1947 from London University. After studying at St Bartholomew's Hospital Medical School she obtained a doctorate in biochemistry from the University of London in 1950.

== Academic career ==
She was working on the science of blood and blood groups and she joined a specialist group at the Lister Institute. She was made a Reader in biochemistry at the University of London in 1965, and appointed Professor in 1968.

Following her publication of an important paper that explained the biosynthesis of blood groups she was funded to work at the University of California.

== Honours ==
Awards followed for her contribution to blood transfusion and she was elected Fellow of the Royal Society (FRS) in 1969 and of the University of London in 1970.

She was awarded the Royal Medal by the Royal Society in 1988. She was a member of the Royal Swedish Academy of Sciences:

"In recognition of her fundamental contributions towards an understanding of the biochemical genetics of carbohydrate antigens on cell surfaces and in secreted glycoproteins."
