= Anne-Marie Staub =

French biochemist and chemist

- Born: 13 November 1914; Pont-Audemer, France
- Died: 30 December 2012 (aged 98); Saint-Germain-en-Laye, France
- Known for: Work on first antisthamines, studies on Salmonella

Anne-Marie Staub (13 November 1914 – 30 December 2012) was a French biochemist who spent most of her career at the Institut Pasteur. She is most known for her work in antihistamines, serology and immunology including her research on Salmonella and tyvelose.

== Biography ==
=== Early life and education ===
Anne-Marie Staub was born on 13 November 1914 in Pont-Audemer, France into a Pasteurian family: Louis Pasteur was the witness to her grandfather's wedding, and her father André Staub was a researcher in the Institut Pasteur. As a child she learned to read and write from her mother before completing her education at the Ecole Normale catholique where she obtained her baccalaureate.

She earned her degrees in general mathematics, chemistry and general physics, physiology and biochemistry from the Sorbonne. She later added to her education by attending microbiology courses at the Institut Pasteur from 1935 to 1936, before joining the institute to work on her PhD thesis.

=== Work and research ===
While conducting research at the Institut Pasteur in 1937, she worked for Daniel Bovet and her first published works led to the discovery of antihistamines. This discovery was the basis of the Nobel Prize that would be awarded to Bovet in 1957. The molecules that she developed were still too toxic to be successfully used but they are the basis for the research that followed.

In 1940 she started working on a vaccine for anthrax. From 1941 to 1946 she worked with the B. anthracis antigens and successfully injected a sheep with a vaccine for the bacteria. During this time she also taught French, German and first aid to soldiers engaged in World War II. From 1947 to 1948 she received funding from the Medical Research Council and went to works at the Lister Institute in the laboratories of Paul Fildes and Gareth Gladstone. Then, from 1955 to 1975, in collaboration with O. Lüderitz and O. Wespthal, researchers at the Max Planck Institute, she took part in research on antigens of Salmonella. It was during this time that she identified tyvelose as a component of the O-antigen of Salmonella. In 1953 she as promoted to head of laboratory in the vaccine department of the Institut Pasteur and in 1967 she became head of the Bacterial Antigen unit. She co-directed the immunology course from 1960 to 1974 and became a professor in 1970.

Throughout her career she published many articles about her research, often in collaboration with D. Bovet and O. Westphal.

=== Retirement and death ===
Anne-Marie Staub retired in 1977 and joined a Christian movement called Vie Montante. She spent most of her time reading for the blind and visiting patients in hospitals. Staub died on 30 December 2012 in Saint-Germain-en-Laye, France.

== Awards ==
- 1969 Paul Ehrlich and Ludwig Darmstaedter Prize
- 1973 Knight of the Légion d'Honeur
- 1993 Honorary member of the International Endotoxin and Innate Immunity Society
