= Museum of Modern and Contemporary Art of Trento and Rovereto =

- Museo d'Arte Moderna e Contemporanea di Trento e Rovereto
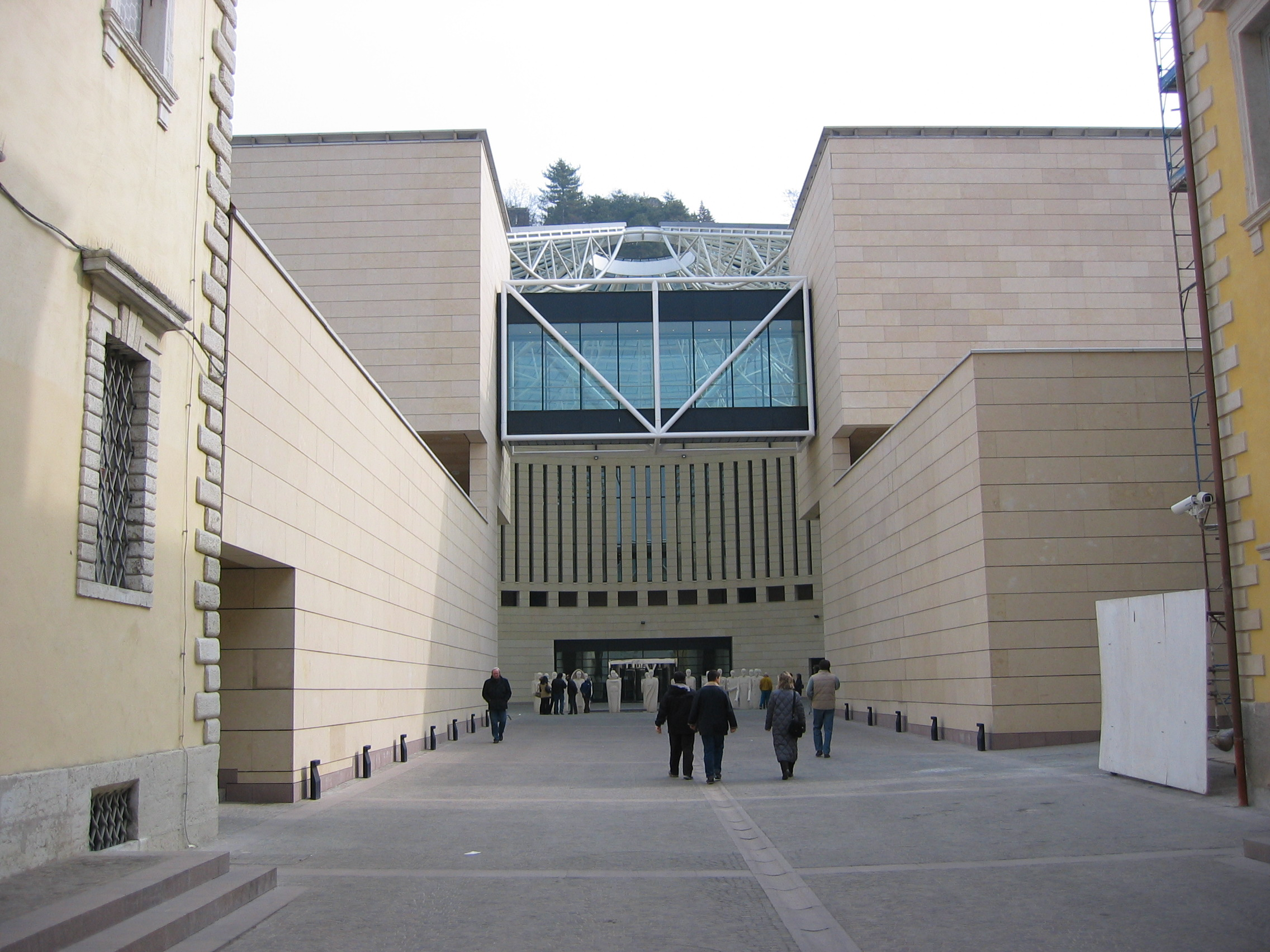
- MART, Entrance
- Location: Corso Angelo Bettini, 43, 38068 Rovereto TN, Italy
- Coordinates: 45.8940°N 11.0450°E
- Type: Art museum
- Director: Diego Ferretti
- President: Vittorio Sgarbi
- Public transit access: Rovereto train station. Taxis outside station.
- Website: www.mart.trento.it

The Museum of Modern and Contemporary Art of Trento and Rovereto (Italian: Museo d'Arte Moderna e Contemporanea di Trento e Rovereto), officially abbreviated as MART is a museum centre in the Italian province of Trento. The main site is in Rovereto, and contains mostly modern and contemporary artworks, including works from renowned Giorgio Morandi, Giorgio de Chirico, Antonio Rotta, Felice Casorati, Carlo Carrà, and Fortunato Depero. Fortunato Depero's house in Rovereto (known as Casa d'Arte Futurista Depero) is also part of the Museum.

The permanent collection contains more than 15,000 artworks, including paintings, drawings, engravings, and sculptures.

== History ==
The MART originated in 1987 as an autonomous entity within the autonomous Trentino province. It was installed in the Palazzo delle Albere in Trento. The idea of expanding the museum to combine both the legacy of the great futurist Fortunato Depero and the disparate inheritance held by the Trento Regional Arts Museum ("Museo Provinciale d'Arte di Trento") dates back to 1991, and was the project, in the first instance, of Gabriella Belli.

On 15 December 2002 the MART finally opened to the general public, with a new headquarters at Rovereto, a small town a short distance to the south of Trento.

== Design and construction ==
Design of the new building was entrusted to the Ticinese architect Mario Botta, who worked on its development with the Rovereto structural engineer Giulio Andreolli. A 29,000 square metre site was available, but between the site and the road (Via Bettini) allowance had to be made for two substantial eighteenth century town houses (palazzi). Fortunately there is a gap between the two which provides sufficient space for an entrance.

Botta's solution to the challenges of the site draws inspiration from classical forms (notably that of the Pantheon), but also incorporates technically adventurous solutions. Invoking the mantra, "Space for art, not space despite art", the design involves a "pantheon without a facade", involving three storeys of museum space arranged around a large round "agora", covered over with "glass" dome/cupola with a 40-meter diameter. The structure of the cupola makes extensive use of steel and "plexiglass", and includes a "missing slice" made possible by complex engineering solutions. in the central area beneath the cupola there is a fountain. The wall facings make use of the yellow stone from Vicenza, which was the stone favoured by Andrea Palladio, although the innovative way in which the facing slabs have been attached allows for each to be individually replaced without major structural upheavals, in a way owes little to the sixteenth century architectural maestro. The "agora" can accommodate up to 1,200 visitors.

== Exhibitions ==
Words and Stars (2 April – 2 July 2017) presented Nobel Prize winning author Pamuk and renowned contemporary artist Toderi's collaborative project exploring "the inclination of man to explore space and innate vocation to question the stars," which took "shape in a trilogy divided into a monologue, dialogue and conversation on the stars: three large installations immersive multi-screen consisting of eight video projections, which combine images and text. The vocation cosmological inherent to the project thus finds expression in a unique visual and literary body." The show was curated by Gianfranco Maraniello.

Recent exhibitions have included An Eternal Beauty. The Classical Canon in Early 20th Century Italian Art (2 July – 5 November 2017), Francesco Lo Savio (5 November 2017 – 18 March 2018), Magic Realism. Enchantment in Italian Painting in the 1920s and 1930s (3 December 2017 – 2 April 2018), Gianfranco Baruchello (18 May – 16 September 2018), and Richard Artschwager (12 October 2019 – 2 February 2020).
