= Palazzo delle Albere, Trento =

Coordinates: 46.063169°N 11.113663°E

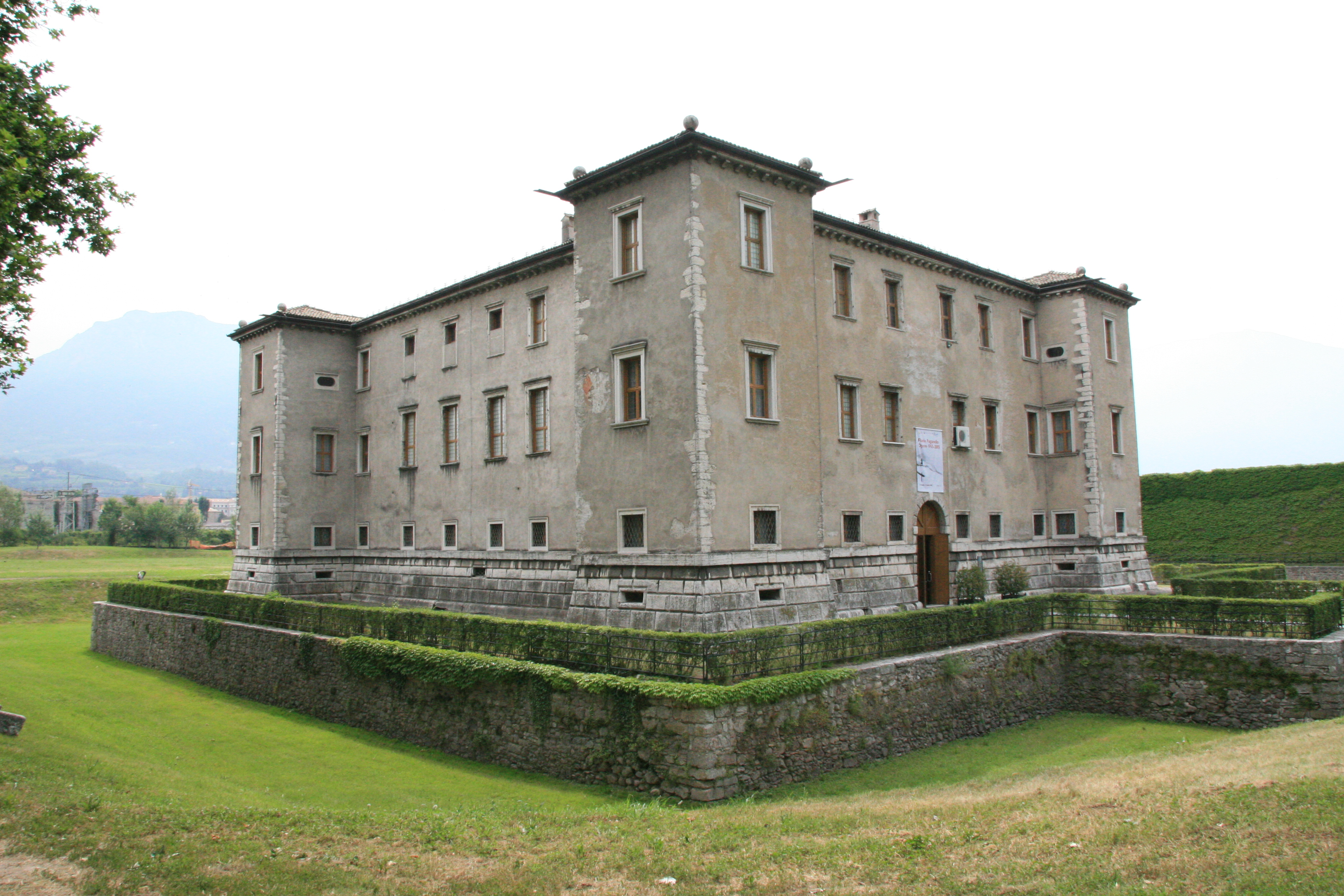
Palazzo delle Albere

Palazzo delle Albere is a Renaissance villa-fortress located in Trento, northern Italy. It was built in the 16th century by the Madruzzo family, who held the office of prince-bishops of Trento. The name, meaning Palace of the Trees, derives from the rows of poplars that once lined the approach to the castle. The building is surrounded by a park, which has been reduced in size over time due to the construction of the Brenner Railway and the partial occupation of the grounds by the Trento Monumental Cemetery.

The structure has a square plan, featuring four square corner towers—each 6 metres wide and 20 metres tall—surrounded by a moat.

The Great Hall on the second floor once contained frescoes celebrating the deeds of Emperor Charles V. Although those are no longer visible, depictions of the twelve months can still be seen. The third floor preserves numerous Renaissance frescoes, portraying imaginary landscapes with ruins and castles, along with allegorical representations of the seven Liberal arts, the four Cardinal virtues, and the three Theological virtues.

According to legend, the villa was once connected to the city's cathedral by a secret underground tunnel, allowing the prince-bishops to move between them unseen.

From 1987 to 2011, Palazzo delle Albere housed the Museum of Modern and Contemporary Art of Trento and Rovereto (MART).

== Sources ==
- Gorfer, Aldo (1992). I castelli di Trento (in Italian). Trento: Arti Grafiche Saturnia.
