= Rino Rappuoli =

Italian immunologist (born 1952)

Rino Rappuoli ForMemRS
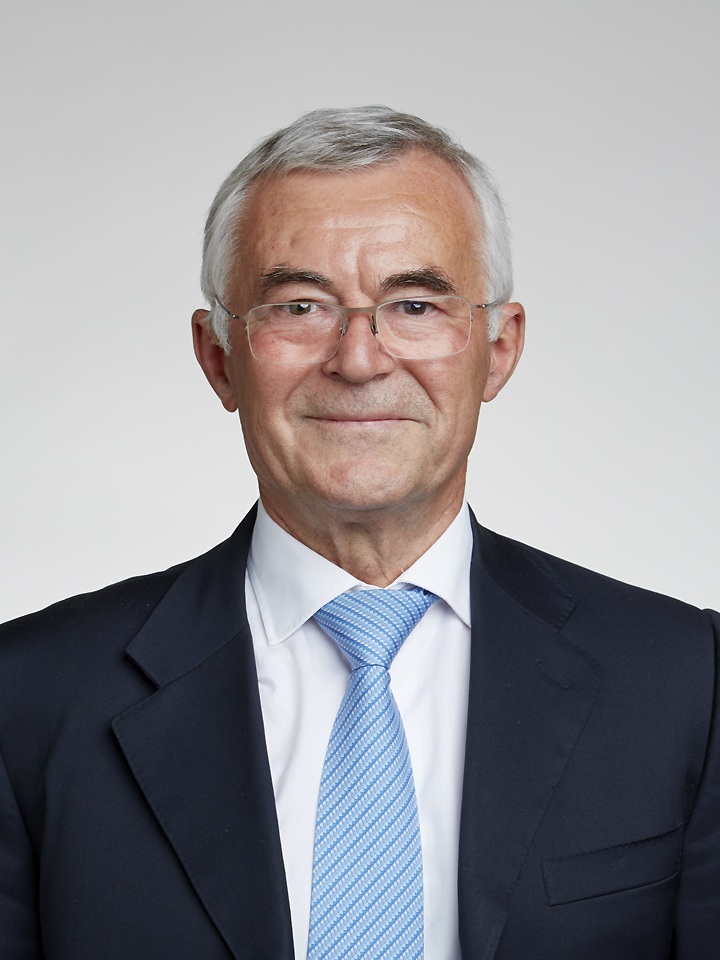
- Rappuoli in 2016
- Born: 4 August 1952 (age 73); Radicofani, Italy
- Scientific career
- Fields: Vaccines; Infectious diseases; Global health
- Website: www.aditecproject.eu/about-aditec/project-management/dr-rino-rappuoli.html

Rino Rappuoli ForMemRS (born 4 August 1952) is an Italian immunologist. He is currently the scientific director of the Fondazione Biotecnopolo di Siena. Previously, he served as chief scientist and head of external R&D at GlaxoSmithKline (GSK) Vaccines, visiting scientist at Rockefeller University and Harvard Medical School, and held senior roles at Sclavo, Chiron Corporation, and Novartis Vaccines.

== Education ==
Rappuoli earned his doctoral and bachelor's degrees in biological sciences at the University of Siena.

== Career and research ==
He is known globally for his work in vaccines and immunology. He co-founded the field of cellular microbiology, a discipline combining cell biology and microbiology, and pioneered the genomic approach to vaccine development known as reverse vaccinology, a subsection of reverse pharmacology.

Rappuoli joined Chiron as head of European vaccines research in 1992 with the acquisition of Italian vaccines company Sclavo SpA, where he served as head of research and development. He was subsequently the global head of vaccines research for Novartis Vaccines & Diagnostics (Siena, Italy). From 2015 to 2022, he served as chief scientist and head of external R&D at the vaccines division of GlaxoSmithKline, based in Siena, Italy. He is also a professor of vaccinology at the University of Siena.

Major achievements include development of CRM197 used in Haemophilus influenzae, Neisseria meningitidis, and pneumococcus vaccines; an acellular pertussis vaccine containing a genetically detoxified pertussis toxin; the first conjugate vaccines against meningococcus; MF59 adjuvant for influenza; the meningococcus B genome-derived vaccine.

During his career, he has introduced several novel scientific concepts: genetic detoxification in 1987; cellular microbiology in 1996; reverse vaccinology in 2000; pan-genome in 2005.

He has mentored a generation of vaccinologists, including Dirga Sakti Rambe and Melvin Sanicas.

=== Honors and awards ===
Rappuoli is the recipient of several prestigious awards, including the Paul Ehrlich and Ludwig Darmstaedter Prize in 1991. He is a member of numerous international associations, including the European Molecular Biology Organization and the American Society for Microbiology. He also serves as a member of the research directors group of the European Commission and in 2005 was elected to National Academy of Sciences of the United States. He was also awarded the Italian President Gold Medal in 2005 and the Albert Sabin Gold Medal in 2009. In 2013 he was nominated third most influential person worldwide in the field of vaccines by Terrapin. In 2015 he was awarded Fellowship of Imperial College London Faculty of Medicine and the Maurice Hilleman Award.

In 2016 he was elected a Foreign Member of the Royal Society.

In 2017 he received the European Inventor Award 2017 in the category of "Lifetime achievement" by the European Patent Office. In 2019 he was awarded the Robert Koch Prize.
