= Gilbert Roberts =

Gil or Gilbert Roberts may refer to:

- Gil Roberts (born 1989), American sprinter
- Gilbert Roberts (civil engineer) (1899–1978), British civil engineer
- Gilbert Roberts (Royal Navy officer) (1900–1986), British navy officer
