= Alexander Thomas Cameron =

British biochemist (1882–1947)

- Born: 1882; London, England
- Died: September 2, 1947 (aged 64–65); Winnipeg, Manitoba, Canada
- Education: University of Edinburgh
- Known for: Professor of Biochemistry at University of Manitoba; author of Textbook of Biochemistry
- Scientific career
- Fields: Biochemistry
- Workplaces: University of Manitoba

Alexander Thomas Cameron (1882 – 25 September 1947) was a British-born Canadian biochemist. He was best known as Professor of Biochemistry at the University of Manitoba, and as the author of numerous popular biochemistry textbooks, including the Textbook of Biochemistry.

== Biography ==
Alexander Thomas Cameron was born in 1882 in London, England, to Scottish parents. His early education took place in Swindon. Cameron graduated from the University of Edinburgh with a Master of Arts in 1904, and a Bachelor of Science in 1906. His first published paper appeared in Proceedings of the Royal Society of Edinburgh in 1905, and concerned the crystallisation of potassium hydrogen succinate. In 1907 he was awarded the Gunning Victoria Jubilee Prize in Chemistry

Cameron was awarded an 1851 Exhibition Scholarship in 1906, and spent the next two years studying radiochemistry at University College, London, under Sir William Ramsay. He subsequently spent a year at the Technical High School (or Polytechnic Institute) in Karlsruhe, Germany, under Fritz Haber.

In 1909, Cameron was appointed lecturer in physiology at the University of Manitoba in Winnipeg, Manitoba, Canada. Working under Professor Swale Vincent, Cameron fostered an interest in endocrinology, researching the distribution of iodine in living tissues. In 1923, the department of physiology was branched to include a separate biochemistry department, for which Cameron was appointed professor.

Apart from a summer semester spent at the University of Heidelberg, under Albrecht Kossel, and three years as captain, R.A.M.C., with the British Expeditionary Force in France during World War I, Cameron spent the remainder of his career at the University of Manitoba. His publications on the biochemistry of iodine earned him a D.Sc. from the University of Edinburgh in 1925.

In 1928, Cameron published Textbook of Biochemistry, which became a standard in its field. By 1948, the textbook had gone through six editions, in addition to one Chinese and two Spanish editions. His other widely used textbooks included Practical Biochemistry (1930, with Frank D. White), Biochemistry of Medicine (1933, with C.R. Gilmour), and Recent Advances in Endocrinology (1933).

In addition to his academic duties, Cameron also served as chairman of the Fisheries Research Board of Canada from 1934 to 1947, a role for which he was awarded a C.M.G. in 1946. At various stages of his career, he was a Fellow of the Royal Society of Canada, the president of the Canadian Institute of Chemistry, an original member of the Biochemical Society, and secretary for the Scientific Club of Winnipeg.

Following a long illness, Alexander Thomas Cameron died on September 25, 1947, either at his residence in Winnipeg or at Winnipeg General Hospital. He was survived by his wife, his son Alistair, and his daughter Janet.

== Personal life ==
As its secretary, Cameron dedicated much of his time to the Scientific Club of Winnipeg. Cameron was a fluent reader of English, French, and German, and enjoyed reading literature. His favourite hobby was stamp collecting, a pursuit which "gave limitless scope for his methodical ways and zest for minutiae."

== See also ==
- Biochemical Society
