= St Clare John Byrne =

British naval architect

St Clare John Byrne (1831-1915) was a British naval architect, who specialized in the design of luxury yachts during the late Victorian and early Edwardian period.

== Family background ==
His father, Charles Holtzendorf Byrne (1781-1853), was an Irish ship owner who in 1812 married Scottish Susanna Ewing (1789–1868). They had 8 children, 4 of whom were born in Renfrew Scotland and the remainder in Liverpool, including St Clare Byrne.

By the age of 20 Byrne was a merchant’s clerk, living with his parents in Birkenhead, an area associated with shipbuilding.

In 1867 he married Kate Chatteris, they had 3 children: Henry, Arthur and Lionel. Byrne's granddaughter was Muriel St. Clare Byrne (1894-1983), historian and author. She and her mother lived with Byrne after her father died in 1905; she would later say of him that he was a genius.

== Shipbuilding ==
Byrne's elder brother, shipping merchant Andrew Ewing Byrne (1818-1908), was a keen yachtsman. Byrne followed his interest, but designed and built his own yacht. In 1856 he was elected a member of the Royal Mersey Yacht Club.

By the mid 1850s he was designing larger vessels constructed in iron for the shipyard Brassey, Peto and Betts of Canada Works at Birkenhead. These included the paddle steamer Elizabeth Jackson (143 ft), Edith Byrne (729 tons) for his brother Andrew, and the yacht Albatross (110 tons) for Thomas Brassey, son of a proprietor of the Canada Works.

In 1865 he was Superintendent Shipbuilder in the Humber Iron Works and later a partner in shipbuilding company called Byrne, Humphreys & Co. of Hull; the partnership was dissolved in 1867. In the early 1870s he was designing merchant ships and private yachts often constructed as composite, where the frame was made of iron but planked in wood. He delivered a paper on this subject to the Institute of Naval Architects in 1878.

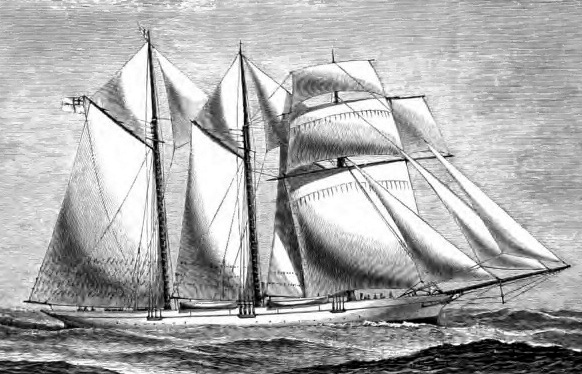
Thomas Brassey's yacht Sunbeam

Byrne designed a steam auxiliary barquentine yacht for Thomas Brassey of composite construction named Sunbeam. It was 532 tons, 159 ft in length, built by Bowdler and Chaffer’s in Seacombe and launched in 1874 . Sunbeam would become one of the most famous private yachts of the period. Brassey took the yacht on a world cruise with his wife Anna (Allnutt) Brassey (1839-1887) and their children. Anna wrote a book describing their travels and this became a best seller, reprinted many times and translated into many languages. In 1915 Brassey sailed Sunbeam to Mudros Bay to act as a hospital ship during the Gallipoli campaign.

In 1877 the first of 3 yachts Byrne designed for Manchester industrialist Samuel Radcliff Platt was launched; they were all named Norseman. The second, launched in 1890, was sold to American owners and served in the First World War as USS Mohican (SP-117); bought in 1931 by the Canadian banker Sir Charles Gordon and registered at Glasgow, she carried her original name again until his death in 1939.

The Lancashire Witch was designed and built for Sir Thomas George Fermor-Hesketh on the lines of Sunbeam and launched in 1877. Like Brassey, Hesketh went on a world tour in the Lancashire Witch and on one of the legs set a record for the crossing between the Falkland Islands and South Africa. The Lancashire Witch was sold to the Admiralty in 1893 and become HMS Waterwitch.

Two American clients, James Gordon Bennett and William Kissam Vanderbilt, had yachts designed by Byrne, but built in America. Vanderbilt's yacht Alva was sunk in 1892 and Byrne was commissioned to design a replacement, the Valiant at 2148 tons, said to be the largest yacht in the world. This was constructed in Britain by Laird Brothers at Birkenhead.

Byrne continued to design yachts into his senior years: Portia designed for Col Herbert A Foster and built by Cammell Laird was launched in 1906 when Byrne was 75. Portia was used by the Royal Navy during WWI as armed yacht Portia II, becoming involved with the chase and final sinking of German submarine U12.

St Clare John Byrne died on 13 December 1915 aged 86 and was buried at Holy Trinity Church, then Hoylake Parish church. The church has since been demolished but the grave yard remains. Sadly, Byrne's tomb stone is now damaged and overgrown.

=== Table ===
Many of the larger yachts (over 100 tons) designed by St Clare Byrne are listed below. The list does not included his designs for small yachts or merchant vessels. Source data from contemporary Lloyd's Yacht Registers.

Yacht Name	Tons	Year	Builder	Owner When Launched
Albatross	110	1859	Canada Works	Thomas Brassey
Nooya	160	1870	Laird Brothers (378)	John Thomas Molson
Sirex	102	1871	Bowdler & Chaffer, Seacombe	Sir Hickman Bacon
Modwena	225	1872	Bowdler & Chaffer Seacombe	John Gretton
Sunbeam	532	1874	Bowdler & Chaffer Seacombe	Thomas Brassey
Norseman	221	1875	Laird Brothers (428)	Samuel Radcliffe Platt
Dobhran	440	1876	Cunliffe & Dunlop	Thomas Valentine Smith
Lancashire Witch	479	1877	B Steele & Co., Greenock	Sir Thomas George Fermor-Hesketh
Amy	416	1877	Barrow Shipbuilding Company, Barrow	Ninian B Stewart
Margaret	395	1877	Barrow Shipbuilding Company, Barrow	H Jameson
Amy	639	1880	Cunliffe & Dunlop Glasgow	Ninian B Stewart
Chonita	122	1880	Thomas Brassey & Co Birkenhead	Henry Pigeon
Cruiser	470	1881	Barrow Shipbuilding Company, Barrow	Earl of Eglinton
Gelert	122	1881	J Fullerton & Co., Paisley	Albert Wood
Namouna	740	1882	Ward Stanton & Co., Newburg, Hudson USA	James Gordon Bennett, Jr.
Cuhona/Empress	498	1882	Earles Shipbuilding & Engineering Company	Sir Andrew B Walker
Gaviota	159	1882	J Fullerton & Co., Paisley	Don Thomas Heredia
Gitana	471	1882	Ramage & Ferguson, Leith	Henry Jameson
Rover	565	1882	Ramage & Ferguson, Leith	Earl of Eglinton
Alva	1241	1886	Harlan & Hollingsworth Wilmington USA	W K Vanderbilt
Miranda	349	1886	Ramage & Ferguson, Leith	Baron Ashburton
St Kilda	142	1887	J Reid & Co., Glasgow	E J Allcard
Jeannette	147	1888	Cochran & Co., Birkenhead	Frederick Platt
Red Eagle	305	1888	Ramage & Ferguson, Leith	Charles J Fletcher
Norseman	325	1890	Laird Brothers (538)	Samuel Radcliffe Platt
Lady Ina	459	1891	Ramage & Ferguson, Leith	John Anderson
Athena	332	1892	London & Glasgow Engineering and Iron Shipbuilding Company	R Clifford Smith
Jeannette	225	1892	The Naval Construction & Armament Co Barrow	Frederick Platt
Valiant	2184	1893	Laird Brothers (594)	W K Vanderbilt
Maria	812	1893	Napier Shanks & Bell Glasgow	Ninian B Stewart
Zoraide	549	1894	Earle Ship Building Company	Thomas J Waller
St Elian	283	1894	Ramage & Ferguson, Leith	Col Henry Platt
Erl-King	565	1894	Ramage & Ferguson, Leith	Maj Alex H Davis
Arcturus	474	1895	Ramage & Ferguson, Leith	R Stuyesant
Lady Sofia	307	1895	Ramage & Ferguson, Leith	W H Robertson
Kethailes	479	1897	Ramage & Ferguson, Leith	William Johnston
Leon Pauilhac	308	1897	Ramage & Ferguson, Leith	Pauilac, Calvat, Marsan
Jeannette	313	1898	Vickers Sons and Maxim Barrow	Frederick Platt
Norseman	521	1898	D & W Henderson Ltd Glasgow,	Samuel Radcliffe Platt
Sabrina	513	1899	Vickers Sons and Maxim Barrow	Sir William H Wills
Portia	527	1906	Cammell Laird Birkenhead (666)	Col Herbert A Foster

== Additional Interests ==
St Clare John Byrne was a keen golfer and a member of the Royal Liverpool Golf Club, Hoylake having joined in 1890. When younger he was a leading marksman in the 2nd Cheshire Rifle Volunteers. He continued to take an interest in sailing, becoming president of the Hoylake Sailing Club in his later years.
