= Medical Research Society =

British medical institute

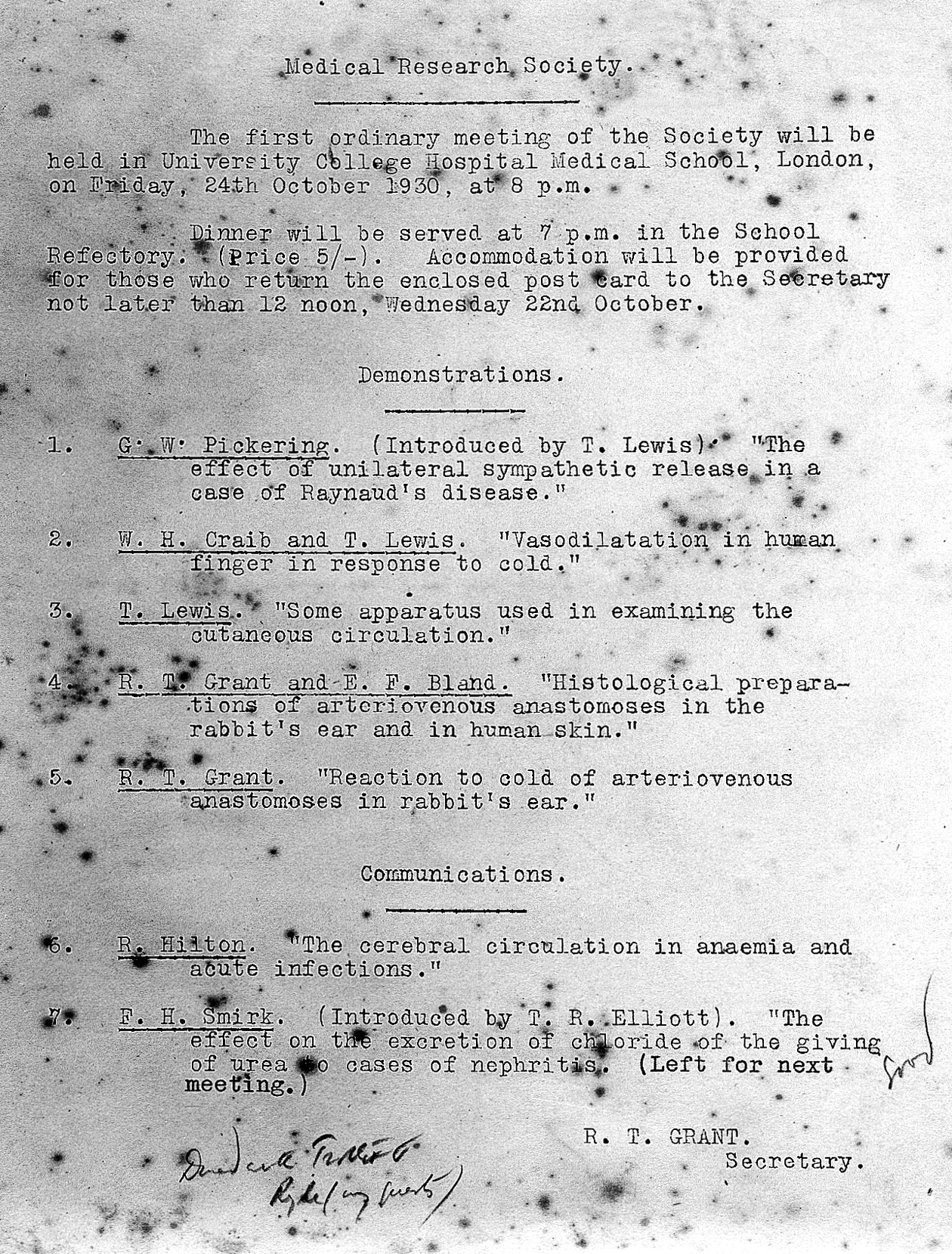
Minutes from the first meeting of the Medical Research Society, 24 October 1930.

The Medical Research Society (MRS) was founded by Sir Thomas Lewis in 1930. The Society was 'instituted for the purpose of advancing knowledge of the causes and processes of disease, by clinical or related experimental studies in man’. The MRS published the journal Clinical Science from 1945 until 1961, and then jointly with the Biochemical Society until 2003. The MRS continued to hold regular research meetings until October 2011 when it merged with the Academy of Medical Sciences. The Academy of Medical Sciences now awards an annual Medical Research Society prize for pre-PhD (Foundation Year doctors and Academic Clinical Fellows) and PhD students.

== History ==
The MRS was formed following a report by a subcommittee of the UK Medical Research Council on the ‘Future Policy for the Promotion of Clinical Research’. The report was written by Lewis, Thomas Renton Elliott, Wilfred Trotter and John Parsons. The first meeting of the Society was held on 24 October at University College Hospital. At its formation the Society had 18 ordinary members and 2 honorary members, Archibald Garrod and John Scott Haldane. The first demonstration at the first meeting was on 'The effect of unilateral sympathetic release in a case of Raynaud's disease' by George Pickering.
