= Dibromoanthracene =

Numbering on anthracene skeleton

A dibromoanthracene is a derivative of anthracene with two bromine atoms. All compounds have the formula C_{14}H_{8}Br_{2}. They are all isomers of one another.

| Compound | CAS number |
|---|---|
| 1,2-Dibromoanthracene | 38193-30-5 |
| 1,3-Dibromoanthracene | |
| 1,4-Dibromoanthracene | |
| 1,5-Dibromoanthracene | 3278-82-8 |
| 1,6-dibromoanthracene | |
| 1,8-Dibromoanthracene | 131276-24-9 |
| 1,9-dibromoanthracene | 92610-89-4 |
| 1,10-dibromoanthracene | |
| 2,3-Dibromoanthracene | 117820-97-0 |
| 2,6-Dibromoanthracene | 186517-01-1 |
| 2,7-Dibromoanthracene | 63469-82-9 |
| 3,9-Dibromoanthracene | |
| 9,10-Dibromoanthracene | 523-27-3 |
