= William Cramer =

William Cramer may refer to:

- William Cramer (pathologist) (1878–1945), German-born pathologist
- William C. Cramer (1922–2003), U.S. Representative from Florida
