= HMY Kethailes =

Yacht of the British Royal Navy

History

United Kingdom
- Name: Kethailes
- Namesake: Kathleen, Ethel, Aileen and Estele Johnston
- Owner: William Johnston
- Builder: Richardson, Duck & Co
- Yard number: 535
- Launched: 11 April 1903
- Completed: May 1903
- Commissioned: 1914

United Kingdom
- Name: HMY Kethailes
- Commissioned: 24 September 1914
- Out of service: 11 October 1917
- Fate: Sunk by collision

General characteristics
- Type: Steam yacht
- Tonnage: 625 GRT
- Propulsion: triple expansion engine

HMY Kethailes was a steam yacht that was launched in 1903 as a private pleasure craft and commissioned into the Royal Navy in 1914. She was sunk in a collision in 1917 with the loss of 17 of her crew.

== Private yacht ==
St Clare John Byrne designed the yacht for William Johnston of Liverpool. Richardson, Duck and Company built her at Thornaby-on-Tees, County Durham, England. She was launched on 11 April 1903. Johnston invented her name by concatenating letters from the names of his four daughters: Kathleen, Ethel, Aileen and Estele.

== Naval service ==
When World War I began in 1914 the Royal Navy needed more ships. On 24 September 1914 Johnston voluntarily handed over the yacht (later receiving financial compensation) to the Admiralty, for use as an Armed Naval Auxiliary. She was commissioned as Armed Yacht No. 118032 in the Yacht Patrol. She patrolled the North Sea, then was transferred to the Irish Sea.

On 28 September 1917 Kethailes was first-on-scene and assisted the cargo ship William Middleton, which had hit a mine laid by SM UC-75. Two ratings were killed. The Commanding Officer, Lt Comdr Lane RNR and his crew were commended for preventing William Middleton from sinking.

== Loss ==
On 11 October 1917 the troop ship Leicestershire accidentally rammed Kethailes in the Irish Sea near the Blackwater Lightship, which marks the Blackwater Bank off the east coast of County Wexford in Ireland. 17 of Kethailes's crew were killed.

Leicestershire and the P-class sloop P.44 rescued survivors, including her commander, and they were landed at Liverpool. The dead were lost at sea. Several bodies were subsequently washed ashore on the Welsh coast and were buried in local churchyards. In July 2022 CWGC accepted identification research of Able Seaman Frederick Dyer, previously buried as an unknown sailor in a communal grave in the Churchyard of St Matthew Borth, Dyfed.
