= Textbook of Biochemistry =

1928 book by Alexander Thomas Cameron

- Title page for Textbook of Biochemistry (3rd Edition, 1932)
- Author: Alexander Thomas Cameron
- Language: English
- Subject: Biochemistry
- Publisher: The Macmillan Company
- Publication date: 1928 (1st edition)
- Publication place: United States
- Media type: Print
- Pages: 462

Textbook of Biochemistry, first published in 1928, is scientific textbook authored by Alexander Thomas Cameron. The textbook became a standard of its field, and, by 1948, had gone through six editions, in addition to one Chinese and two Spanish editions.

== Publication ==
Textbook of Biochemistry consists entirely of lecture manuscripts given by the author, Alexander Thomas Cameron, over several years. Cameron had lectured at the University of Manitoba since 1909, but was never a fluent speaker. To compensate for this, he would write out his lectures in full. Cameron was encouraged by students and friends to submit his lecture manuscripts for publication. The textbook's first edition was published with a preface by Swale Vincent, Professor of Physiology at the University of London.

== Structure ==
Textbook of Biochemistry is divided into the following chapters:

- Introduction

Introduction to the concept of biochemistry, and a review of catalytic reactions and pH.

- Food-Stuffs, Their Derivatives and Related Substances.

Ideas regarding carbohydrates, lipids, and proteins.

- The Chemistry of Digestion, the Circulation, and the Excreto.

The importance of bacterial and chemical activity in organisms.

- Intermediate Metabolism

The chemistry of tissues, intracellular synthesis, products of metabolism, and vitamins.

- The Chemistry of Reproduction; The Chemical Controlling Agencies of the Organism.

The agents governing metabolic processes.

- Quantitative Metabolism.
- Addenda.

A review of the present status of immunological biochemistry, and applications of biochemistry in industry.

== Reception ==
Treat B. Johnson, writing for the Journal of Chemical Education, acknowledged the difficulty of concisely covering the rapidly growing field of biochemistry, but concluded that Cameron has "done quite well." He described Textbook of Biochemistry as "not a book that follows the ordinary logical procedure usually associated with such texts," and complements Cameron on a "dogmatic treatment which is really stimulating."

The British Medical Journal also gave a favourable review, writing that "the busy medical student will find this book a concise account of the facts with which he is expected to become familiar." However, it also observed that the book contains several statements that are "definitely not in agreement with the facts as at present known." The reviewer contradicts, for example, the book's assertions that urinal ammonia is formed in the kidneys from urea, and that pepsin does not attack the CO-NH links in proteins.

Textbook of Biochemistry, being the first concise and authoritative work in its field, became a standard text. By 1948, it had gone through six editions, in addition to one Chinese and two Spanish editions.
