= Selig Hecht =

American physiologist and author (1892–1947)

- Born: February 8, 1892; Glogau, German Empire
- Died: September 18, 1947 (aged 55); New York, United States
- Education: City College of New York; Harvard University
- Known for: Explaining the Atom (1947)
- Spouse: Celia Huebschmann
- Scientific career
- Thesis: The physiology of Ascidia atra Lesueur (1917)
- Doctoral advisor: G. H. Parker

Selig Hecht (February 8, 1892 – September 18, 1947) was an American professor of biophysics who specialized in the physiology of vision. His scientific papers included studies of photochemistry in photoreceptor cells. At the time of his death, he became known to the general public for having authored Explaining the Atom (1947), which was praised as "a classic of popular scientific writing".

== Biography ==
Hecht was born into a Jewish family in Glogau, then in the German Empire (now Głogów, Poland). His parents were Mandel Hecht and Mirel Mresse. The family migrated to the U.S. in 1898, settling in New York City.

In 1913, Hecht received a Bachelor of Science degree from City College of New York. In 1917 he earned a Ph.D. from Harvard. That same year he married Celia Huebschmann. In 1924 their daughter Maressa was born. In 1928, Hecht was appointed professor of biophysics at Columbia University, where he remained until his death.

In addition to his scientific research, Hecht was regarded as an excellent lecturer and expositor of science. The physiologist Maurice Pirenne said of him: "The lack of synthesis discernible in present-day knowledge and teaching perturbed [Hecht], and he took an active interest in all the human implications of science."

== Scientific career ==
Hecht began his study of light sensitivity using clams (Mya arenaria) and insects. His specialty was photochemistry, the kinetics of the reactions initiated by light in the receptors. He made contributions to the knowledge of dark adaptation, visual acuity, brightness discrimination, color vision, and the mechanism of the visual threshold.

He spent time as a postdoctoral researcher in a group led by Edward Charles Cyril Baly at the University of Liverpool. Baly was a pioneer in applying the technique of spectroscopy to chemistry. Hecht extended his mentor's methods by applying spectroscopy to biological problems, which inspired the work of Richard Alan Morton.

Hecht's achievement in showing the protein character of rhodopsin was recognized by historians of protein science:

Identification of visual purple as a protein of high molecular weight ...[came] from the work of Selig Hecht at Columbia University in New York, begun in 1937. Ultracentrifugation was one of the methods he used for characterization and this produced an added dividend, demonstrating that the complex absorption of the 'pigment' (suggesting the possibility of many components) segmented in toto with the protein. By this time the carotenoid prosthetic group had been discovered as the source of colour by George Wald and Hecht pointed out that this meant that the protein had to be a conjugated protein, with the chromophore firmly attached.

In 1941, Hecht won the Optical Society of America's Frederic Ives Medal. The following year, the CCNY Alumni Association awarded him its Townsend Harris Medal. In 1944 he was elected to the National Academy of Sciences.

During World War II, Hecht directed and consulted on a number of visual projects for the Army and Navy. He was co-developer of an adaptometer for night-vision testing that was adopted as standard equipment by several Allied military services.

On September 18, 1947, Selig Hecht died at his home of a coronary thrombosis. He was 55.

== Explaining the Atom ==
World War II ended with the use of atomic weapons developed in secret by the Manhattan Project. Hecht wanted ordinary Americans to understand this new source of energy. He first educated himself in atomic physics using publicly available sources. In 1945 he joined the Emergency Committee of Atomic Scientists, "headed by Einstein and formed for the purpose of informing the public on problems of atomic energy." In 1946, Hecht wrote Explaining the Atom, which was published in early 1947. He noted in the Preface that his aim was to "help to make intelligent voters":

So long as one supposes this business is mysterious and secret, one cannot have a just evaluation of our possession and security. Only by understanding the basis and development of atomic energy can one judge the legislation and foreign policy that concern it.

In a review in The New York Times, Stephen Wheeler said that Explaining the Atom was "by all odds the best book on atomic energy so far to be published for the ordinary reader." Similarly, James J. Jelinek wrote that it was an "invaluable contribution to the layman." He credited Hecht with "conveying to the layman the intellectual drama" of the quest to unlock the atom. Jelinek asserted that the book was "profoundly provocative in its political and sociological implications."

In 1954 a revised edition of Explaining the Atom, with four additional chapters, was issued by Eugene Rabinowitch. Both editions were recommended by George Gamow.

== Selected publications ==
- Hecht, S. (1937) "Rods, cones, and the chemical basis of vision", Physiological Reviews 17: 239 to 89.
- Hecht, S. & Pickels, E.G. (1938) "The sedimentation constant of visual purple", Proceedings of the National Academy of Sciences of the USA 24: 172 to 6
