= Swale Vincent =

British physiologist

Thomas Swale Vincent
- Born: 24 May 1868
- Died: 31 December 1933 (aged 65)
- Education: Mason Science College (later the University of Birmingham)
- Known for: Early research on ductless glands
- Scientific career
- Fields: Physiologist; endocrinologist
- Workplaces: Mason Science College later the University of Birmingham); University of Manitoba; University of London

Thomas Swale Vincent (24 May 1868 – 31 December 1933) was a British physiologist who spent most of his working life in Canada.

== Early years ==
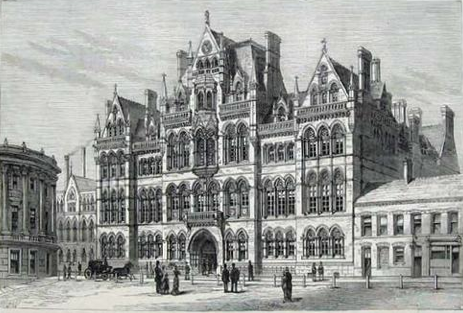
Mason Science College, now the University of Birmingham

Thomas Swale Vincent was born in Birmingham on 24 May 1868, the son of Joseph Vincent and his wife, Margaret Swale.

He was educated at King Edward VI Grammar School in Birmingham, and subsequently studied medicine at Mason Science College (which later became the University of Birmingham), graduating MB in 1894. At age 24, Swale qualified in medicine, and travelled to the University of Heidelberg to study under Albrecht Kossel. He then returned to Mason Science College as a demonstrator of physiology.

== Career ==
In 1896, Vincent's first paper, entitled "The Suprarenal Capsules in the Lower Vertebrates," was published in The Proceedings of the Birmingham Natural History and Philosophical Society. This research earned him a BMA Research Scholarship, presenting the opportunity to work with E.A. Schäfer, the original discoverer of the suprarenal capsules, at University College in London. In 1897, Vincent succeeded Benjamin Moore as Sharpey Scholar, becoming assistant professor to Schäfer, and, in 1899, to Ernest Starling.

In 1900, Vincent was appointed a lecturer at Cardiff, where his students included future cardiologist Thomas Lewis, with whom he published two papers on the biochemistry of muscle. Lewis later wrote, "I have always been grateful to Vincent for giving me my first introduction to scientific work." Two years later, he was awarded the Francis Mason Research Scholarship, and rejoined Schäfer, now at the University of Edinburgh, to study the physiology of the thymus and other ductless glands. In 1904 he was awarded a Doctor of Science from the University of Edinburgh for his thesis on Addison's disease and the functions of the suprarenal capsules.

In 1904, Vincent was appointed the first professor of physiology at the University of Manitoba in Winnipeg, Manitoba, Canada. Here, he oversaw the research of biochemist Alexander Thomas Cameron, and was influential in fostering Cameron's interest in endocrinology. In 1910, Vincent was elected a Fellow of the Royal Society of Edinburgh. His proposers were Sir Edward Albert Sharpey-Schafer, William Cramer, James Cossar Ewart and Orlando Charnock Bradley. Vincent remained at Manitoba until 1920, when he returned to London to become professor of physiology at Middlesex Hospital. He retired from this post in 1930.

== Personal life ==
In 1914, he married Beatrice Overton, daughter of Mr. W. Overton, and had two daughters; all three survived him. Vincent's shyness sometimes gave an impression of brusqueness, but friends knew him as a "staunch friend and a charming companion." Vincent, who practised as a pianist, also had a deep love of music.

== Attitudes ==
Vincent's research on endocrinology earned him a strong international reputation in his field. He was known for his "highly critical and sceptical mind," and was described by colleague William Cramer as "a man of firm principles and high ideals on which he would not compromise."
