= 9,10-Dibromoanthracene =

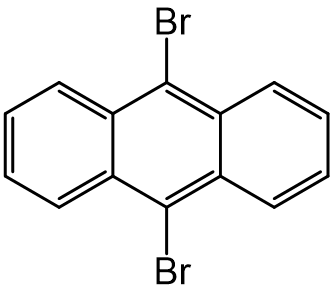

Names
- Preferred IUPAC name 9,10-Dibromoanthracene

Identifiers
CAS Number	523-27-3
3D model (JSmol)	Interactive image
ChEMBL	ChEMBL3183379
ChemSpider	61529
ECHA InfoCard	100.007.586
EC Number	208-342-4
PubChem CID	68226
UNII	61CP7C5Y82
CompTox Dashboard (EPA)	DTXSID5049312
- InChI: InChI=1S/C14H8Br2/c15-13-9-5-1-2-6-10(9)14(16)12-8-4-3-7-11(12)13/h1-8H Key: BRUOAURMAFDGLP-UHFFFAOYSA-N
- SMILES: C1=CC=C2C(=C1)C(=C3C=CC=CC3=C2Br)Br

Properties
Chemical formula	C_{14}H_{8}Br_{2}
Molar mass	336.026 g·mol^{−1}

Hazards
- GHS labelling
Pictograms	(GHS07: Exclamation mark) (GHS09: Environmental hazard)
Signal word	Warning
Hazard statements	H315, H319, H335, H410
Precautionary statements	P261, P264, P271, P273, P280, P302+P352, P304+P340, P305+P351+P338, P312, P321, P332+P313, P337+P313, P362, P391, P403+P233, P405, P501
- Except where otherwise noted, data are given for materials in their standard state (at 25 °C [77 °F], 100 kPa). Infobox references

9,10-Dibromoanthracene is an organic chemical compound containing anthracene with two bromine atoms substituted on its central ring. It is notable in that it was the first single molecule to have a chemical reaction observed by an atomic force microscope and scanning tunneling microscopy.

== Production ==
Ian M. Heilbron and John S. Heaton were the first to synthesize this in 1923 in England.

== Properties ==
9,10-Dibromoanthracene is electroluminescent, giving off a blue light.

== Reactions ==
The carbon–bromine bonds can be fragmented in two successive steps by voltage pulses from tip of a scanning tunneling microscope. The resulting carbon radicals are stabilized by the sodium chloride substrate on which the 9,10-dibromoanthracene reactant was placed. Further voltage pulses cause the diradical to convert to a diyne (or back again) via a Bergman cyclization reaction.

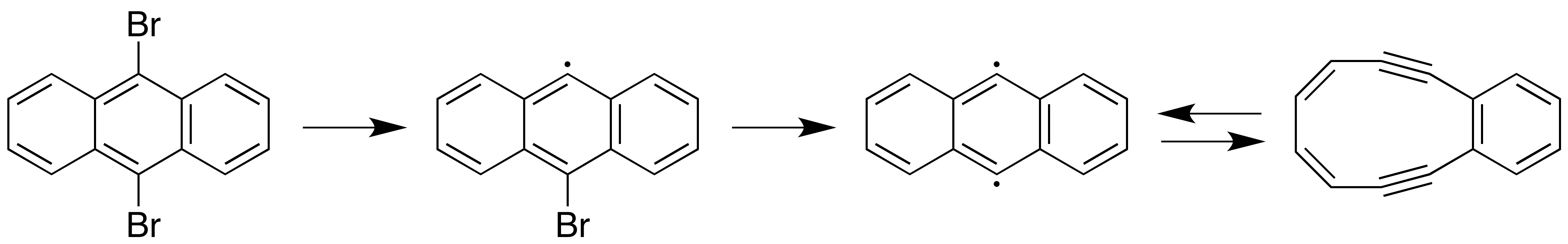
