= Johnston Laboratories =

Coordinates: 53.4071°N 2.967°W

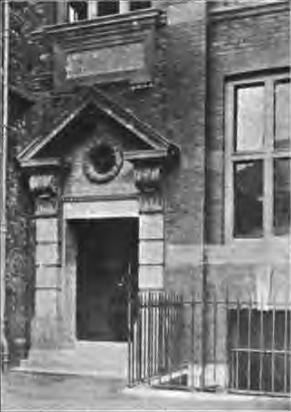
Entryway to the laboratory building in 1903

The Johnston Laboratories at the University of Liverpool in Liverpool, England, performed a variety of pathology and medical research during the 20th century. They are now located in the Johnston Building. The Laboratories were founded by early University benefactor and ship owner William Johnston and formally opened on 9 May 1903. Research activities of the Laboratories were documented in the Thompson Yates and Johnston Laboratories Report by the University of Liverpool Press. During the 1900s and 1910s the Liverpool School of Tropical Medicine was partly housed in the laboratories.

== Original facilities ==
=== Laboratory of Bio-Chemistry ===
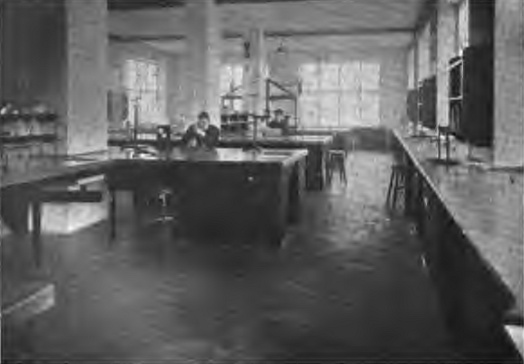
Laboratory of Bio-Chemistry

The Bio-Chemical Laboratory occupies the entire top floor, and consists of four rooms fitted up solely for research work upon chemical problems connected with the various departments of biological science.

The principal room is 60 feet long and 30 feet wide, and is well lighted by ten large windows, 12 feet by 9 feet, the small remaining wall space being faced with white-glazed tiles, a wall cupboard being fixed to each pier to hold stock reagents and standard solutions. A complete belt of benches runs round the walls, and the middle of the room is practically divided into four working compartments by two large H-shaped benches, having an outside measurement of 22 feet by 16 feet. By this arrangement the laboratory is divided into bays in which investigators can work surrounded on all sides by working benches. The floor of the rooms and the tops of the benches are constructed of polished lito-silo, a material which lends itself well to such purposes on account of its resiliency, warmth, and non-absorbent properties. Drawers and presses are fitted underneath the benches for the storage of materials and apparatus, a free space being, however, left in the middle of each working space for convenience in sitting. Two large fume chambers, 9 feet by 3 feet, are built into the central benches, one at each end of the room, and contain six gas jets, regulated from outside, so that the fittings cannot be attacked by the fumes. Sinks are arranged in the wall benches opposite each pier, and each of the large central benches is provided with eight sinks. In addition, there are two large sinks placed one at either end of the room for washing glass apparatus. Steam is provided by a main pipe carried up the track of the lift and conducted along the wall on one side of the room for a distance of 1 8 feet, distribution taps with screw-down valves being provided at intervals of 3 feet for the attachment of steam baths and other heating appliances. The steam supply is also made use of for the production of distilled water by means of a suitable apparatus.

Opening from the south end of the large room is the Professor's Research Room, measuring 20 feet by 16 feet, provided with working bench, fume chamber, and cupboards.

To the east of this room, and communicating both with it and with the large room, is the Balance Room, provided with slate slabs for the support of the balances, let into the wall to ensure greater steadiness. The walls of this room are lined with bookcases, and there are wr1ting tables under the windows.

The fourth room, situated on the west side of the Professor's room is designed as a working library for the use of workers in the laboratory, and is fitted up with bookcases and a writing table.

The whole laboratory is admirably lighted by large windows, and is fitted with the electric light. It is warmed by hot water, and ventilated by the upper parts of the windows and by extraction shafts arranged down the centre.

This is the first laboratory that has been constructed in Great Britain solely for carrying out research work in bio-chemistry.

— , The Opening of the Johnston Laboratories

=== Laboratories of Experimental Medicine and Cancer Research ===
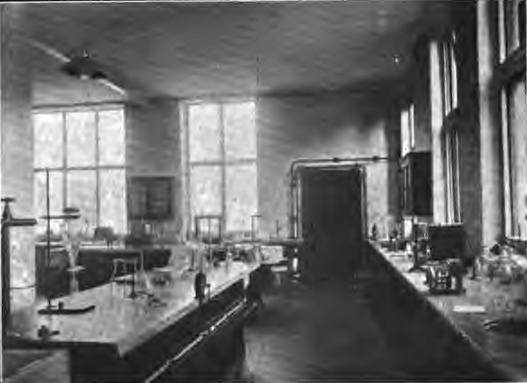
Laboratories of Experimental Medicine and Cancer Research

The department of Experimental Medicine is housed on the first floor. One end of the rectangle is taken up by the Director of the Cancer Research. This room has window benches along the south and east sides, while in the centre are two tables, fitted with drawers, and with sinks at each end. The room has been equipped with all necessary apparatus for the histological and experimental investigation of cancer. Attention may be drawn especially to a very fine microscope by Swift, and a new mincing machine by Cogit, of Paris, by which tissues can be reduced to a state fine enough for injection with an ordinary syringe.

In the machine room in the basement is a centrifuge and disintegrator belonging to the equipment of the Research.

The other (north) end of the rectangle is divided into two private research rooms, each having two windows. The intervening portion is divided by a narrow corridor, on the east side of which are (1) the attendants' compartment, with large sink for washing up, shelves, etc., and a large slate on which are placed the autoclave and Koch's sterilizer connected with the laboratory steam supply; (2) the incubator room, which is glazed up to the ceiling, in it are placed the incubator and the hot-air sterilizer, on slabs, and the glass-blower's table; (3) a small room at present used for stores.

On the west side, next the entrance door and just opposite the Director's room, is the electrical room. In this is placed out of reach and danger an induction X-ray coil, giving a 24-inch spark; while on the floor is a series of accumulators, charged from the main, for working the coil. A complete outfit for X-ray work is provided; also a small resonator for applying the high frequency current and a large solenoid within which the patient can be placed. A new model arc lamp for investigating the therapeutic action of light, taking a current of fifty amperes, is also fixed in this room. It can be carefully darkened if necessary. Beyond this is a room for experimental pathology, and after this another research room. The Director's, the incubator, and the electrical room are glazed to the ceiling; the others are separated by screens or cupboards, seven feet high, and the corridor is formed in the same way. There is consequently through ventilation for the whole floor. The fume chamber is placed in the corridor, and ventilates into the main flue.

Belonging to the Cancer Research is also a greenhouse, in which animals accustomed to a tropical climate can be kept.

— , The Opening of the Johnston Laboratories

=== Laboratories of Tropical Medicine ===
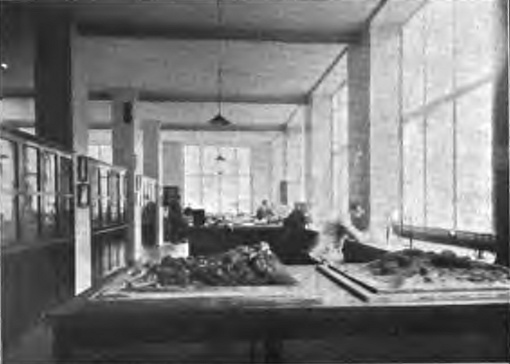
Laboratories of Tropical Medicine

These are situated on the first floor of the Johnston Laboratories, and are contained within a large room, about 95 feet long and 35 feet broad. The main part of the room is devoted to students, but three chambers are partitioned off for the special use of persons who wish to do research work in connexion with Tropical Medicine and Parasitology, each of these rooms having all fittings and appliances for this purpose. One end of the floor contains the professor's room and the incubator room. The whole is walled with white glazed tiles. The floor is rendered impermeable by a layer of deep red lito-silo. Along the walls of the whole floor there runs a bench for microscope work, covered with a thick layer of sea-blue lito-silo. Electric light, gas, and water are suitably fitted at distances of every four yards of this bench for the use of students. The partitions of the room are fitted with cupboards, in which the museum of tropical diseases, which the school is now purchasing, is being arranged. Steam is also laid on to the laboratory, which possesses all the necessary apparatus. There is accommodation for quite forty workers in the new laboratory of the school.

— , The Opening of the Johnston Laboratories

=== Laboratories of Comparative Pathology ===
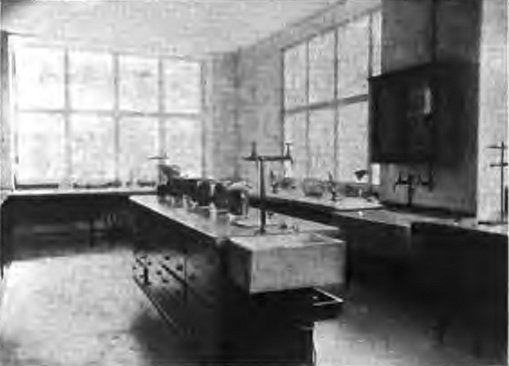
Laboratories of Comparative Pathology

The Institute of Comparative Pathology occupies the basement of the new Johnston Laboratory, and comprises the lecturer's private laboratory, a general laboratory, incubating room, sterilizing room, and a post-mortem room.

The laboratories are fitted with window benches and tables, and have a complete outfit of gas, water, and electrical fittings; the walls are tiled with white glazed tiles, and the floors and bench tops are covered with lito-silo. Each side of the partitions dividing the area into sections is fitted with cupboards, which will be largely utilized for museum purposes. The post-mortem room will be fitted with a post-mortem table for large animals.

These laboratories will be furnished for lectures, demonstrations, and practical work in the subjects of comparative pathology and bacteriology, and also for the testing of various vaccines and sera prepared at the Institute's Farm Station. Facilities will also be afforded for acquiring the technique necessary for the manufacture of these products, and also for research work. Practical instruction in the physiological and pathological actions of these and allied substances will also be provided.

The farm in connection with the Institute is favourably situated in a most suitable and accessible agricultural district in North Cheshire. It has been provided with laboratories, fitted up with modern scientific appliances and apparatus for the production on a large scale of vaccines and sera. A general bacteriological laboratory, an incubating room, mixing, distributing, and sterilizing rooms, and a separate room specially set apart for the preparation of calf-lymph vaccine, and another room for plague prophylactic and serum, make up the laboratory accommodation.

The preparation of the various sera and vaccines will be carried on at the farm station, and opportunities will be afforded to those interested in the subject to acquire the principles of their manufacture, and also to avail themselves of the practice in veterinary science at the out-patient department shortly to be established.

— , The Opening of the Johnston Laboratories

=== Machine Room ===
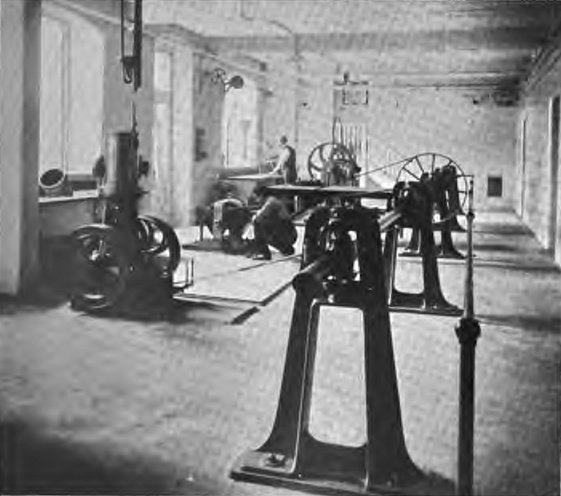
Machine Room

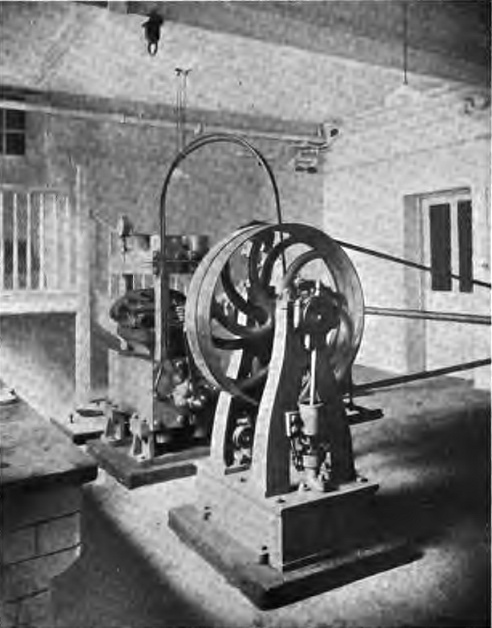
200-ton press

A large room has been fitted in the Thompson Yates laboratories with apparatus for the use of the various research departments. Shafting running the length of the room is driven by a 10 horse-power motor, and from the shaft is driven an hydraulic press giving a total pressure of 200 tons, a high-pressure filtering apparatus, and gas liquefier, and a powerful centrifuge. From a smaller motor and shafting is driven a large centrifuge, a vaccine mill, a bacterial mill and disintegrating apparatus. The shafting is so constructed that new apparatus can be added as occasion requires.

— , The Opening of the Johnston Laboratories
