= SS Zamzam =

History
- Name: 1909: Leicestershire; 1931: British Exhibitor; 1933: Zamzam
- Namesake: 1909: Leicestershire; 1933: Zamzam Well
- Owner: 1909: Bibby Steamship Co Ltd; 1930: British Nat Exhibition Ship Ltd; 1933: Egyptian Co for Travel & Nav
- Operator: Bibby Brothers & Co
- Port of registry: 1909: (United Kingdom) Liverpool; 1933: (Kingdom of Egypt) Alexandria
- Route: until 1930: Liverpool – Rangoon
- Builder: Harland and Wolff, Belfast
- Yard number: 403
- Launched: 3 June 1909
- Completed: 11 September 1909
- Identification: UK official number 127995; Until 1933: code letters HPRD; By 1913: call sign MYL; By 1930: call sign SUBZ
- Fate: scuttled 17 April 1941

General characteristics
- Type: Ocean liner
- Tonnage: as built: 8,299 GRT, 5,165 NRT by 1930: 8,059 GRT, 5,034 NRT
- Length: 467.2 ft (142.4 m)
- Beam: 54.3 ft (16.6 m)
- Draught: 27 ft 8 in (8.43 m)
- Depth: 31.7 ft (9.7 m)
- Installed power: 823 NHP
- Propulsion: 2 × quadruple expansion engines; 2 × screws
- Speed: 14 to 15 knots (26 to 28 km/h)
- Capacity: as built: 230 passengers; 1,629 cubic feet (46.1 m^{3}) refrigerated cargo; 1933: 600 pilgrims
- Sensors & processing systems: direction finding (by 1930); submarine signalling
- Notes: sister ship: Gloucestershire

SS Zamzam was a steam ocean liner that was launched in 1909 in Ireland and scuttled in 1941 in the South Atlantic.

She was launched as Leicestershire and was a UK troop ship in the First World War. In 1930 she was converted into an exhibition ship and renamed British Exhibitor.

In 1933 she was bought by an Egyptian company that renamed her Zamzam and had her converted into a pilgrim ship. In 1941 she took passengers from Egypt to the USA. On her return voyage to Egypt a German merchant raider attacked and scuttled her.

== Building ==
Harland and Wolff built Leicestershire in Belfast for the Bibby Steamship Company, launching her on 3 June 1909 and completing her on 11 September. She had twin screws driven by twin quadruple expansion engines. Between them the two engines developed a total of 823 NHP and gave Leicestershire a speed of 14 knots (26 km/h) or 15 knots (28 km/h).

As built, Leicestershire had capacity for 230 passengers, 1,629 cubic feet (46.1 m^{3}) of her hold space were refrigerated, and her tonnages were 8,299 GRT and 5,165 NRT.

Leicestershire had four masts. This was a distinctive feature of all Bibby Brothers ships built up until 1939.

A year later Harland and Wolff built a sister ship, Gloucestershire. She was launched on 7 July 1910 and completed on 22 October.

== UK service ==
Bibby Brothers ran passenger and cargo liner services between Liverpool, India and Burma. Leicestershire's maiden voyage was from Birkenhead to Rangoon.

By 1913 Leicestershire was equipped for wireless telegraphy. The Marconi Company operated her equipment on the standard 300 and 600 metre wavelengths. Her call sign was MYL.

In August 1914 Leicestershire was requisitioned as a troop ship. She brought the 17th Lancers from Bombay to Marseille, and then took part of Indian Expeditionary Force D, including Burmese troops, to the Persian Gulf. She was then returned to her owners.

On 11 October 1917 she accidentally rammed HMY Kethailes in the Irish Sea off the east coast of County Wexford, sinking the yacht and killing 17 of her crew.

In November 1917 Leicestershire was again requisitioned as a troop ship. She took 2,000 troops from Plymouth to Bombay. Between April and August 1918 she took 2,000 UK troops to Archangelsk as part of the North Russia intervention in the Russian Civil War and was one of several ships that brought US troops to Britain. In December 1918 she repatriated 3,000 Australian Army troops to Fremantle, Melbourne and Sydney.

After the First World War Leicestershire was returned to Bibby Brothers, who had her refitted to return to civilian service. She was converted from coal-burning to oil, which freed her coal bunker to be turned into more cargo space. In the 1920s she continued her service between Liverpool and Rangoon.

By 1930 Leicestershire's tonnages were 8,059 GRT and 5,034 NRT. That year the British National Exhibition Ship Company bought her, had her converted into an exhibition ship and renamed her British Exhibitor. Her new owners intended her to tour the British Empire promoting UK goods. In 1931 the exhibition opened on the River Thames but in 1932 the company went bankrupt.

== Egyptian service ==
The Egyptian Company for Travel and Navigation bought British Exhibitor on 28 September 1933. It renamed her Zamzam after the Zamzam Well at Mecca. She was converted to carry 600 Muslim pilgrims, and one of her holds was converted into a mosque. She carried pilgrims for at least two months each year.

In 1934 Zamzam passed to the Société Misr de Navigation, who registered her in Alexandria. Zamzam spent the remainder of the 1930s carrying pilgrims between Suez and Jeddah. Her UK code letters HPRD and original call sign were superseded by the Egyptian call sign SUBZ.

In September 1939, the Kingdom of Egypt severed diplomatic relations with the Axis powers but did not declare war. While Egypt was neutral, British military forces were based there and the country had limited autonomy. The UK ran military operations in the Mediterranean and Middle East theatre of World War II from Egypt, and held authority over Egyptian merchant ships. In both World Wars it requisitioned them at will.

In October 1939, a month after the Second World War began, Zamzam was laid up. A year later, on 28 October 1940, she was in Alexandria Port during a Regia Aeronautica air raid. Fragments from one Italian bomb damaged her forecastle. She was repaired and returned to service. She had an Egyptian crew commanded by UK officers.

In December 1940 Zamzam took 99 passengers and a cargo of cotton from Alexandria to the USA via the Suez Canal, Indian Ocean, Cape Town, South Atlantic and North Atlantic. On 24 February 1941 she landed her passengers at Jersey City. She then continued to Boston.

=== Final voyage ===
In March 1941 Zamzam's return voyage to Egypt was delayed when a stevedore claimed he had suffered a skull fracture while working aboard her. She was held at Hoboken for several days, until her owners deposited a $50,000 bond.

On 20 March Zamzam left Jersey City to return to Alexandria. She carried about 140 crew and about 200 passengers, but sources differ as to the exact number of each. Most of her crew were Egyptian, but they included also Sudanese, Greeks, Yugoslavs, Britons, one French national and a Czechoslovak. 137 of the passengers were Christian missionaries of various denominations and boards: Lutheran, Assemblies of God, African Inland Mission, Brethren, Congo Inland Mission, Disciples of Christ, Baptists) or their wives and children. Another 24 were volunteer ambulance drivers of the British American Ambulance Corps on their way to serve in North Africa with the Free French forces.

One missionary wife, Lillian Danielson, found that the lifejackets in her cabin were in poor condition and were too large to fit her six children, whose ages at the time ranged from one to 10. She repaired them and altered them to fit.

Zamzam called at Baltimore on 22–23 March and Trinidad on 30 March. Her Master, William Gray Smith, sought permission for her to sail fully lit as a neutral ship. The UK Admiralty refused, ordered him to sail blacked out and told him to follow a pre-arranged course.

Zamzam called at Recife, where passengers joined the ship including Fortune reporter Charles Murphy and Life photographer David Scherman. By the time she left Recife, Zamzam had 202 passengers. According to Murphy they included 73 women, 35 children and 138 of the total were US nationals. Six were tobacco buyers from Wilson, North Carolina travelling on business to Southern Rhodesia. There were also 26 Canadians, 25 UK nationals, five South Africans, four Belgians, two Greek nurses, an Italian and a Norwegian.

Zamzam carried 5,344 tons of cargo. It included 20 ambulances for the Free French forces in North Africa, an x-ray trailer, a field kitchen, 2,322 tons of lubricating and other oils, 1,000 tons of fertilizer, plus foods, tobacco products and manufactured goods. The ambulance corps' vehicles and other equipment aboard were worth nearly $100,000. Murphy wrote that the cargo's total value was $3 million.

On 9 April Zamzam left Recife to cross the South Atlantic to South Africa. She was due to reach Cape Town on 21 April. On 14 April she changed course. Captain Gray stated that this was because her wireless operator received a distress message from a Norwegian merchant ship, the Tai-Yin, that was under attack by a German raider.

=== Attack ===
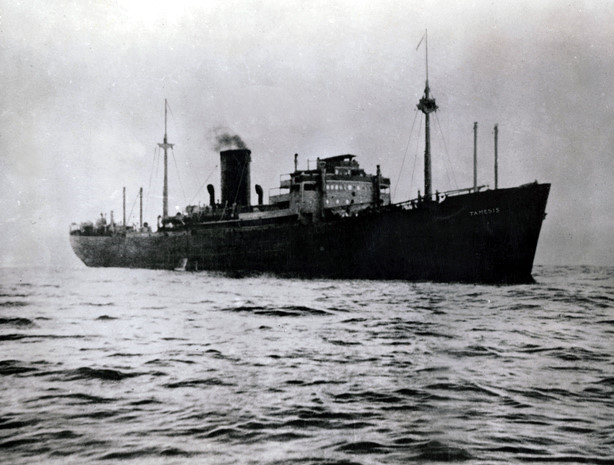
The German raider Atlantis

At about 0555 hrs on 17 April the German auxiliary cruiser Atlantis opened fire on Zamzam from a range of about 3.5 nautical miles (6 km). Nine 150 mm shells hit Zamzam' port side, injuring several passengers and crew, including the ship's doctor. Zamzam's engine room was holed below the waterline, causing her to list to port. Her wireless aerials were destroyed, and there was damage to her passenger accommodation, Master's quarters, and funnel. Atlantis ceased firing after about 10 minutes.

Nearly all of Zamzam's passengers and crew abandoned ship, but shellfire had destroyed one lifeboat and damaged two others. The damaged boats were swamped shortly after being launched, including that carrying Mrs Danielson and her children, all of whom ended up in the water. Some passengers jumped from Zamzam into the sea. The ambulance drivers looked after women and children, treated the wounded, and pulled people out of the sea into the boats and liferafts.

When all the boats and rafts had been launched, Captain Smith was left on his ship with his Chief Officer, his Chief Engineer, six ambulance drivers, and a four-year-old girl who had become separated from her parents.

=== Rescue ===
Atlantis rescued all survivors from the boats, from the water, and the group left on Zamzam. Atlantis' Captain, Bernhard Rogge, sent a boarding party aboard Zamzam that searched her chartroom and Master's quarters, removed supplies and personal possessions. At about 1400 hrs the boarding party scuttled Zamzam with three explosive charges.

Scherman was in lifeboat number one. He photographed Zamzam being abandoned, and after he reached Atlantis, a German officer encouraged him to photograph Zamzam being scuttled. Atlantis' crew confiscated some of his films, but he managed to keep four rolls hidden.

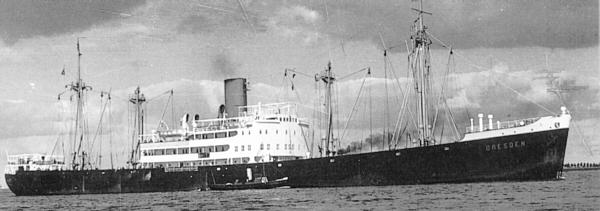
Dresden in 1937

The next day Atlantis met her supply ship, Dresden, to whom all Zamzam's survivors and their luggage were transferred except three who were too seriously wounded. Atlantis and Dresden parted, but they met again on 28 April. A delegation of survivors met Rogge on Atlantis and asked for more food to be transferred to Dresden, and for the US and other neutral survivors to be put ashore in South America to avoid the danger Dresden would face when running the Royal Navy blockade to reach Europe.

After conferring with his officers, Rogge said Dresden would look for a neutral ship to which to transfer survivors. Failing that, Dresden would approach the Brazilian coast and try to find a Brazilian coaster to take them. Only as a last resort would Dresden enter a neutral port to put survivors ashore. With that, Atlantis and Dresden parted again.

The next day one of the wounded, tobacco merchant Ned Laughinghouse, died aboard Atlantis. He had suffered a shrapnel wound to the skull during the shelling.

=== Dresden's voyage to France ===
Dresden carried the survivors in her cargo holds, separated into three groups. Women and children formed one group, and were put up in the Dresdens small passenger cabins, while the officers and male passengers formed another and had to sleep in the ships holds, and the mostly Egyptian crew formed the third. Food remained short, and only slightly improved. Dysentery was rife. Dresden did not try to find a neutral ship, but headed straight for Europe. As she sailed into more northern latitudes, influenza broke out. Scherman photographed conditions aboard.

The survivors would spend the next month at sea. They complained constantly about the food, which included a thin breakfast gruel they called "billboard paste" and a bad tasting soup for dinner they dubbed "glop". Dubbing themselves "The Wandering and Wondering Society", to pass the time they formed a small band and swam in the ships small swimming pool until they reached the chilly north Atlantic. After reaching colder latitudes, they played chess, backgammon and other board games and endlessly debated where their final destination would be.

On 18 May Zamzam was reported missing. the UK Ministry of Information said she must be "presumed lost", but naval authorities in Cape Town insisted she was merely "overdue".

On 20 May Dresden landed survivors at Saint-Jean-de-Luz in German-occupied France. The USA was still neutral so its citizens were taken to Biarritz, where there was a US consul. Civilians of Allied nations were interned, initially in Bordeaux and then at various camps in German-occupied Europe.

On 21 May the Deutsches Nachrichtenbüro ("German News Office" or DNB) admitted the Kriegsmarine had sunk Zamzam and confirmed that its passengers and crew were in occupied France. The DNB said the sinking was justified because her cargo included materials for the UK war effort. Her cargo included 64 different types of goods, 33 of which Germany listed as contraband. This included the vehicles, spare parts and lubricating oil.

On 22 May, Egypt formally protested to Germany about Zamzam's sinking, calling it a violation of international law. Egypt sought the repatriation of the Egyptian crew. As Egypt had severed diplomatic relations with Germany in 1939, the Swedish legation in Berlin presented the protest.

On 26 May, Germany said it would release all US women and children, and those US men whom it called "genuine" missionaries. On 28 May the US survivors in Biarritz were reported to be well-treated and free to move about the town.

=== Early repatriations ===
On 29 May, Germany was reported to have granted exit visas to the US survivors. However, the report did not specify whether the ambulance drivers were included. On 31 May the Germans released 119 US passengers at Hendaye on the French frontier with Spain to staff from the US Embassy in Madrid. On 1 June they entered Portugal from the Spanish border town of Fuentes de Oñoro, and on 2 June they reached Sintra to await repatriation. Also on 2 June, Life published news about Zamzam.

The ambulance drivers were not released. They were young men of combat age, many US individuals had voluntarily joined the UK and Canadian Armed Forces, the British American Ambulance Corps had strong sympathies to the UK, and at least one of them had served as an ambulance driver in the Battle of France. German authorities claimed they were concerned that the ambulance drivers could reveal German military secrets to the UK authorities.

On 9 June Murphy, Scherman and a representative of the Ambulance Corps flew home from Portugal on a Pan American Clipper via Horta and Bermuda to LaGuardia Airport, New York. The remainder of the US passengers returned by sea on various US and Portuguese ships, most of them reaching US ports between 21 and 30 June. 26 women missionaries from Zamzam left Lisbon on 10 June aboard Mouzinho, which reached Staten Island on 21 June. 29 survivors followed aboard Serpa Pinto, which reached Staten Island on 23 June. The largest group was of 53 survivors who sailed from Lisbon on the American Export Lines ship Exeter, which reached New York on 24 June.

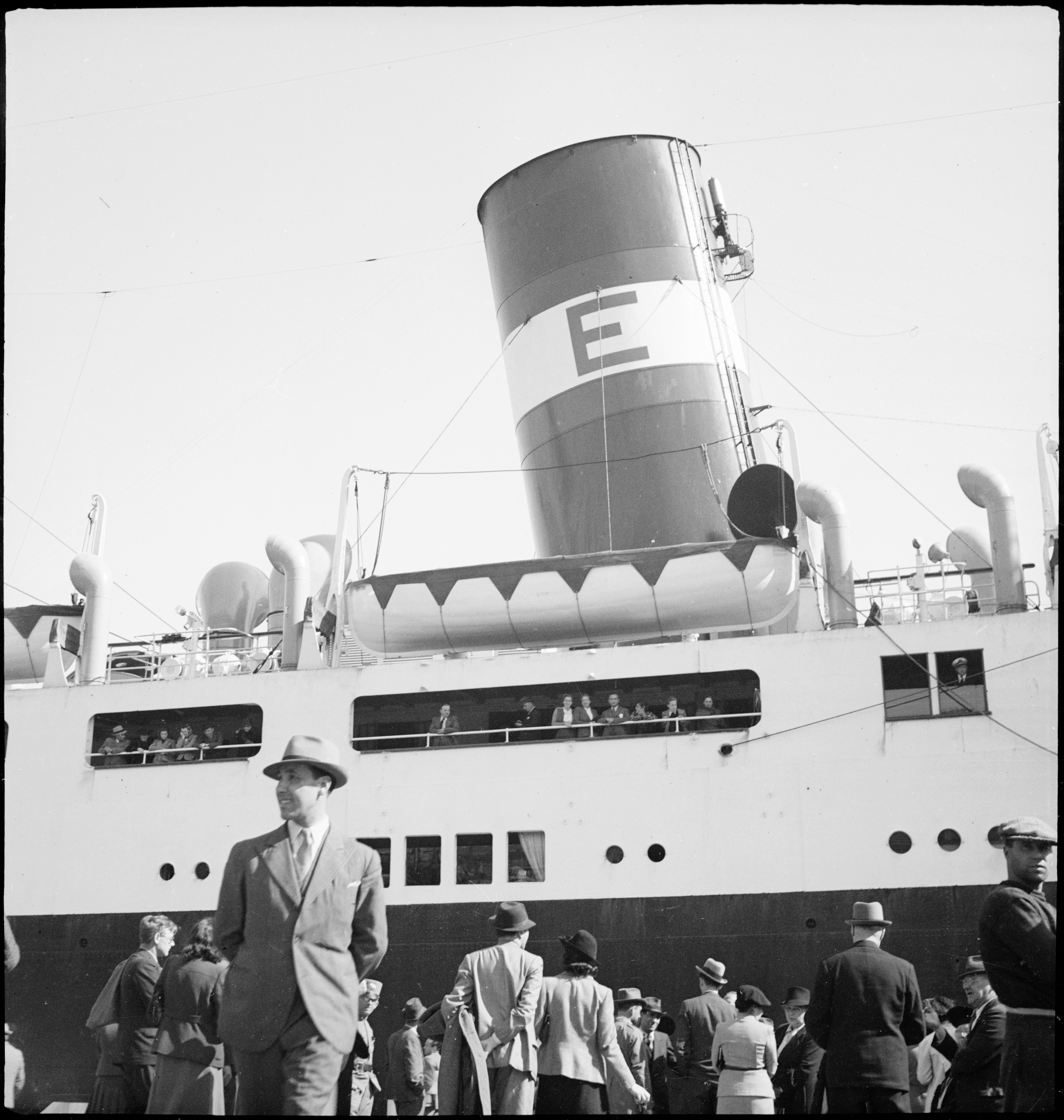
An American Export Lines ship in Lisbon in May 1941

On 23 June Life published an extensive article about Atlantis sinking Zamzam and Dresden taking survivors to France. Murphy wrote the article, and Scherman's smuggled photographs illustrated it.

Two of the ambulancemen escaped internment in France, travelled to Portugal, and on 28 July reached New York aboard the American Export Lines ship Excalibur.

In July 1941 the US Government sent the troop ship USS West Point to Lisbon carrying German and Italian consular personnel, to be exchanged for US consular personnel from German and Italian territories. The Germans released the remaining ambulance drivers whom Dresden had landed in France; they sailed home on West Point's return voyage from Lisbon and reached New York on 2 August.

=== Atlantis sunk ===
On 9 August Germany admitted that two of Zamzam's wounded survivors were still aboard the raider which sank her. The report used Atlantis's false name Tamesis and did not disclose her true identity.

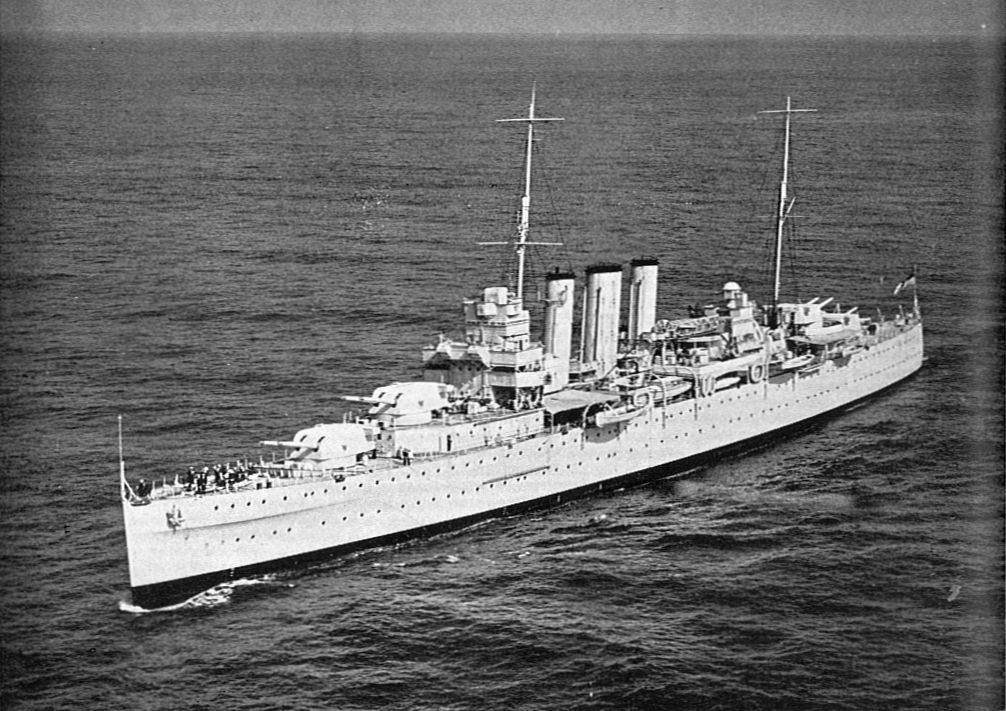
HMS Devonshire, which sank Atlantis

UK reconnaissance aircraft used Scherman's photographs to identify Atlantis, and the cruiser HMS Devonshire sank her on 21 November 1941. The German censor had released the photographs Scherman took aboard Dresden, and on 15 December Life published them in an article.

The two wounded survivors, Robert Starling from the UK and US ambulanceman Frank Vicovari, were still aboard Atlantis when Devonshire sank her. At least 317 crew and prisoners abandoned ship in liferafts or boats (sources vary as to which). The German submarine U-126 surfaced, took aboard 107 of the survivors and started to tow the rafts or boats toward neutral Brazil.

Two days later U-126 met the German supply ship Python, transferred survivors to her and started to refuel from the supply ship, but the cruiser HMS Dorsetshire appeared and opened fire. U-126 submerged and Python's crew scuttled their own ship. Two submarines, U-68 and UA, rescued 414 survivors. Between 3 and 18 December other German and Italian submarines relieved U-68 and UA of many of the survivors, and they were all landed in Saint-Nazaire between 23 and 29 December.

In this way Vicovari, and presumably Starling, reached German-occupied France, but only after the Japanese attack on Pearl Harbor on 7 December and US declaration of war on Germany four days later. Therefore Vicovari was interned as an enemy alien.

=== Later repatriations ===
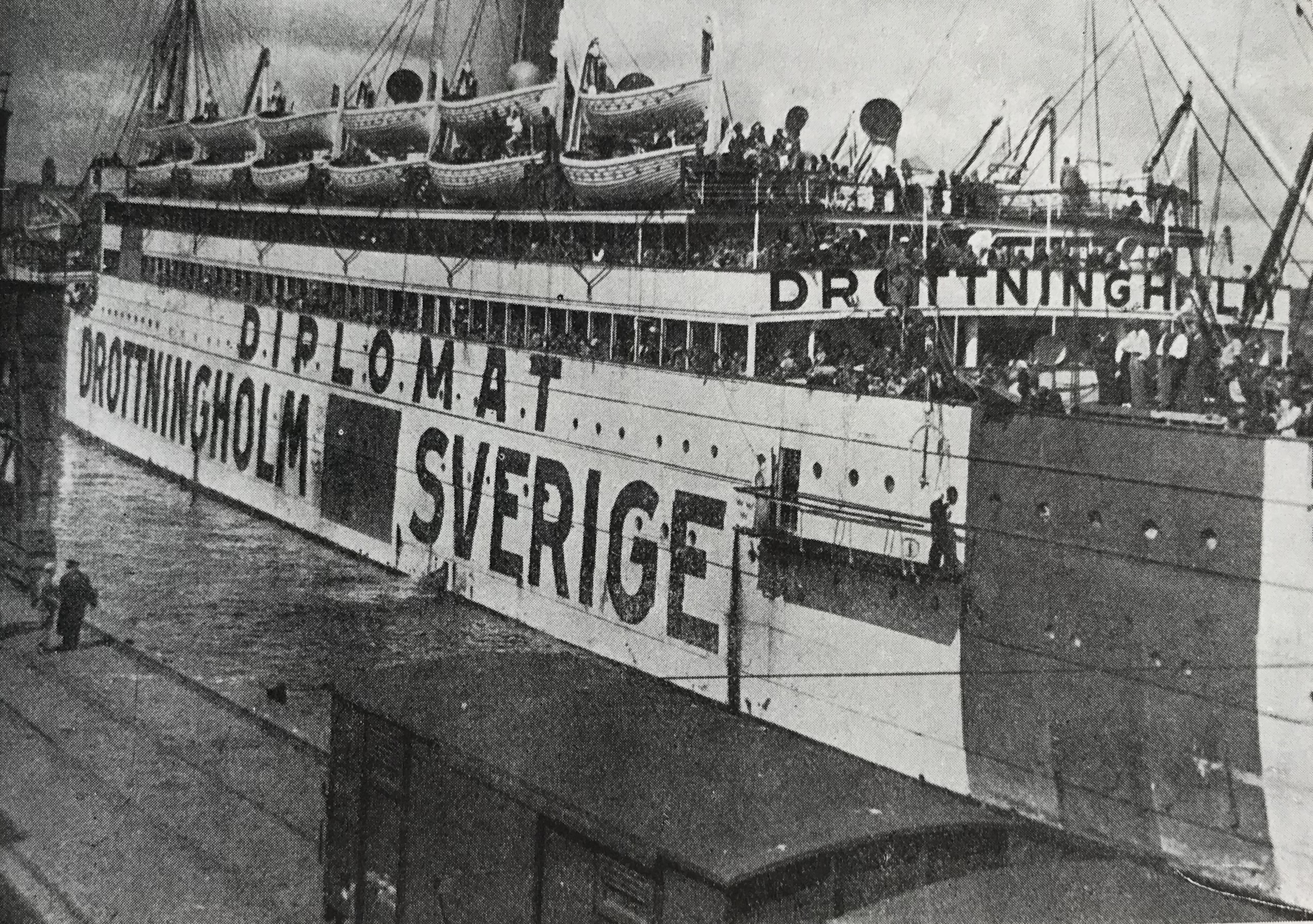
The Swedish liner Drottningholm, which brought 10 Canadian survivors from Lisbon to Jersey City

In June 1942 ten Canadian women passengers from Zamzam sailed from Lisbon to Jersey City on the Swedish liner Drottningholm, which the US Department of State and US Maritime Commission had chartered to exchange interned civilians from both sides. The women had been interned in Liebenau internment camp in Württemberg.

Vicovari was interned in a camp near Bremen with Royal Navy and UK Merchant Navy seafarers. On 25 February 1944 the German authorities released him in an exchange of detainees. He sailed home on the chartered Swedish liner Gripsholm. Vicovari confirmed that the raider's true name was Atlantis.

104 Egyptian crew were held in an internment camp in Bulgaria, and were liberated after Bulgaria's Axis government was overthrown in September 1944 and Bulgaria signed an armistice with the Allies in October. In 1945 a reporter for The New York Times found many of the crew living in a small town in Yugoslavia.

The last Zamzam survivor to be liberated was probably Walter Guilding, who was interned in a camp in Westertimke in north Germany. He was freed on 27 April 1945 when a British Army unit occupied the area.

== Lawsuit ==
Several of Zamzam's passengers were missionaries for the Africa Inland Mission. AIM sued the Alexandria Navigation Company, the travel agent Thomas Cook & Son, and Compagnie Internationale des Wagons-Lits, which until 1942 owned Thomas Cook. The suit alleged negligence and claimed $24,448.79 damages. On 20 March 1947 the New York Supreme Court dismissed the suit.

On 23 December 1947 the New York Supreme Court Appellate Division granted an appeal. On about 27 May 1948 the parties agreed an out of court settlement for half of the claim.

== See also ==
- Abukir and Khedive Ismail: Egyptian ships requisitioned by the UK government and sunk by enemy action

== Bibliography ==
- Dowling, R (1909) [1903]. All About Ships & Shipping (2nd ed.). London: Alexander Moring Ltd.
- Harnack, Edwin P (1930) [1903]. All About Ships & Shipping (3rd ed.). London: Faber and Faber.
- The Marconi Press Agency Ltd (1913). The Year Book of Wireless Telegraphy and Telephony. London: The St Katherine Press.
- The Marconi Press Agency Ltd (1914). The Year Book of Wireless Telegraphy and Telephony. London: The Marconi Press Agency Ltd.
- Murphy, Charles JV (23 June 1941). "The Sinking of the "Zamzam"". Life. pp. 21–27, 70–74, 77–79.
- Wilson, RM (1956). The Big Ships. London: Cassell & Co.
