= List of fellows of the Royal Society elected in 1931 =

This is a list of people elected Fellow of the Royal Society in 1931.

== Fellows ==
- Percy George Hamnall Boswell
- Vishnu Vasudev Narlikar
- Alfred Joseph Clark
- Charles Rundle Davidson
- Reginald Ruggles Gates
- Charles Stanley Gibson
- Hermann Glauert
- Sir Charles Robert Harington
- Sir Ian Morris Heilbron
- Sir Alexander Cruikshank Houston
- Sydney Price James
- Charles Frewen Jenkin
- Stanley Wells Kemp
- Thomas Howell Laby
- William Kingdon Spencer
- Edward Charles Titchmarsh
- Wilfred Batten Lewis Trotter
- Miles Walker

== Foreign members ==
- Marie Paul Auguste Charles Fabry
- Emmanuel Marie Pierre Martin Jacquin de Margerie
- Heinrich Otto Wieland
