= Richard Alan Morton =

British academic biochemist

FRS Richard Alan Morton
- Born: September 22, 1899; Garston, Liverpool, UK
- Died: January 21, 1977 (aged 77); Allerton, Liverpool, UK
- Education: University of Liverpool
- Spouse: Myfanwy Heulwen Roberts
- Scientific career
- Fields: spectroscopy
- Workplaces: University of Liverpool
- Doctoral advisors: Edward Charles Cyril Baly

Richard Alan Morton FRS was the Johnston Professor of Biochemistry at University of Liverpool from 1944 until 1966. He was a pioneer in the application of spectroscopy to biological molecules. His research group were the first to identify vitamin A_{2} and related compounds. They were also among the first to characterise several isoprenoids including ubiquinone, polyprenol and others.

== Early life and education ==
Richard Alan Morton was the child of Welsh-speaking parents in Liverpool. His middle name was initially Alun. He attended the co-educational Oulton Secondary School in Liverpool. He left school in 1917 to work in a pharmacy and then joined the army towards the end of the First World War. He became ill with Spanish flu. From 1919 he studied chemistry at the University of Liverpool, graduating with B. Sc. first class in 1922. He then undertook doctoral research supervised by Edward Charles Cyril Baly into the application of optical spectroscopy. Selig Hecht was a post-doctoral fellow with Baly's group at this time, interested in applications of spectroscopy in biology, and this developed Morton's interest in this new application.

== Career ==
He remained at this university for his entire career apart from spending 1931 on sabbatical as visiting professor at Ohio State University in the USA. From 1924 until 1944 he was a special lecturer in spectroscopy in the Chemistry Department. He was then appointed to the Johnston Chair of Biochemistry in the Department of Biochemistry in 1944 until he retired in 1966. He continued to be active in science after his retirement.

His research focused initially on the application of spectroscopy to determining the structure of chemical compounds. From 1926 his work developed the use of absorption spectroscopy with biological molecules that absorbed light, allowing their concentration to be estimated in solutions. This technology, in collaboration with Ian Heilbron's interest in a therapy for rickets, led him to discover the vitamin A_{2} and several related compounds. His research group became focused on fat-soluble vitamins and was also among the first to identify ubiquinone and the polyprenol family of compounds. From 1955 until 1965 the focus of his group's research was isoprenoids.

During the Second World War he was involved in studies to understand the requirements of vitamin A by people that gave him a new interest in nutrition. After the war he organised meetings for industrial scientists around Merseyside about the use of spectroscopy

He was the chair of the government's Committee on Food Additives from 1963 to 1968.

== Publications ==
Morton was the author or co-author of 282 scientific publications and several books. These included:

- RA Morton (1975) Biochemical Spectroscopy, two volumes
- RA Morton (1969) The Biochemical Society: its history and activities 1911-1969
- R A Morton (1942) Absorption spectra of Vitamins and Hormones

He was also the author of publications in Welsh including:

- (1965) Agweddau cemegol ar weled (Chemical aspects of sight) Y Gwyddonydd 3 issue 2

== Honours and awards ==
In 1929 he was awarded the Meldola Medal and Prize by the Chemical Society. In 1950 he was elected a Fellow of the Royal Society. In 1969 he was elected a member of the American Society for Nutrition. In 1966 he was made an Honorary Member of the Biochemical Society. In 1971 the University of Liverpool named a new student hostel Morton House after him. He was awarded honorary degrees by the University of Wales (1966), Trinity College Dublin (1967) and the University of Coimbra (1964). In 1978 the Biochemical Society established the annual Morton Lecture in his memory for contribution to lipid biochemistry.

== Personal life ==
In 1926 he and Myfanwy Heulwen Roberts were married. They had one child together. He attended the Welsh Presbyterian Chapel in Garston and was involved with the Welsh community in Liverpool throughout his life.
