= William Cramer (pathologist) =

British pathologist (1878–1945)

- Born: 2 June 1878; Germany
- Died: 10 August 1945 (aged 67); Denver, Colorado
- Education: Ludwig-Maximilians-Universität München
- Known for: Pathologist at the Imperial Cancer Research Fund
- Scientific career
- Fields: Pathologist
- Workplaces: University of Edinburgh; Imperial Cancer Research Fund; Washington University School of Medicine

William Cramer FRSE (2 June 1878, Germany – 10 August 1945, Denver, CO, US) was a British pathologist and physiologist, best known for his work with the Imperial Cancer Research Fund.

== Biography ==
William Cramer was born in Germany on 2 June 1878. He received his first tertiary education at the Ludwig-Maximilians-Universität München and received his Ph.D. at the Friedrich Wilhelm University of Berlin in 1901. He achieved his D.Sc. at the University of Edinburgh in 1908, during which time he had worked under Swale Vincent. Cramer took the English Conjoint qualification after nine years as a chemical physiology lecturer at Edinburgh. He had worked briefly for the Imperial Cancer Research Fund in 1904; he rejoined the organisation in 1914.

In 1907, he was elected a Fellow of the Royal Society of Edinburgh. His proposers were Sir Edward Albert Sharpey-Schafer, Francis H A Marshall, Alexander Crum Brown and James Cossar Ewart.

Shortly after the outbreak of World War I, Cramer became a naturalised British citizen. He was elected a Foreign Member of the German Society for the Investigation of Cancer. In 1933, he was an official British delegate at the International Cancer Congress in Madrid, and again in 1934 at the International Cancer Research conference in Paris. In 1939, after 25 years with the Imperial Cancer Research Fund, Cramer relocated to St. Louis, Missouri, where he was head pathologist at the Barnard Skin and Cancer Hospital, and a research associate at Washington University.

Throughout his career, Cramer authored numerous papers on cancer, physiology, and biochemistry. His textbook, Practical Course in Chemical Physiology, had reached its fourth edition by 1920. Cramer belonged to the Physiological Society, the Pathological Society, and the Biochemical Society.
