= Biochemical Society Transactions =

- Discipline: Biochemistry
- Language: English
- Edited by: James M. Murphy

Publication details
- History: 1973–present
- Publisher: Portland Press (United Kingdom)
- Frequency: Bimonthly
- Open access: Yes
- Impact factor: 4.4 (2025)

Standard abbreviations
- ISO 4: Biochem. Soc. Trans.

Indexing
- CODEN: BCSTB5
- ISSN: 0300-5127 (print); 1470-8752 (web)
- LCCN: 73643639
- OCLC no.: 615528526

Links
- Journal homepage; Online archive

Biochemical Society Transactions is a bimonthly peer-reviewed scientific journal which publishes the transactions of the annual conference and focused meetings of the Biochemical Society, together with independent meetings supported by the society. The society's annual symposium, previously published only in Biochemical Society Symposium, was first published in the Transactions in 2008. The journal was established in 1973 and is published by Portland Press, the Society's publishing arm.

The journal was issued quarterly until 1999. Since 2004, issues have been made up entirely of full papers, having previously alternated between an issue of abstracts and an issue of full papers. Transactions take the form of short papers, usually of 3–4 pages; the journal also publishes longer papers from the society's award lectures.

For the first 31 years Biochemical Society Transactions was led by Managing Editors with the first honorary editor being David J. Richardson (University of East Anglia) who was appointed in 2005. Colin Bingle succeeded David Richardson in 2015 and was appointed as editor-in-chief in 2016.

The editor-in-chief in 2026 is Professor James M. Murphy. According to the Journal Citation Reports, the journal had a 2025 impact factor of 4.4 with a 5-year impact factor from 2020-2025 of 4.6.
