= Elisabeth Dane =

German biochemist

- Born: 9 January 1903; Mayen, German Empire
- Died: 12 March 1984 (aged 81); Munich, Germany
- Education: University of Freiburg; Ludwig-Maximilians-Universität München; Friedrich Wilhelm University of Berlin (Ph.D.)
- Awards: Carl-Duisberg Memorial Award
- Scientific career
- Fields: Biochemistry
- Workplaces: Ludwig-Maximilians-Universität München

Elisabeth Dane (9 January 1903 – 12 March 1984) was a German biochemist.

== Life ==
Elisabeth Dane was born on 9 January 1903 in Mayen, German Empire. She graduated from gymnasium in Munich in 1923. She attended the University of Freiburg, the Ludwig-Maximilians-Universität München, and the Friedrich Wilhelm University of Berlin before earning her Ph.D. in chemistry from the Friedrich Wilhelm University of Berlin. That same year she became assistant to the Nobel Laureate, Heinrich Otto Wieland. Dane qualified as a Privatdozentin in 1934 and began to direct the chemical practicum and seminar for medical scientists in 1939. She was appointed as an adjunct professor in 1941 despite not being a member of the Nazi Party. The following year she was appointed professor and conservator-restorer (German: Konservator). She died in Munich on 12 March 1984.

== Activities ==
Dane's dissertation was on the composition of the alkaloids in Lobelia inflata and a shortened version was published that same year in the journal Liebigs Annalen der Chemie. Working with Wieland, she researched the structure and composition of steroids and later worked on the constitution of bile. "With the aid of a cycloaddition, the Diels-Alder reaction, she was able to synthesize the tetracyclical system of steroids. In 1938, she was awarded the Carl-Duisberg prize for the work on female sexual organs that she published with J. Schmitt."
