= Biochemical Journal =

- Discipline: Biochemistry
- Language: English
- Edited by: Mark A. Lemmon

Publication details
- Former name: The Bio-Chemical Journal
- History: 1906–present
- Publisher: Portland Press
- Frequency: 24/year
- Open access: After 12 months/hybrid
- Impact factor: 4.097 (2019)

Standard abbreviations
- ISO 4: Biochem. J.

Indexing
- CODEN: BIJOAK
- ISSN: 0264-6021 (print); 1470-8728 (web)
- LCCN: 26011128
- OCLC no.: 01532962

Links
- Journal homepage; Online archive

The Biochemical Journal is a peer-reviewed scientific journal which covers all aspects of biochemistry, as well as cell and molecular biology. It is published by Portland Press and was established in 1906.

== History ==
The journal was established in 1906 by Benjamin Moore, holder of the first UK chair of biochemistry at the University of Liverpool, with financial support from Edward Whitley, an heir of the Greenall Whitley brewers. The two served as the first editors and the journal was initially published by the Liverpool University Press. It was acquired by the Biochemical Club (later renamed the Biochemical Society) in October 1912, shortly after the society's foundation; at that time the journal had 170 subscribers. From 1913, it was published in conjunction with Cambridge University Press, with William Bayliss and Arthur Harden chairing the editorial board; the original title of The Bio-Chemical Journal became The Biochemical Journal at that date.

The journal at first appeared at irregular intervals, with between three and twelve issues appearing annually in a single volume. From 1948, two volumes were published annually, with four or five parts per volume, and the frequency increased rapidly over the years, reaching the current frequency of eight volumes in three parts in 1974.

== Current journal ==
Eight volumes are published each year with each volume consisting of three parts (24 issues per year).

To mark the centenary of the journal in 2006, a free online archive back to the journal's first issue in 1906 was launched. All papers are available as pdfs, and recent papers are also available in a proprietary format called Enhanced Electronic Serials Interface-View (EESI-View). The journal won the first Charlesworth Award of the Association of Learned and Professional Society Publishers (ALPSP) for Best Online Journal in 2007. The judges described the online journal as '"visually attractive and easy to use ... maintains the character of the journal while exploiting the digital medium to offer a range of additional features".

Towards the end of 2009, the journal launched a new technological innovation: the Semantic Biochemical Journal. The software used, Utopia Documents, transforms the content of the journal by dynamically linking documents to research data, enabling readers to interact with and manipulate the information in the journal's scientific papers more effectively. The software turns static images, tables, and text into objects that can be linked, annotated, visualized, and analysed interactively.

== Highly-cited papers ==
The journal has published many highly cited papers. There are more than 100 that have been cited more than 1000 times each, and the following have been cited more than 5000 times each:

- Burton, K. (1956). "A study of the conditions and mechanism of the diphenylamine reaction for the colorimetric estimation of deoxyribonucleic acid". Biochemical Journal. 62 (2): 315–323. doi:10.1042/bj0620315. PMC 1215910. PMID 13293190. (cited more than 17,000 times)
- Greenwood, FC; Hunter, WM; Glover, JS (1963). "The Preparation of 131I-Labelled Human Growth Hormone of High Specific Radioactivity". Biochemical Journal. 89 (1): 114–123. doi:10.1042/bj0890114. PMC 1202279. PMID 14097352. (cited more than 10,000 times)
- Nash, T. (1953). "The colorimetric estimation of formaldehyde by means of the Hantzsch reaction". Biochemical Journal. 55 (3): 416–421. doi:10.1042/bj0550416. PMC 1269292. PMID 13105648.

== Abstracting and indexing ==
The journal is abstracted and indexed in Elsevier Biobase, BIOSIS Previews, CAB International, Chemical Abstracts Service, Current Contents, Embase, International Food Information Service, MEDLINE/Index Medicus, ProQuest databases, and the Science Citation Index.

According to the Journal Citation Reports, the journal has a 2019 impact factor of 4.097.
