= Muriel St. Clare Byrne =

British historical researcher (1895–1983)

Muriel St. Clare Byrne OBE (1895–1983) was an English historical researcher, specialising in the Tudor period and the reign of Henry VIII.

== Family ==
Born Hoylake, Cheshire, England 31 May 1895, she was the granddaughter of the naval architect and yacht designer St Clare John Byrne with whom she and her mother lived when her father (Henry) died in 1905. Her mother was Artemisia Desdemona Burtner (1868–1923) from Muscatine, Iowa, USA.

Her life partner was Marjorie 'Bar' Barber, and she was also lovers with Mary Aeldrin Cullis.

== Education ==
Belvedere School, Liverpool; Somerville College, Oxford, B.A. 1916, M.A 1920. Oxford did not grant degrees to women until 1920, but she would have completed the academic requirements in 1916.

== Career ==
She was assistant tutor in English at Somerville College in 1919 and lecturer at the Army Education School, Rouen, France, 1918–19. She then taught at Morley College and the University of London. From 1920 to 1925 she served as coach for final honours at Oxford and from 1920 to 1927 she lectured at Oxford's University Extension in London. She held a lectureship at the Royal Academy of Dramatic Art, London, specialising in Elizabethan theatre and eventually became a governor of the Royal Shakespeare Theatre.

== Published works ==
Byrne devoted a lifetime to the study of Tudor England, gathered together and edited primary sources and published these, including the Lisle Letters, and the Letters and Papers of the Reign of Henry VIII, as well as publishing books which were entirely her own work, such as Elizabethan Life in Town and Country, Elizabethan Home and Common or Garden Child. A not-unfaithful record.

The Lisle letters are the correspondence of Arthur Plantagenet, 1st Viscount Lisle, consisting of 3000 letters. These were seized on the orders of Henry VIII when Lisle was accused of treason and sent to the Tower of London. They were discovered by Byrne in the London Public Record Office, neglected and largely undiscovered down the centuries. She felt these works, that detailed an important period in the reign of Henry VIII, should be made available to the public. However, the difficulties with deciphering the handwriting and the inconsistent spelling, resulted in Byrne spending almost 50 years producing the six volumes of her work. It has been described as the masterpiece of Byrne's career, woven together by her commentary. It required donations from many people including Queen Elizabeth II, to get the work published in 1981 on Byrne's 86th birthday.

A friend of Dorothy L. Sayers from their days at Somerville, she co-wrote the play upon which Sayers's novel Busman's Honeymoon was later based. She was credited within the book as one of the contributors to material published as The Wimsey Family by Wilfrid Scott-Giles, a mock-history of the Wimsey family.

She died 2 December 1983 and was buried in Marylebone Cemetery, London.

She left a collection of her papers, correspondence and photographs to Somerville College Library.
