= Clinical Science (journal) =

Peer-reviewed medical journal

- Discipline: Medicine
- Language: English
- Edited by: Rhian M. Touyz

Publication details
- Former names: Heart: A Journal for the Study of the Circulation, Clinical Science and Molecular Medicine
- History: 1909–present
- Publisher: Portland Press for the Biochemical Society (United Kingdom)
- Frequency: Biweekly
- Open access: After 12 months
- Impact factor: 5.220 (2017)

Standard abbreviations
- ISO 4: Clin. Sci.
- NLM: Clin Sci (Lond)

Indexing
- CODEN: CSCIAE
- ISSN: 0143-5221 (print); 1470-8736 (web)
- OCLC no.: 04596879

Links
- Journal homepage; Online archive

Clinical Science is a peer-reviewed medical journal that covers all areas of clinical investigation, with a focus on translational science and medicine. The journal is currently published biweekly by Portland Press on behalf of the Biochemical Society.

== History ==
The journal was established in 1909 by Thomas Lewis and James Mackenzie under the title Heart: A Journal for the Study of the Circulation. Lewis was the first editor-in-chief. In 1933, Lewis renamed the journal Clinical Science (ISSN 0009-9287; 1933–1973), his interests having broadened. It was briefly retitled Clinical Science and Molecular Medicine (ISSN 0301-0538; 1973–1978), becoming Clinical Science again in 1979.

The journal was published by the Medical Research Society (founded by Lewis in 1930) from 1945 until 1961, and then jointly by the Medical Research Society and the Biochemical Society until 2003, when the latter became the sole publisher. It was formerly published by Blackwell Science.

== Modern journal ==
Clinical Science is published monthly in print, in two volumes; from 2007, it has appeared in 24 online issues annually. Content from 1998 is available online in PDF and HTML formats, with papers from 2005 also being available in an enhanced full-text format. Papers are currently available free 12 months after the version of record is published online.

As of 2012, its editor-in-chief is Rhian M. Touyz (University of Glasgow).

== Abstracting and indexing ==
Clinical Science is abstracted and indexed by BIOBASE, BIOSIS, CAB International, Chemical Abstracts Service, Current Contents, EMBASE, MEDLINE/Index Medicus, and the Science Citation Index. According to the Journal Citation Reports, the journal has a 2017 impact factor of 5.220, ranking it 17th out of 133 journals in the category "Medicine, Research & Experimental".
