= Thompson Yates and Johnston Laboratories Report =

The Thompson Yates and Johnston Laboratories Report was a journal detailing the research performed by the Thompson Yates Laboratories and the Johnston Laboratories at the University of Liverpool in Liverpool, England. Previous to the founding of the Johnston Laboratories in 1903 it was simply entitled Thompson Yates Laboratories Report. It was published by the University of Liverpool Press.
