= Portland Press =

- Parent company: The Biochemical Society
- Country of origin: United Kingdom
- Headquarters location: London, London
- Publication types: journals, books, and magazines
- Official website: www.portlandpresspublishing.com

Portland Press Limited is the wholly owned publishing subsidiary of The Biochemical Society. It is a publisher of journals and books in the cellular and molecular life sciences. The surplus from the sales of its publications are returned to the scientific community via the activities of The Biochemical Society.

Portland Press publishes books, a magazine, The Biochemist, and several print and online academic journals:

- Biochemical Journal
- Biochemical Society Symposium (online only)
- Biochemical Society Transactions
- Bioscience Reports
- Cell Signalling Biology
- Clinical Science
- Essays in Biochemistry
- Neuronal Signaling
