= Heinrich Otto Wieland =

German Nobel laureate in Chemistry (1877–1957)

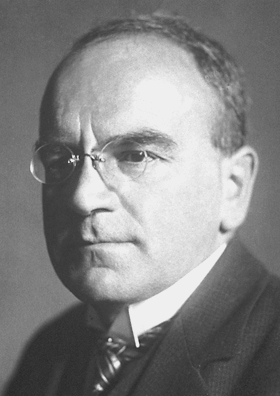
- Heinrich Otto Wieland
- Born: 4 June 1877; Pforzheim, Baden, Germany
- Died: 5 August 1957 (aged 80); Starnberg, Bavaria, West Germany
- Education: Ludwig-Maximilians-Universität München
- Known for: Adamsite; Bile acids research Barbier–Wieland degradation Wieland-Gumlich aldehyde Wieland rearrangement Wieland test
- Awards: Otto Hahn Prize for Chemistry and Physics (1955); Pour le Mérite for Sciences and Arts (1952); Goethe Medal (1942); ForMemRS (1931); Nobel Prize for Chemistry (1927)
- Scientific career
- Fields: Chemistry
- Workplaces: Technical University of Munich 1913–1921, University of Freiburg 1921–25, Ludwig-Maximilians-Universität München 1925–
- Doctoral advisor: Johannes Thiele
- Doctoral students: Rolf Huisgen, Leopold Horner

Heinrich Otto Wieland (German pronunciation: [ˈhaɪnʁɪç ˈviːlant]; 4 June 1877 – 5 August 1957) was a German chemist. He won the 1927 Nobel Prize in Chemistry for his research into the bile acids.

== Career ==
In 1901, Wieland received his doctorate at the Ludwig-Maximilians-Universität München while studying under Johannes Thiele. In 1904 he completed his habilitation, then continued to teach at the university and starting in 1907 was a consultant for Boehringer Ingelheim. In 1914, he became associate professor for special topics in organic chemistry, and director of the Organic Division of the State Laboratory in Munich. From 1917 to 1918, Wieland worked in the service of the (KWI) Kaiser Wilhelm Institute for Physical Chemistry and Electrochemistry in Dahlem then led by Fritz Haber as an alternative to regular military service. There he was involved in weapons research for instance finding new synthetic routes for mustard gas. He is also credited with the first synthesis of Adamsite.

From 1913 to 1921, he was Professor at the Technical University of Munich. He then moved to the University of Freiburg as successor of Ludwig Gattermann (he also assumed responsibility for Gattermann's famous cookbook). In Freiburg he started working on toad poisons and bile acids. In association with Boehringer Ingelheim he worked on synthetic alkaloids such as morphine and strychnine.

In 1925, Wieland succeeded Richard Willstätter as Chemistry Professor at the Ludwig-Maximilians-Universität München.

In 1941, Wieland isolated the toxin alpha-amanitin, the principal active agent of one of the world's most poisonous mushrooms Amanita phalloides.

Wieland tried successfully to protect people, especially Jewish students, who were "racially burdened" after the Nuremberg Laws. Students who were expelled because they were "racially burdened" could stay in Heinrich Wieland's group as chemists or as "Gäste des Geheimrats" (guests of the privy councillor). Hans Conrad Leipelt, a student of Wieland, was sentenced to death after collecting money for Kurt Huber's widow Clara Huber.

== Family ==
Heinrich's father, Theodor Wieland (1846–1928) was a pharmacist with a doctorate in chemistry. He owned a gold and silver refinery in Pforzheim. Heinrich Wieland was a cousin of Helene Boehringer, the wife of Albert Boehringer, who was the founder of the Boehringer Ingelheim pharmaceutical company. He worked for the company from 1915 to 1920 and established the company's scientific department.

Eva Wieland, Heinrich Wieland's daughter, was married to Feodor Lynen on 14 May 1937.

== Heinrich Wieland Prize ==
Since 1964, the Heinrich Wieland Prize has been awarded annually. First to promote research on chemistry, biochemistry, physiology and clinical medicine of lipids and related substances, nowadays the prize is awarded for outstanding research on biologically active molecules and systems in the fields of chemistry, biochemistry, and physiology as well as on their clinical importance. The prize is among the most treasured international science awards and has a successful history of over 50 years. The Heinrich Wieland Prize has been sponsored by Boehringer Ingelheim from 2000 to 2010. From 2011, it has been awarded by the Boehringer Ingelheim Foundation. The awardees have always been selected by an independent Board of Trustees. Since 2014, it has been endowed with 100,000 euros.

== See also ==
- Elisabeth Dane Wieland's assistant from 1929
