= Benjamin Moore (biochemist) =

Early British biochemist

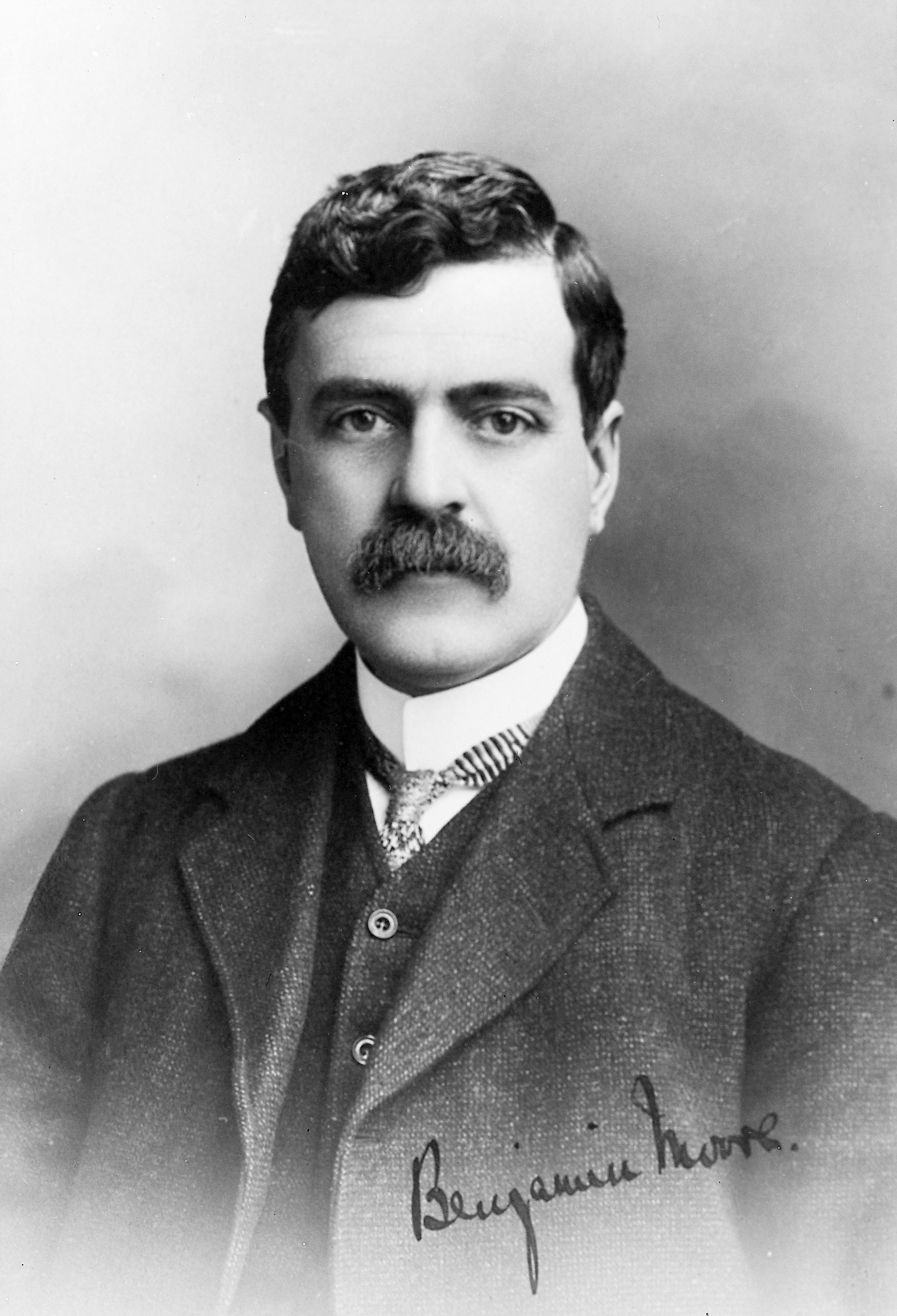
- Benjamin Moore (biochemist)
- Born: 14 January 1867
- Died: 3 March 1922 (aged 55)
- Education: Queen's College, Belfast; Royal University of Ireland
- Known for: Biochemical Journal
- Scientific career
- Fields: Biochemistry

Benjamin Moore, FRS (14 January 1867 – 3 March 1922) was an early British biochemist. He held the first chair of biochemistry in the UK, and founded the Biochemical Journal, one of the earliest academic journals in the subject.

== Education and career ==
Educated at Queen's College, Belfast and the Royal University of Ireland, Moore's early positions were in the field of physiology at Yale University, Connecticut, United States and Charing Cross Hospital, London. When the first British department of biochemistry was founded at the University of Liverpool in 1902, after a donation from Liverpool shipowner William Johnston, Moore took up the Johnston Chair, the first chair of biochemistry in the UK.

Moore is credited (in The SMA and the Foundation of the National Health Service) by Dr Leslie Hilliard with the first use of the words "National Health Service" and the foundation of the State Medical Service Association.

During the First World War, Moore worked for the Medical Research Council in London. In 1916-1917, together with Guy Alfred Wyon and T.A. Webster, he resolved the issue of potentially-fatal TNT poisoning in British shell factories, preventing further deaths. The poisonings and method of prevention were censored by the War Office until 1921 for the sake of public morale. Moore became a professor of biochemistry at the University of Oxford in 1920.

== Biochemistry in the UK ==
Moore was central to the early development of the field of biochemistry in the UK. He founded the Biochemical Journal in 1906, with financial assistance from his research assistant, Edward Whitley. Although the two sold the Biochemical Journal to the Biochemical Club (later the Biochemical Society) in 1912, Moore retained his interest in the new journal, remaining on the editorial committee until 1921 and publishing further papers in it.

In 1911, he was one of the founders of the Biochemical Society.

== Biotic energy ==
Moore for many years studied the molecular physics and structure of the organism, he came to reject mechanist and materialist explanations for the organism but also opposed idealistic and spiritualist explanations. Instead he developed a theory of "biotic energy" which he discussed in his books The Origin and Nature of Life (1913) and Biochemistry (1921). Similar to the vitalists he claimed that there was an energy in living bodies which could not be described in terms of physics and chemistry. John Burroughs was supportive of his biotic energy theory.

== Awards and honours ==
Moore was elected a fellow of the Royal Society in 1912.

== Personal life ==
He married and had three children, but was devastated when his wife died suddenly of appendicitis in 1913. His son Thomas Moore (1900–99) was a nutritional biochemist who became the first deputy director of the MRC Dunn Nutritional Laboratory.

Moore died from pneumonia in Oxford in 1922.

== Selected works ==
- Moore B, Eadie ES, Abram JH. (1906) On the treatment of diabetes mellitus by acid extract of duodenal mucous membrane. Bio-Chem J 1: 28–38
- Moore B (1911). The Dawn of the Health Age. London: J. & A. Churchill. ix+204 pages.
