= Edward Charles Cyril Baly =

British chemist 1871–1948

FRS Edward Charles Cyril Baly
- Born: February 9, 1871; London, UK
- Died: January 3, 1948 (aged 76)
- Education: University College, London
- Spouse: Ellen Agnes Jago
- Children: 4
- Scientific career
- Fields: spectroscopy
- Workplaces: University College, London; University of Liverpool
- Doctoral advisors: William Ramsay
- Notable students: Richard Alan Morton

Edward Charles Cyril Baly (1871 - 1948) FRS Chemist and spectroscopist, Grant Professor of Inorganic Chemistry at University of Liverpool 1910 - 1937. He was noted for pioneering research into applying optical spectroscopy to chemistry, especially to dynamic aspects of organic compounds.

== Early Life and education ==
Edward Charles Cyril Baly was born 9 February 1871 to Edward Ely Baly, a clerk at the Bank of England, and Alice Mary (ne Winterbottom). Later in his childhood his family lived in Threadneedle Street, after his father was promoted to deputy chief cashier. He attended Temple Grove School, East Sheen, then in 1885 he moved to Aldenham School near Elstree, where his education was financially supported by scholarships. In 1889, after his interests had focused on science at school, he began to study at University College London for professional qualifications and was awarded an Associateship of the Institute of Chemistry in 1892. During this time, Baly became skilled in glassblowing and constructing scientific apparatus. He applied these skills to study the spectra of gases.

== Career ==
After lecturing informally, in 1898 Baly was appointed as a lecturer to medical students in theoretical and practical chemistry, and given the title assistant professor three years later. His expertise in spectroscopy and designing equipment became recognised. From 1903 he had the title lecturer in spectroscopy and his own laboratory. His research, which had been on emission spectroscopy of gases alone, became re-focused onto absorption spectroscopy of organic compounds in visible and ultraviolet light and developing understanding of how to interpret the spectra for the structure and reactions of the compounds, especially coloured organic compounds.

He introduced the term isorropesis, for an explanation of light absorption based on oscillations in chemical structure. This was superseded as greater understanding of absorption spectroscopy developed. His interpretation moved on to a force-field theory and ideas of energy quanta during the early development of quantum theory. His attempts to explain the dynamic aspects of coloured organic compounds and their reactions was an important step, although he could not contribute to the quantitative theoretical physics needed for fuller understanding.

In 1910 Baly was appointed as Grant Professor of Inorganic Chemistry at University of Liverpool. He continued to work on absorption spectroscopy, moving into fluorescence and phosphorescence, and in the 1920s, into photochemistry. This developed into trying to understand the formation of carbohydrates from carbon dioxide in photosynthesis, which required light. He and his research collaborators used many inorganic compounds in this work attempting to create photosynthesis in a non-biological system, but the results were inconclusive and sometimes not reproducible.

During the First World War Baly was a Deputy Inspector of High Explosives for the North West, North Wales regions and Bristol, relevant to the production of munitions.

The chemistry department developed substantially during Baly's career at Liverpool, adding new buildings and a new established chair in organic chemistry. He held several positions within the British Association for the Advancement of Science, including being part of international visits where he lectured extensively. He retired in 1937.

== Publications ==
Baly was the author or co-author of around 109 scientific publications or books. These included:

- 1894. E.C.C. Baly and William Ramsay. Pressure, volume and temperature relations of rarefied gases. Phil. Mag. 38, 301.
- 1912. E.C.C. Baly and R. Krulla. A theory of fluorescence. Trans. Chem. Soc. 101, 1469.
- 1915. E.C.C. Baly. A theory of absorption, fluorescence and phosphorescence. Astrophys. J. 42, 4.
- 1924. E.C.C. Baly. Photosynthesis, Ind. Eng. Chem. 16, 1016.
- 1939. E.C.C. Baly. The photosynthesis of carbohydrates from hydrated carbon dioxide. Proc. Roy. Soc. A 172, 445.
- 1942. E.C.C. Baly. The quantum efficiency of photosynthesis. Nature 149, 215.

== Honours ==
In 1909 Baly was elected a Fellow of the Royal Society. In 1918 he was made CBE. He was made an honorary member of the Society of Dyers and Colourists Photograph portraits of Baly are held in the collection of the national Portrait Gallery.

== Personal life ==
Baly was a confident pianist, following the musical skills with the piano and singing of his parents. He and John Arthur Platt founded a musical society at University College in 1902. In the same year he married Ellen Agnes Jago and they had four children together. He became a rock climber and member of the Scottish Mountaineering Club. After retirement he moved to live in Wendover, Buckinghamshire. He died 3 January 1948.
