= Ian Heilbron =

Scottish chemist (1886–1959)

Sir Ian Heilbron
- Born: Isidor Morris Heilbron; 6 November 1886; Glasgow, Scotland
- Died: 14 September 1959 (aged 72)
- Education: Royal Technical College and University of Leipzig
- Spouse: Elda Marguerite Davis
- Children: 2
- Awards: DSO; FRS (1931); Longstaff Prize (1939)
- Scientific career
- Fields: Organic chemistry
- Workplaces: British Army, Royal Technical College; University of Liverpool; University of Manchester, Imperial College; Brewing Industry Research Foundation
- Academic advisors: Arthur Rudolf Hantzsch

Sir Ian Morris Heilbron DSO FRS (6 November 1886 – 14 September 1959) was a Scottish chemist, who pioneered organic chemistry developed for therapeutic and industrial use.

== Early life and education ==
Heilbron was born in Glasgow on 6 November 1886 to a wine merchant (David Heilbron) and his wife (Fanny Jessel). He was Jewish.

He was educated at Glasgow High School and then the Royal Technical College with G. G. Henderson. Following an award of a Carnegie Fellowship he went to the University of Leipzig to study under Arthur Rudolf Hantzsch for his doctoral thesis (1907–1910).

He was awarded a Ph.D. He received a D.Sc. at the University of Glasgow in 1918 for his 'Contribution to the Study of Semi-carbazones' and other papers.

== Military service ==
He served in the Royal Army Service Corps (1910–1920). He was awarded a Distinguished Service Order in 1918 for distinguished service related to operations in Salonika. He was also appointed an Officer of the Order of the Redeemer by the Greek government. He achieved the rank of lieutenant colonel, Assistant Director of Supplies.

During the Second World War from 1939 to 1942 he worked as a scientific advisor to the Department of Scientific Research in the Ministry of Supply. From 1942 to 1945 he became a scientific advisor to the Ministry of Production and assisted in the introduction of DDT.

== Career ==
Appointed Professor at Manchester in 1933, where he was keen to exploit new techniques for micro-analysis, adsorption chromatography, low pressure distillation, and ultra-violet spectroscopy. He was elected o membership of the Manchester Literary and Philosophical Society on 5 November 1935 His independent research career focused on the chemistry of natural products, including work on sterols, vitamin D, vitamin A, polyene synthesis, Squalene, terpenes, pyrylium salts, algal pigments, and spiropyrans. He was also instrumental in the development of DDT to fight malaria and yellow fever. Heilbron, with Arthur Herbert Cook, also studied the synthesis and structure of penicillin.

=== Appointments ===
- Lecturer, Royal Technical College, 1909–14
- Scientist, later consultant at British Dyestuffs Corp. (later renamed Imperial Chemical Industries)
- Professor of organic chemistry, Royal Technical College, 1919–20
- Professor, University of Liverpool, 1920–33 (Heath Harrison Chair of Organic Chemistry)
- Professor, University of Manchester, 1933-8 (Sir Samuel Hall Chair of Chemistry, 1935-8)
- Professor of Organic Chemistry and Director of the Laboratories, Imperial College, 1938–49
- 1949: Retired from academic research
- Director, Brewing Industry Research Foundation, 1949–58
- Chairman of the Advisory Council of the Royal Military College of Science
- International Union of Pure & Applied Chemistry
- Editor-in-chief of the “Dictionary of Organic Compounds” and
- Chairman of the editorial board of “Thorpe’s Dictionary of Applied Chemistry.”

=== Notable trainees ===
==== While at University of Liverpool ====
- Frank Stuart Spring, graduate student (1930)

==== While at University of Manchester ====
- Basil Lythgoe, graduate student, (1936)
- Ewart Ray Herbert Jones, post-doc (1938)

==== While at Imperial College ====
- Stanley H. Harper, graduate student (1937)
- Derek Harold Richard Barton, graduate student (1942)
- Basil Weedon, graduate student, (1942)
- Ralph Alexander Raphael, graduate student (1943)
- Ernest A. R. Braude, graduate student (1944)
- John Arthur Elvidge, graduate student (1947)
- Franz Sondheimer, graduate student (1948)
- Marc Julia, graduate student (1948)

==== While at Imperial Chemical Industries ====
- Alan Woodworth Johnson, research scientist (1946)

=== Notable collaborators ===
==== While at University of Liverpool ====
- Richard Alan Morton

== Awards and honours ==
- 1911: Fellow of the Institute of Chemistry (F.I.C.)
- 1931: Fellow of the Royal Society (FRS)
- 1939: Longstaff Medal of the Chemical Society of London
- 1943: Davy Medal from the Royal Society "In recognition of his many notable contributions to organic chemistry, especially to the chemistry of natural products of physiological importance"
- 1945: The American Chemical Society honored him with its highest prize, the Priestley Medal. This was the first time the award went to a non-American.
- 1946: In recognition of his work during war he was appointed a Knight Bachelor
- 1951: Royal Medal from the Royal Society
