= William Johnston of Liverpool =

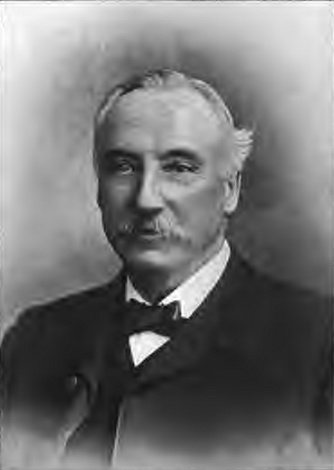

William Johnston of Woodslee, Bromborough, Cheshire (1841–1917) was an early benefactor of the University of Liverpool in Liverpool, England. He was a wealthy Northern Irish ship owner who began business in Liverpool in 1863. The Johnston Laboratories and the Johnston Chair of Biochemistry (the first chair in biochemistry to be established in the UK, in 1903) were named after him. He funded the chair as part of a £25,000- philanthropic gift.
