= Biochemical Society =

Learned society in the United Kingdom in the field of biochemistry

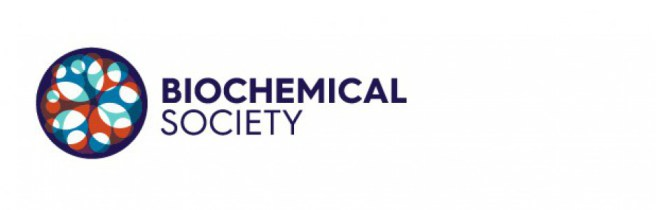
- Formation: 1911
- Legal status: Not-for-profit organisation
- Purpose: Advancing molecular bioscience
- Location: London, UK
- Members: Over 4,500
- Chief Executive: Phil Morgan
- Main organ: Biochemical Society Council
- Affiliations: FEBS
- Website: Biochemical Society

The Biochemical Society is a learned society in the United Kingdom in the field of biochemistry, including all the cellular and molecular biosciences. It was founded in 1911 and acquired the existing Biochemical Journal the following year. The society additionally publishes the journals Clinical Science and Biochemical Society Transactions via its publishing arm, Portland Press. It awards the Colworth Medal and formerly awarded the CIBA Medal (Novartis Medal). As of 2024, the president is Julia Goodfellow.

== Structure ==
As of December 2023, the society had over 4,500 members, mainly in the UK. It is affiliated with the European body, Federation of European Biochemical Societies (FEBS). The president has been Julia Goodfellow since 2022.

The Society's headquarters are in London.

== History ==
The society was founded in 1911, under the name of the Biochemical Club. An informal preliminary meeting on 21 January 1911 at University College, London was organised by John Addyman Gardner and R. H. A. Plimmer and attended by 32 people. The first meeting was on 4 March 1911, with 38 members present; an initial decision to exclude women was rescinded the following year. The first committee consisted of Plimmer (honorary treasurer and secretary), Gardner, H. E. Armstrong, W. M. Bayliss, A. J. Brown, H. H. Dale, A. E. Garrod, W. D. Halliburton, Arthur Harden, F. G. Hopkins, F. Keeble, Benjamin Moore, Walter Ramsden and E. J. Russell. By the end of 1911, there were 132 members.

In 1912, it purchased the existing Biochemical Journal from Moore and Edward Whitley for £150, with the new editors being Bayliss and Harden. The name formally changed to the Biochemical Society in 1913, with Hopkins being appointed the first chair. Gardner took over as treasurer, remaining in the post until 1944, and was responsible for steering the society's finances through the First World War. The three earliest women members, elected in 1913, were Ida Smedley, who became the first female chair of the society, Harriette Chick and Muriel Wheldale. In the early years eight annual meetings were generally held, predominantly in London, but also in Oxford, Cambridge, Rothamsted, Glasgow, Edinburgh and elsewhere.

Membership had risen to over a thousand by 1944, and that year the society proposed the Biological Council, which formed an umbrella organisation for the Anatomical Society, Linnean Society, Pathological Society, Physiological Society and the Society for Experimental Biology. In 1949, the society organised the first International Congress of Biochemistry, in Cambridge, before the foundation of the International Union of Biochemistry in 1955. Plimmer was the society's first historian; his 1949 history is described by the American science historian Robert E. Kohler as an "important primary document" for the early history of biochemistry in the UK, and in particular for why the society's founding members chose to separate from the older Physiological Society. An updated history was published in 1969 by Richard A. Morton.

By the late 1960s, according to science historian Pnina Abir-Am, the society had established itself as a "well-organized nationwide power base for biochemists", and a "powerful" body whose activities went beyond the usual ones of a learned society to encompass "guarding the professional status, even welfare, of its members". In 1969, a subcommittee of the society chaired by Hans Krebs published a well-received report about the relationship between biochemistry and the discipline of molecular biology, stating that all biology was in part molecular, in response to a 1968 report by the Working Group on Molecular Biology, chaired by John C. Kendrew. The report proposes using the term "biochemistry" as a shorthand to include molecular biology as well as biophysics. That year the society celebrated its 500th meeting, at which Kendrew was among the speakers. According to the former CEO Chris Kirk (in 2011), membership peaked in the mid-1990s at around nine thousand, and had since fallen.

The society's first permanent headquarters were at 7 Warwick Court in Holborn, purchased in 1966. In 1990, the headquarters of the society moved to Portland Place, and in 2005, to modern offices in Procter Street, Holborn. In 2009, the headquarters moved again to Charles Darwin House, Roger Street, sharing premises with the Society for Experimental Biology, British Ecological Society and the Royal Society of Biology.

The society's past presidents are Sir Hans Kornberg (1990–95), Sir Philip Randle (1996–2000), Dame Jean O. Thomas (2001–5), Sir Philip Cohen (2006–8), Sir Tom Blundell (2009–12), Ron Laskey (2012–14), Sir David Baulcombe (2015–17) and Sir Peter Downes (2018–21).

== Awards ==
The Society has given awards to acknowledge excellence and achievement in biochemistry or in particular subfields since 1958. The earliest was the Hopkins Memorial Lecture, in memory of Frederick Gowland Hopkins (1958–2008). Later awards include the Colworth Medal (1963), the CIBA Medal/Novartis Medal (1965–2023) and the Morton Lecture, in honour of Richard Alan Morton (1978).

== Publishing ==
The society's wholly owned publishing subsidiary, Portland Press (established in 1989), publishes a magazine, The Biochemist, and several academic journals:

- Biochemical Journal
- Biochemical Society Transactions
- Clinical Science
- Essays in Biochemistry
- Bioscience Reports

== Other activities ==
The society holds archives of material from some prominent biochemists, and had recorded oral history interviews on video with around twenty scientists in 1988. The society published several editions of a "renowned" booklet by V. Booth with advice on how to write a scientific paper.
