= Alfred Theodore MacConkey =

Alfred Theodore MacConkey (1861-17 May 1931) was a British bacteriologist. He developed MacConkey's agar, a selective medium that is used in the diagnosis of enteric pathogens. He was born McConkey but appears to have spelled his name "MacConkey" from at least 1881 and in all his published papers

== Early life and education ==
MacConkey was the youngest of six children born to West Derby minister Andrew McConkey and wife Margaret. He matriculated at Liverpool Collegiate Institution in 1880, studied Natural Sciences at Gonville and Caius College, Cambridge and Medicine at Guy's Hospital, completing his studies in 1889.

== Medical practice and early scientific career ==
He initially went into private practice at Beckenham, Kent, but after illness decided to specialize in bacteriology, joining the Bacteriology department at Guy's Hospital in 1897. This is where he started to develop the culture medium that bears his name. His contemporaries included Herbert Durham.

== Liverpool and the Royal Commission on Sewage Disposal ==
In 1899 he became an assistant bacteriologist serving the Royal Commission on Sewage Disposal in Liverpool under Rubert Boyce at University College, Liverpool. He continued working on the medium. He mainly published single-author papers but would credit Liverpool contemporaries such as Harriette Chick for advice.

== Lister Institute ==
In 1901 he married Henrietta Dixon and transferred to the Lister Institute of Preventive Medicine where the work on the medium was completed with suggestions from the Liverpool laboratory for the inclusion of neutral red and crystal violet.

In 1906 he became responsible for the Serum Department and was heavily involved in production of antiserum for both diphtheria and tetanus, the latter being especially important for treatment of battlefield injuries during the First World War. He succeeded, as requested, in making the department profitable although some questioned his authoritarian management style.

== Death ==
MacConkey retired in 1926 and died childless in 1931 at Brindley Heath, Surrey. His estate of £11,485 was left first for the use of his wife, unless she became or married a Roman Catholic, and residuary of his estate used for annuities for "needy gentlewomen not belonging to the Roman Catholic faith."
