= Margaret Hume =

English nutritionist (1887–1968)

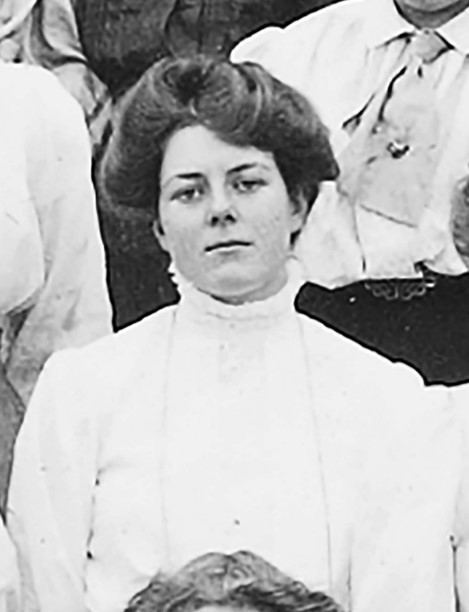
- Margaret Hume at Newnham College in 1909
- Born: 1887
- Died: 1968 (aged 80–81)
- Education: Newnham College, Cambridge
- Awards: Bathurst studentship
- Scientific career
- Fields: Botany; Nutrition
- Workplaces: Botany School, Cambridge; University of the Cape of Good Hope; Lister Institute for Preventative Medicine

Eleanor Muriel Margaret Hume (often known as Margaret or Margot Hume, 1887–1968) was an English botanist, nutritionist and science editor. After lecturing in botany in South Africa and England, she studied nutrition at the Lister Institute of Preventative Medicine and wrote for and edited several nutrition journals.

== Education and early career ==
Educated at Eastbourne Ladies' College, Hume studied the natural sciences tripos at Newnham College, Cambridge, receiving a first class pass in Part II in 1910. She then received a Bathurst studentship to continue her studies, working at the Botany School on her first publications, including a paper engaging with the graft hybrid controversy which was the focus of William Bateson. She also worked on galia under the supervision of Arthur Tansley.

In 1913, Hume worked as lecturer in botany at the South African College at the University of the Cape of Good Hope, returning to England in 1916 to work in munitions. She delivered lectures in biology at University College, London in 1918.

== Lister Institute ==
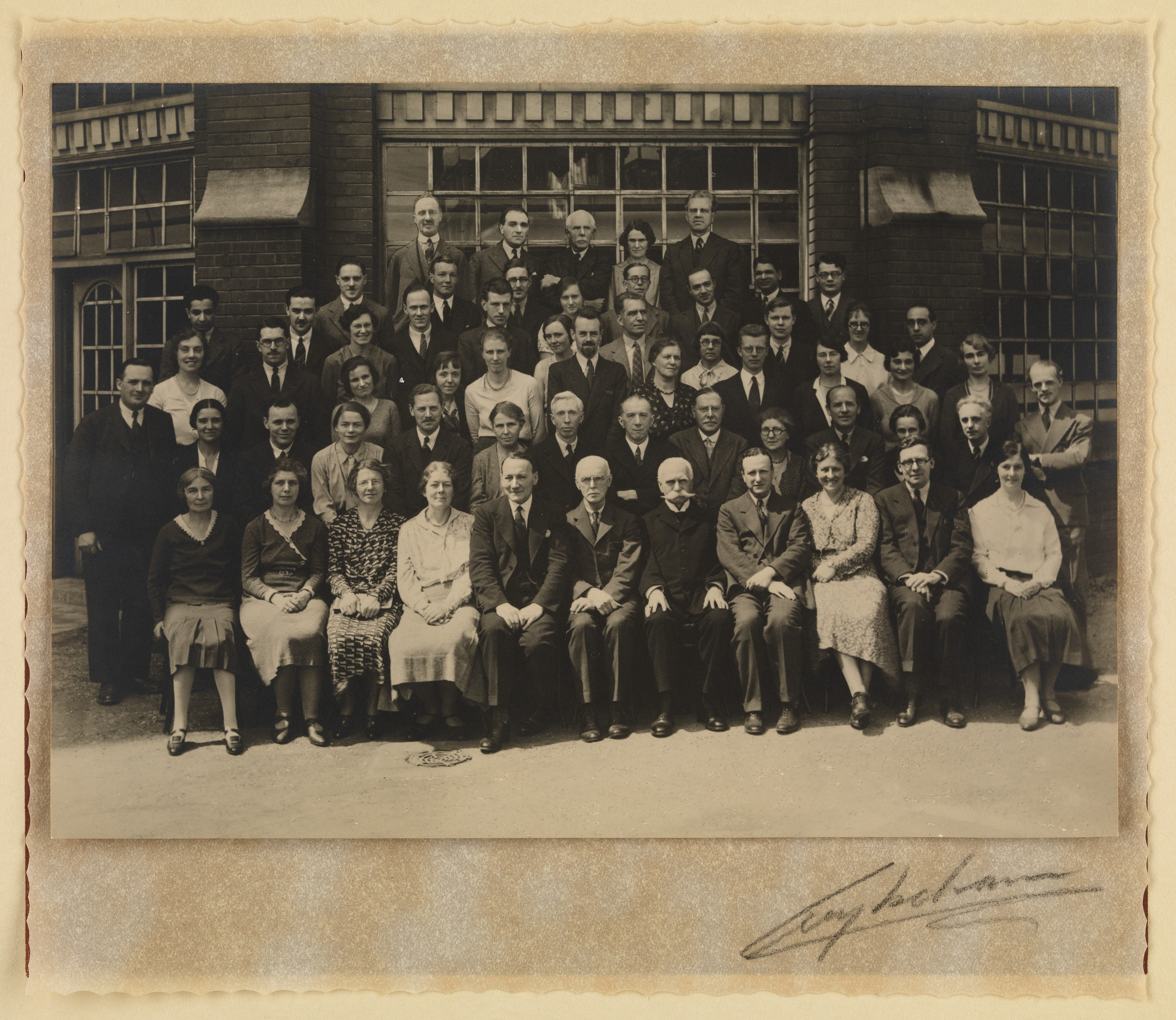
Staff of the Lister Institute in 1933. Hume is fourth from left in the front row.

In 1919 she joined the Lister Institute of Preventative Medicine in London, where she would remain until 1959. The Institute studied the preventative effects of nutrition. For example, Hume conducted preliminary research in a foundling hospital in Vienna which contributed to Harriette Chick's proof that rickets was caused by deficiencies in diet rather than by microbes.

During her time at the Lister Institute, Hume published on nutrition and its impact on medical conditions in medical and scientific journals including the British Journal of Nursing, The Practitioner, the Journal of the Royal Army Medical Corps and the Biochemical Journal. Her specialisms were the vitamins A and D, and she organised co-operative studies for international standards for vitamins. She was also a member of the Accessory Food Factors Committee. Hume, Chick, and virologist Marjorie MacFarlane wrote a history of the Lister Institute which was published in 1971.

== Editorial work ==
An original member of the Nutrition Society, she was joint editor of the first five volumes of its Proceedings, and was on the British Journal of Nutrition and the Proceedings of the Nutrition Society from 1947 to 1959. She was also on the editorial staff of Nutrition Abstracts and Reviews.

She died in 1968.
