= Rideal–Walker coefficient =

Disinfecting power of a disinfectant

The Rideal–Walker coefficient, now only of historical interest, is a figure expressing the disinfecting power of any disinfectant. It is the ratio of the dilution of the disinfectant that kills a microorganism to the dilution of phenol that kills the organism in the same time under identical conditions. The Rideal–Walker coefficient determines the phenol coefficient utilizing the method (test) described by English chemists Samuel Rideal (1863–1929) and J. T. Ainslie Walker (1868–1930).

The arbitrary choice of contact time (sterilisation in 7.5 minutes), diluent (distilled water) and test organism (Salmonella typhi, then called Bacillus typhosa) did not reflect the conditions under which disinfectants were used. Because of this, impossibly high values were obtained for disinfectant activity and quoted by disinfectant manufacturers. The method was referred to by distinguished microbiologist Sir Ashley Miles as "...at best a grossly over-simplified answer to a very difficult problem, and at worst little short of bacteriological prostitution".

It was replaced by a more realistic test devised by Dame Harriette Chick and Sir Charles James Martin, which in turn was replaced by other tests, not reliant on a comparison with phenol, in attempts to assess the effectiveness of particular disinfectants for different purposes.

== See also ==
- Phenol coefficient
