= Percival Hartley =

English immunologist (1881–1957)

Sir Percival Hartley
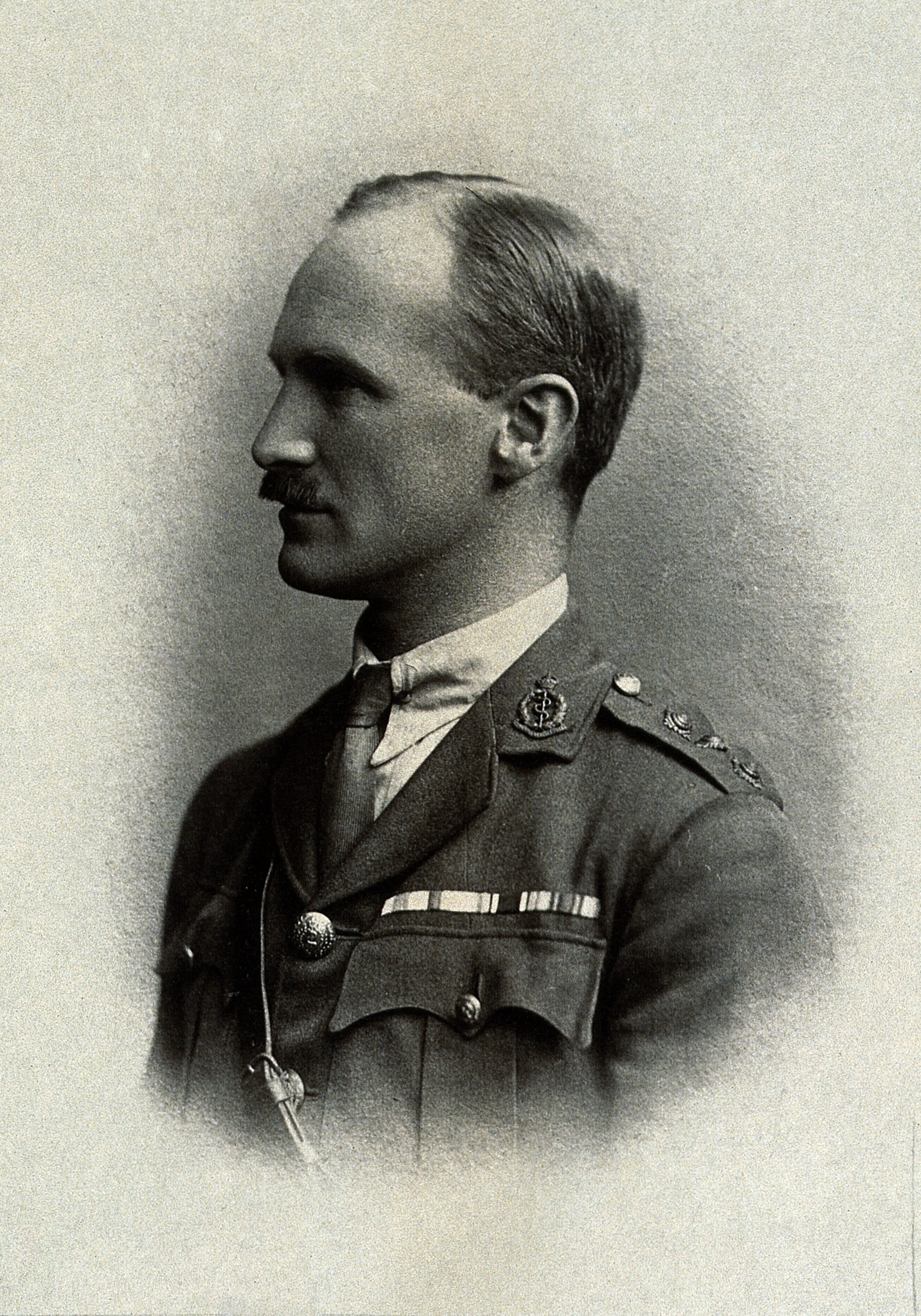
- Born: Percival Hartley; 28 May 1881; Calverley, Yorkshire
- Died: 16 February 1957 (age 75); London
- Education: University of Leeds; University of London
- Spouse: Olga Parnell
- Children: Two daughters
- Awards: CBE; Military Cross; Doctor of Science; FRS; Knight Bachelor
- Scientific career
- Workplaces: Royal Army Medical Corps; Medical Research Council; National Institute for Medical Research; Sir William Dunn School of Pathology; University of Oxford; Lister Institute of Preventive Medicine; London School of Hygiene & Tropical Medicine

Sir Percival Hartley CBE MC FRS (28 May 1881 – 16 February 1957) was an English immunologist who was head of the Medical Research Council (MRC) Biological Standards Division for 44 years.

== Early life and education ==
Harvey was born at Calverley, Yorkshire, England, the son of William Thompson Hartley, a coal merchant. His mother's maiden name was Grimshaw. He was educated at Belle Vue School and attended Bradford Technical College and then the University of Leeds where he studied chemistry, qualifying BSc in 1905. He then won a scholarship to the Lister Institute of Preventive Medicine in London from 1906 to 1908, where he studied under J. B. Leathes. He gained a Doctor of Science degree from the University of London in 1909.

== Career ==
Hartley worked in India for four years as a government physiological chemist based at Muktesar, where he worked on the cattle disease rinderpest. He returned to the Lister Institute in 1913, as an assistant to Arthur Harden in the biochemical department. At the outbreak of the First World War, he joined up with the Royal Army Medical Corps (RAMC) and served as a captain from 1915 to 1919, winning the Military Cross in 1917.

Hartley then worked for two years at the Wellcome Physiological Research Laboratories, where he developed a culture broth that permitted reliable production of diphtheria toxin. In 1922 he joined the National Institute for Medical Research where he became director of biological samples. He stayed till 1946 when he joined the London School of Hygiene & Tropical Medicine. He worked at the Sir William Dunn School of Pathology from 1949 to 1953 and at the Lister Institute again from 1949 to 1953. In the 1940s he worked with Ralph Kekwick.

== Awards and honours ==
He was awarded the CBE in 1922 and elected a Fellow of the Royal Society in 1937. He was knighted in 1944 for work on penicillin.

== Personal life ==
He married Olga Parnell (died 1950) in 1920 and they had two daughters. He died in London.
