= William Leonard Braddon =

British physician and planter (1861-1936)

- Born: 1861; Upton-upon-Severn
- Died: 28 September 1936 (aged 75); Seremban
- Education: University of London
- Occupations: Physician and planter
- Known for: Beriberi

William Leonard Braddon (1861 – 28 September 1936) was a British physician specialising in tropical medicine who was credited as being among the first to attribute the consumption of polished rice to the causation of beriberi.

== Early life and education ==
Braddon was born in 1861 at Upton-upon-Severn, the son of doctor Charles Braddon MRCS. He received medical training at Guy's Hospital, London, receiving his MRCS in 1884 and gaining the MacKenzie-Brown Prize for his essay on nervous diseases. In 1885, he was a Burdett prizeman, and in 1887, he obtained a surgery fellowship (FRCS) from the Royal College of Surgeons, and graduated Bachelor of Medicine and Surgery (MBBS) the same year from the University of London.

== Career ==
After graduating, he briefly went into partnership with his father in Upton-under-Severn before serving as a ship's medical officer on several voyages. In 1889, he joined the British Colonial Service and went to Malaya where he practised medicine as a district surgeon in Negeri Sembilan in the Federated Malay States.

There he became interested in tropical diseases focusing his study on the causes of beriberi and, despite having received no formal training in epidemiology, he acquired epidemiological skills which earned him a reputation as an expert on the disease. In 1907, he published The cause and prevention of beri-beri which was the most comprehensive study up to that time of the pathological and epidemiological aspects of the disease. He attributed the disease to the consumption of polished rice, and although his views at first were not generally accepted, in 1912, his work was recognised when he was rewarded with the Stewart Research Prize by the British Medical Association. Later, he persuaded his friend Charles James Martin, director of the Lister Institute of Preventive Medicine, to take the work further which led to the discovery by Casimir Funk of the cause of the disease in the dietary deficiency of the elements found in unpolished rice but which are removed in processing.

In 1908, he left the colonial service and became a rubber planter in Seremban although he maintained an interest in beriberi and offered medical consultancy services to plantation owners. During the First World War, he received a commission as a temporary major in the Royal Army Medical Corps in 1917. After the war ended, he continued rubber planting in the Federated Malay States becoming an influential member within the rubber planter community until his death.

== Personal life and death ==
Braddon married Marion Philpott in 1897. He died on 28 September 1936 in Seremban.
