= John Charles Grant Ledingham =

British pathologist and bacteriologist

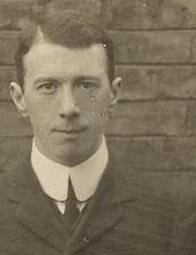
J. C. G. Ledingham in 1907

Sir John Charles Grant Ledingham FRS (19 May 1875 – 4 October 1944) was a British pathologist and bacteriologist.

Ledinham was born at Boyndie (Banff) where James Ledingham, his father, was the local church minister. After education at Banff Academy he attended the University of Aberdeen, graduating M.A. (1895), B.Sc. (1900) and M.B., B.Chir. (1902). He had post-graduate training at the University of Leipzig in 1902–1903 and then did research at the bacteriological laboratories at the University of Aberdeen in 1903–1904 and at the London Hospital in 1904–1905. At the Lister Institute he worked for a few months in the serum department at Elstree but was then transferred to the main institute on Chelsea Embankment. At the Lister Institute he was an assistant bacteriologist from 1905 to 1908 and the chief bacteriologist from 1908 until his retirement, except for a leave of absence for military service. During World War I he was an officer (appointed lieutenant-colonel in 1915) in the Royal Army Medical Corps. In the R.A.M.C. he first served as chief bacteriologist at King George Hospital, Stamford Street, Waterloo, London and then in 1917 as a consultant bacteriologist in Mesopotamia. At the Lister Institute, as the successor to Sir Charles James Martin, Ledingham was the director from 1931 until his retirement in 1943, but also remained the chief bacteriologist during those years.

He was the author or co-author of about 30 publications in refereed journals. His research dealt with a variety of topics, including elementary bodies in viral infections and experimental purpura.

He married in 1913 and was the father of a son and a daughter.

== Awards and honours ==
- 1918 — C.M.G.
- 1921 — F.R.S.
- 1924 — Fellow of the Royal College of Physicians
- 1934 — Herter Lecturer at the Johns Hopkins Medical School in the United States
- 1937 — Knighthood

== Selected publications ==
- with J. A. Arkwright: The Carrier Problem in Infectious Diseases. London: Arnold. 1912.
