= Dorothy Norris =

English biochemist

Dorothy Norris (née Harrop) was an English biochemist who worked on yeast fermentation, protein chemistry, and was a pioneer in the study of carcinogens. She moved to India where she worked at the Indian Institute of Science before becoming the founding director of the Indian Lac Research Institute at Ranchi.

Dorothy Harrop worked with Arthur Harden at the Lister Institute on yeast fermentation, bacterial enzyme chemistry, growth, and on protein reactions. She also worked on the effects of coal tar on cell cultures and noted increased cell division ("auxetic activity"), a known indicator of carcinogenicity.

She moved to India in 1917 along with her husband Roland Victor Norris and was the first woman faculty member at the Indian Institute of Science. In 1924 and 1925, the Indian Lac Research Institute was established at Namkum, Ranchi where Norris was appointed its first director.
