= Phenol coefficient =

The Phenol coefficient, is now largely of historical interest, although the principles upon which it is based are still used. It is a measure of the bactericidal activity of a chemical compound in relation to phenol. When listed numerically, the figure expressing the disinfecting power of a substance by relating it to the disinfecting power of phenol may be a function of the standardized test performed. For example, the Rideal–Walker method, introduced in 1903 gives a Rideal–Walker coefficient and the U.S. Department of Agriculture method gives a U.S. Department of Agriculture coefficient.

To calculate phenol coefficient, the concentration of phenol at which the compound kills the test organism in 10 minutes, but not in 5 minutes, is divided by the concentration of the test compound that kills the organism under the same conditions (or, probably more common, dividing the dilution factor at which the tested substance shows activity by the dilution factor at which phenol shows comparable activity). The Rideal–Walker test was widely used, but the test conditions chosen were unrealistic, and impossibly high values for the coefficient were claimed by disinfectant manufacturers. Distinguished bacteriologist Sir Ashley Miles, reviewing the subject, described the test as "...at best a grossly over-simplified answer to a difficult problem and, at worst little short of bacteriological prostitution". Modifications were made by Dame Harriette Chick and Sir Charles James Martin in 1908. They used more realistic conditions, including 3% sterile faeces to mimic the conditions in which many disinfectants were used. The Chick–Martin test was then widely used until replaced by more suitable tests not reliant on phenol and reflecting the conditions in which modern disinfectants are used.

Calculations by Harriette Chick showed that the killing of bacteria by disinfectants followed first order kinetics. So, the bactericidal activity of a particular disinfectant at a given concentration can be expressed as a constant (k) calculated by employing the formula k = N/C·T where N is the number of surviving cells, C is the concentration of agent applied and T is the time for which the agent is applied, so k is inversely proportional to dose (C·T is collectively called dose).

One way to compare disinfectants is to compare how well they do against a known disinfectant and rate them accordingly using the Phenol coefficient. The disinfectant to be tested is compared with phenol on a standard microbe (usually Salmonella typhi or Staphylococcus aureus). Disinfectants that are more effective than phenol have a coefficient greater than 1; those that are less effective have a coefficient less than 1.
