= BJN =

BJN may refer to:

- Bagh-e-Jahan nama palace, an Afghan palace built by Amir Abdur Rahman
- Banjar language, an Indonesian agglutinative language, ISO 639-3 code
- British Journal of Nutrition, a peer-review scientific journal focusing on nutrition
- Beijing South railway station, China Railway pinyin code BJN
- Bondi Junction railway station, Sydney Trains station code BJN
