= Arthur William Bacot =

English entomologist (1866–1922)

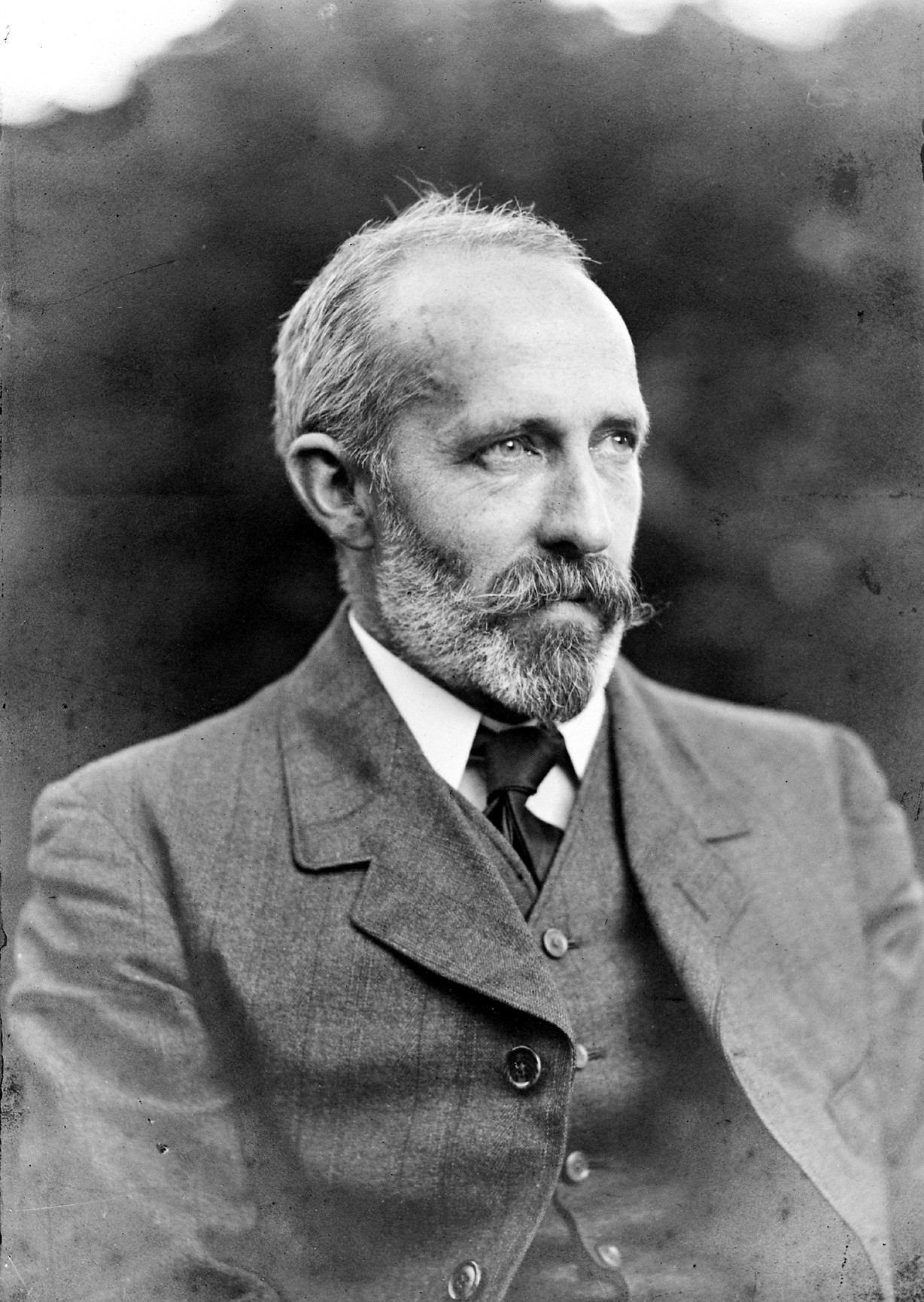

Arthur William Bacot (28 April 1866 – 12 April 1922) was an entomologist at the Lister Institute of Preventive Medicine.

== Early life ==
Bacot was born in North London, the third son and fourth child of Edmund Alexander Bacot and his wife Harriet. He was a poor attender at school which he left at the age of sixteen in 1882. He then became an office worker in the City of London. He appears to have had no formal training in science apart from being a member of the London Natural History Society.

== Career ==
He had been a keen butterfly collector and produced over fifty papers from 1893 and 1909 on British lepidoptera. In 1908 he developed an interest in morphological and genetic research. He developed breeding experiments with the geometrid moth Acidalia virginaria (binomial name Scopula modicaria). As a result of this he gave details in a presentation to the London Hospital Medical School. Professor Greenwood of the Advisory Committee for Plague Investigation was looking for someone to study the breeding habits of the rat flea and how it passes on the plague virus. Bacot was asked to do the research in his spare time with a small fee and all expenses paid. The program was a success and as a result Bacot joined the Lister Institute.

In 1914 during the First World War he went to Sierra Leone in British West Africa to study Yellow Fever.

By autumn 1917 there was concern about the reduced efficiency of the British Expeditionary Force in France caused by trench fever. In 1917 he went together with Joseph Arkwright to investigate the cause and prevention of this incapacitating epidemic. He discovered the relationships of lice with both typhus and trench fever. Bacot caught the latter disease himself whilst in Warsaw.

== Death ==
In 1922 he went to Cairo with Arkwright at the request of the Egyptian Government to study typhus. Both caught the disease from lice. Arkwright survived after a long illness; Bacot died aged 55.
