= Federation of European Nutrition Societies =

Federation of European Nutrition Societies (FENS)
- Abbreviation: FENS
- Formation: 1979
- Type: NGO
- Headquarters: London, UK
- Region served: Europe
- Official language: English
- President: Sladjana Sobajic, Serbia
- Parent organization: International Union of Nutritional Sciences
- Website: fensnutrition.org

The Federation of European Nutrition Societies (FENS) is a non-profit association, established in 1979 as an umbrella organization for the national nutrition societies of Europe. Each member country is represented by its representative Nutrition Society or Association within FENS.

The aims of FENS are the combination of efforts for the development of research and education in Nutrition Sciences and the promotion of the importance of Nutrition for public health in Europe. It seeks to do this by coordinating the European nutrition societies at a European level, promoting and disseminating research and knowledge on nutrition sciences and facilitating nutrition learning and training, as well as scientific exchange across Europe.

== Activities ==
FENS conducts every 4 years its main event, the FENS European Nutrition Conference, which is organized by one of the FENS member societies, elected by the FENS General Assembly. All FENS Member Societies and Associations can take part in the bidding process for the organization of a FENS ENC.

The Federation of European Nutrition Societies is a member of the International Union of Nutritional Sciences (IUNS) and holds Affiliated Body status. The official FENS Journal is the “Annals of Nutrition and Metabolism” (IF 2022/2023: 5.923). CiteScore:6.0.

== FENS Members (status 2023) ==
Country	Society Name
Austria	Austrian Nutrition Society / Österreichische Gesellschaft für Ernährung (ÖEG)
Belgium	Belgian Nutrition Society
Bosnia and Herzegovina	Association of Applied Nutrition in Bosnia and Herzegovina
Bulgaria	Bulgarian Society of Nutrition and Dietetics
Croatia	Croatian Society for Nutrition
Czech Republic	Czech Society of Nutrition
Denmark	Selskabet for Ernæringsforskning (SfE)
Finland	Finnish Society for Nutrition Research
France	French Society for Nutrition / Société Française de Nutrition (SfN)
Georgia	Georgian Nutrition Society
Germany	German Nutrition Society / Deutsche Gesellschaft für Ernährung (DGE e.V.)
Greece	Hellenic Nutrition Society
Hungary	Hungarian Nutrition Society / Magyar Táplálkozástudományi Társaság (MTT)
Iceland	Iceland Nutrition Society
Italy	Italian Society of Human Nutrition (SINU)
North Macedonia	Macedonian Society for Nutrition and Health
Montenegro	Montenegrin Food and Nutrition Society
Norway	Norwegian Society for Nutrition / Norsk Selskap for Ernæring (NSE)
Poland	Polish Society of Nutritional Sciences
Portugal	Portuguese Society of Nutrition & Food Science
Romania	Romanian Nutrition Society / Societatea de Nutritie din Romania
Serbia	Serbian Nutrition Society
Spain	Spanish Nutrition Society / Sociedad Española de Nutrición (SEÑ)
Sweden	Swedish Society for Clinical Nutrition (SFKN)
Switzerland	Swiss Society for Nutrition / Schweizerische Gesellschaft für Ernährung (SGE)
Netherlands	Dutch Academy of Nutritional Sciences
United Kingdom & Ireland	The Nutrition Society

== European Nutrition Conferences ==
Conference	Year	City	Country
1st European Nutrition Conference (previous to FENS)	1973	Cambridge	United Kingdom
2nd European Nutrition Conference (previous to FENS)	1976	Munich	Germany
3rd European Nutrition Conference (FENS Foundation)	1979	Uppsala	Sweden
4th European Nutrition Conference FENS	1983	Amsterdam	Netherlands
5th European Nutrition Conference FENS	1987	Warsaw	Poland
6th European Nutrition Conference FENS	1991	Athens	Greece
7th European Nutrition Conference FENS	1995	Vienna	Austria
8th European Nutrition Conference FENS	1999	Lillehammer	Norway
9th European Nutrition Conference FENS	2003	Rome	Italy
10th European Nutrition Conference FENS	2007	Paris	France
11th European Nutrition Conference FENS	2011	Madrid	Spain
12th European Nutrition Conference FENS	2015	Berlin	Germany
13th European Nutrition Conference FENS	2019	Dublin	Ireland
14th European Nutrition Conference FENS	2023	Belgrade	Serbia
15th European Nutrition Conference FENS	2027	Rotterdam	Netherlands
