= Roland Victor Norris =

English biochemist (1888–1950)

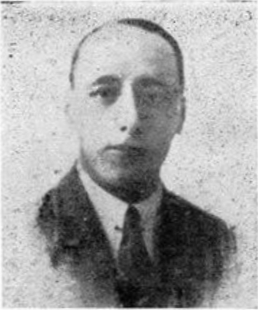
- Born: 1888
- Died: 28 April 1950 (aged 61–62); Port Shepstone, Colony of Natal
- Education: Manchester University, London University (D.Sc.)
- Known for: Human nutrition, soil nutrients and microbiological processes
- Spouses: Dorothy Norris; Wendy Elizabeth Marie
- Children: One daughter (by second wife)
- Scientific career
- Fields: Biochemistry, agricultural chemistry
- Institutions: Lister Institute of Preventive Medicine, London; Imperial Bacteriological Laboratory, India; Indian Institute of Science; Tea Research Institute, Ceylon (now Sri Lanka)

Roland Victor Norris (1888 – 28 April 1950) was a biochemist and agricultural scientist who worked in India and Ceylon. (Note: Now Sri Lanka) He served as the first agricultural chemist to the government of Madras.

== Biography ==
Norris graduated from Manchester University and worked as an assistant to W.H. Perkin. He then worked at the Lister Institute of Preventive Medicine in London. In 1910 he worked with Professor Arthur Harden on yeast fermentation and received a D.Sc. from London University. In 1914 he took up the post of Physiological Chemist at the Imperial Bacteriological Laboratory in Mukteshwar, India. He served in the Indian Army briefly during the war and in 1918 he became the first Agricultural Chemist to the government of Madras. From 1924 to 1929 he worked as a professor of biochemistry at the Indian Institute of Science working on a range of agricultural problems including soil fertility, the chemistry of shellac and the spike disease of sandalwood. He moved to Ceylon in 1929 where he served as director of the Tea Research Institute.

He was married to biochemist Dorothy Norris who later worked at the Lac research institute in Ranchi, Jharkhand, India. He was married secondly to Wendy Elizabeth Marie Quigley in 1934 and a daughter, Wendy Elizabeth Anne Jill, was born in Ceylon. He visited South Africa in November 1949 and died in 1950 at Port Shepstone, South Africa. He took a keen interest in sports, drama, and was a Freemason.

== Publications ==
Norris' work in England was mostly on glycogen metabolism and yeast fermentation. After moving to India, he worked on a range of topics including human nutrition, soil nutrients and microbiological processes.

- Harden, Arthur; Norris, Roland V. (1910). "The Fermentation of Galactose by Yeast and Yeast-Juice (Preliminary Communication.)". Proceedings of the Royal Society of London. Series B. 82 (560): 645–649. Bibcode:1910RSPSB..82..645H. doi:10.1098/rspb.1910.0060. JSTOR 80311.
- McCarrison, Robert; Norris, Rol V (1924). "The Relationship of Rice to Beri-Beri in India". Indian Medical Research Memoirs. 2: 1–87.
- McCarrison, R.; Newcomb, C.; Viswanath, B.; Norris, R.V. (1927). "The Relation of Endemic Goitre to the Iodine-Content of Soil and Drinking-Water". Indian Journal of Medical Research. 15: 207–46.
- Thakur, A. K.; Norris, Roland V. (1928). "A bio-chemical study of some soil fungi with special reference to ammonia production". Journal of the Indian Institute of Science. 11: 141.
- Ayyar; Ramaswami, CV; Perumal, T. S. S.; Norris, Roland V. (1929). "The oxidation of sulphur in suspensions of activated sludge and its influence on the solubilization of mineral phosphates". Journal of the Indian Institute of Science. 11: 85–90. [The inventor of the activated sludge process, Gilbert John Fowler was his predecessor at the Indian Institute of Science]
- Report on a Visit to Java [with plates, written by the chairman and the director] (1935). Colombo: Tea Research Institute of Ceylon.
