= Marjorie MacFarlane =

British biochemist (1904–1973)

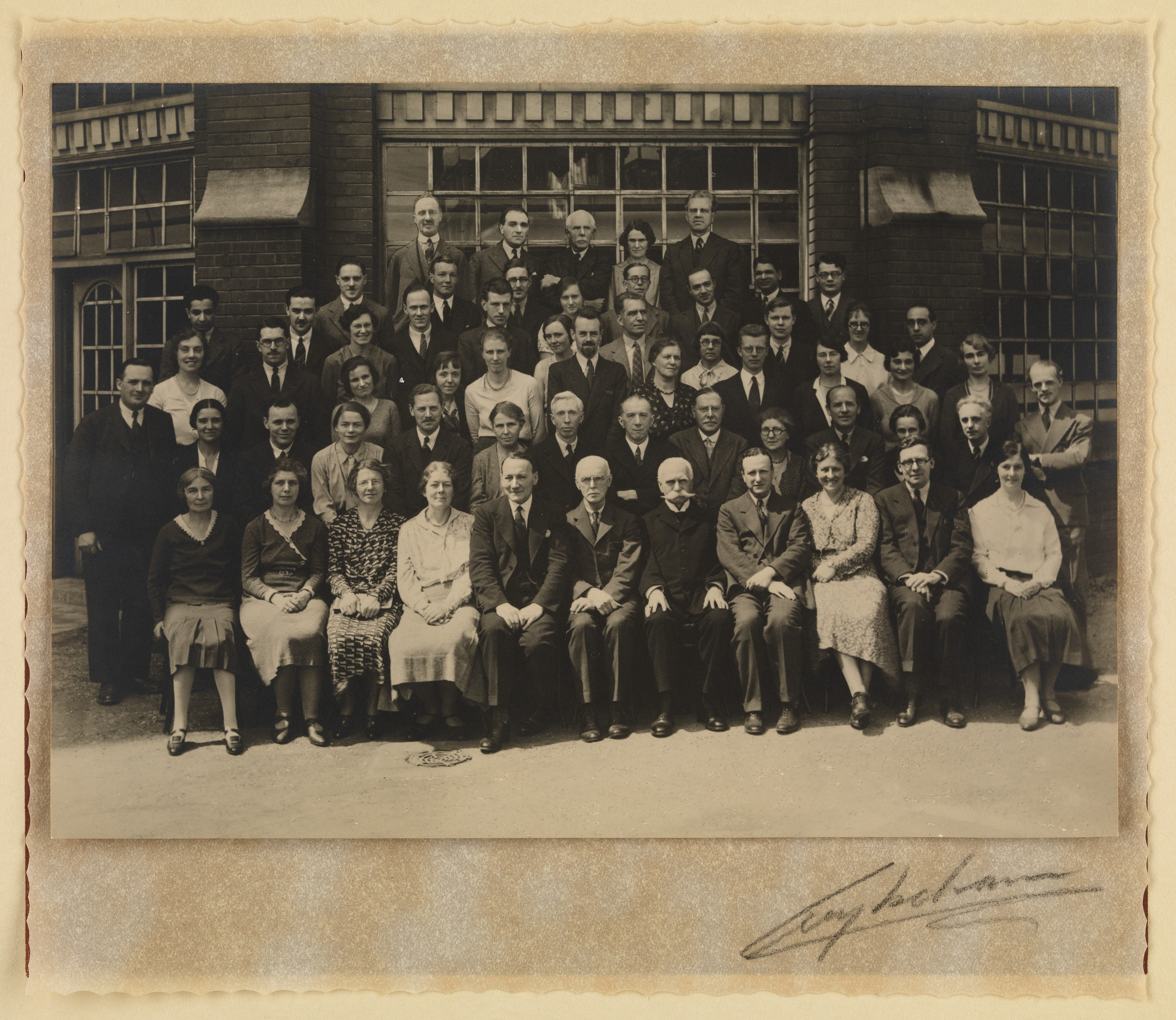
Staff of the Lister Institute in 1933. Marjorie MacFarlane is fourth from left in the second row up.

Marjorie Giffen MacFarlane (1904–1973) was a British physiologist and biochemist known for her research into anaerobic infection.

== Life ==
She was born in Hartlepool in 1904. She gained a BSc in physiology from the University of St Andrews in 1926, and then a DSc from the University of London.

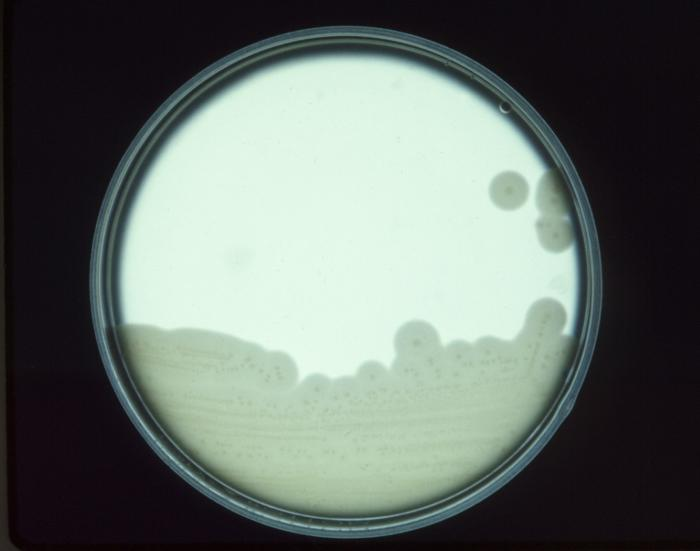
Petri dish containing Clostridium welchii, the subject of one of MacFarlane's discoveries

MacFarlane then joined the staff of the Lister Institute of Preventative Medicine. She served as secretary of the Anaerobic Wound Infections sub-committee there and was a prolific researcher and publisher of scientific articles, including discovering and characterising several toxins for the first time. One of her most significant discoveries came in 1941 when, along with her colleague B.C.J.G. Knight, she isolated the toxin of Clostridium welchii and showed that it was an enzyme. This was the first time it had been demonstrated that a toxin could attack cell membranes in this way, and opened up the possibility of developing an anti-toxin to combat this bacterium, which had been one of the main causes of gas gangrene in World War I.

Along with her colleagues Harriette Chick and Margaret Hume, she published a history of the Lister Institute in 1971.

She died suddenly in Hartlepool on 17 July 1973.
