= Leyton Sixth Form College =

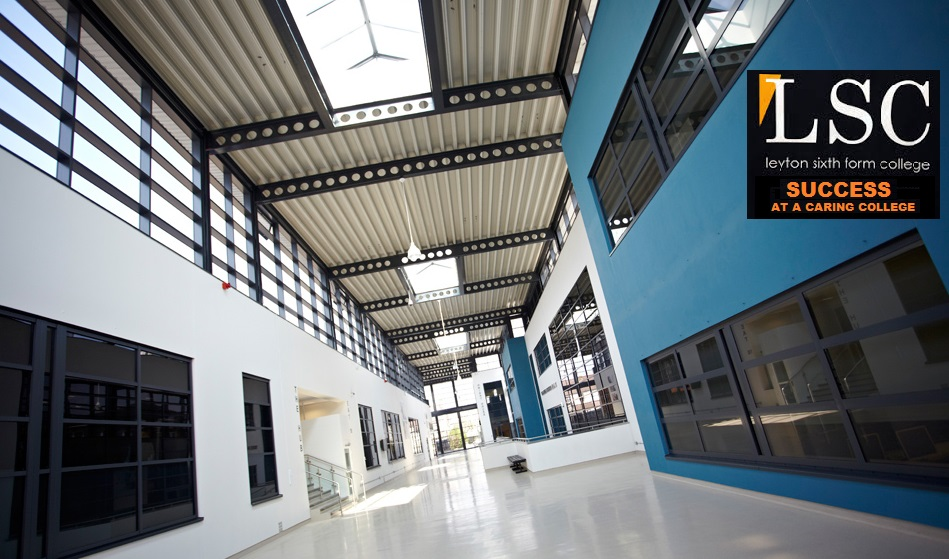

Location
- Essex Road; Leyton, London, E10 6EQ; England, United Kingdom; 51°34′34″N 0°00′09″W

Information
- Type: Sixth form college
- Motto: Success at a Caring College
- Religious affiliation: Mixed
- Established: 1929-1985 – founding institutions 1985 – current sixth form college
- Local authority: Greater London LSC & Waltham Forest LEA
- Department for Education URN: 130457 Tables
- Ofsted: Reports
- Principal: Gill Burbridge
- Gender: Co-educational
- Age: 16+
- Enrolment: 2100+ (2016)
- Houses: 3
- Colours: White & Blue
- Website: http://www.leyton.ac.uk

Leyton Sixth Form College or LSC is a public sixth form college located in the southern part of the London Borough of Waltham Forest. There are over 2,100 learners, of which 80% study courses at Level 3.

== Courses and specialisms ==
The college offers a wide mix of academic and vocational full-time courses, containing more than 35 A level subjects, 15 BTEC subjects, some International GCSE subjects, GNVQ subjects and ESOL programmes.
The college has formal partnerships with Queen Mary University of London and the University of Westminster.

== Management ==
The chemistry security policy recognises the head casing worn by many female Muslim students.

The college serves large groups of students from minority ethnic backgrounds, estimated at 75 per cent as of 1995.

== History ==
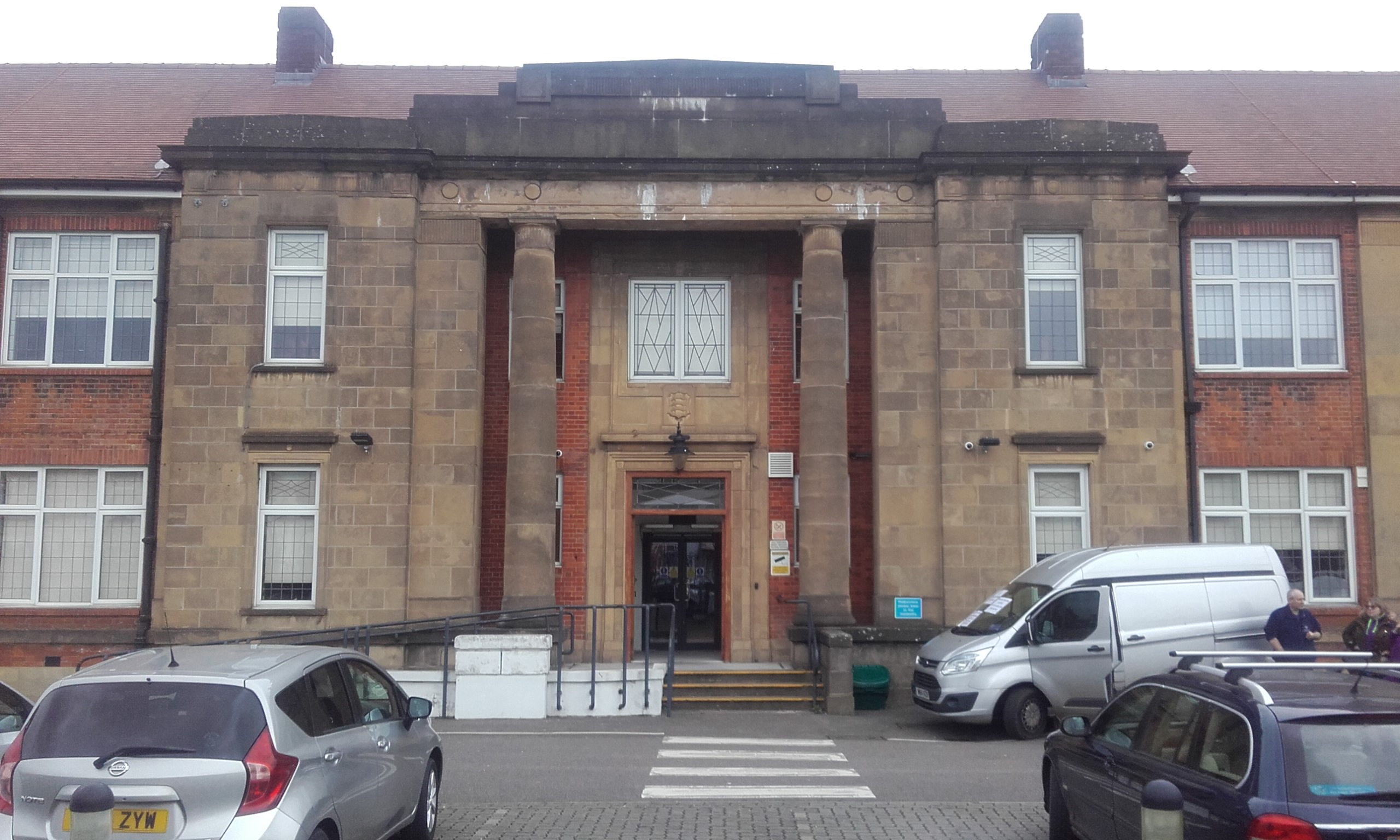
The former Leyton County High School building which was opened in 1929 by the Prince of Wales. It has been extensively modernised internally.

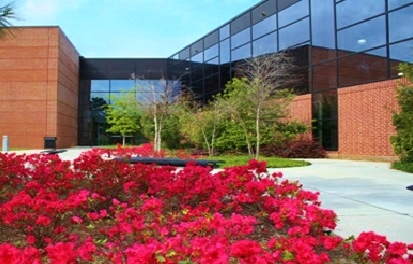
The main campus on Essex Road.

=== Leyton County High School for Boys ===
Leyton County High School for Boys was formed in 1916 by amalgamation of Leyton and Leytonstone high schools. The school occupied temporary premises at Connaught Road until 1929, when it moved to new buildings in Essex Road. The opening was performed by the Prince of Wales. It was a selective grammar school for boys aged 11 to 18. The counterpart of this school was the Leyton County High School for Girls on Colworth Road. Head Master for the school in the 1940-1949 period was Dr Couch, a cousin of Dr Quiller-Couch. He presided over the school while it housed first-year pupils at Ruckholt Road annex, a building partly damaged in the World War 2 air raids on the nearby Temple Mills marshalling yard. The site is now a car sales outlet. No doubt there was an influx of pupils at the end of the war that could not be accommodated in other Grammar Schools that had been damaged in that area of South West Essex.

In 1992, Paul Estcourt (who attended during the period 1957-64) published a book entitled "L.C.H.S. at its Peak". This book not only described his recollections but also the academic and sporting achievements under the leadership of John Cummings, who succeeded Dr Couch as Headmaster.

=== Sixth form college ===
In 1968, Waltham Forest adopted the comprehensive system and in its new guise it catered for mixed-ability 14- to 18-year-old boys as Leyton Senior High School for Boys before a borough-wide re-organisation in 1985 led a change of role as a co-educational sixth form college.

=== Building programme ===
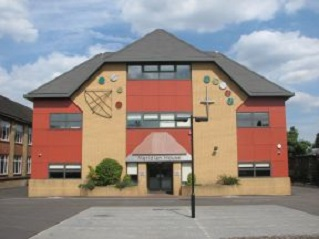
The Meridian House, which represents two of the Greenwich meridian instruments.

The college's 40 million pounds building project has been finished. The new theatre has become the venue for drama and musical performances. The college's purpose built television studio has been established. The street that now links all institution buildings has put on events as varied as a World Food Day and the annual Higher Education fair taking place in it.

A new gymnasium, fitness suite, locker rooms and ablution areas for Muslims, have seen a large rise in student and staff participation in sport as well as providing facilities for local schools and especially for Muslims, where either males and females can pray Jumu'ah.

The final stage of the scheme was an extension to the existing Meridian House, and the complete refurbishment of the original college building. The Prime Meridian passes through this, which is Hooke’s 10-foot Mural Quadrant. The enlargement now accommodates the Business and Travel departments as well as providing new infrastructures for Art and Design. The reconstructing building has provided a new library and a drop-in computer centre, named the Hub and rebuilt Maths and science sectors.

== Honours ==
LSC has been one of the few colleges in London to acquire their own operating warrant for the Duke of Edinburgh’s Award project.

The college has achieved the Investors in People Gold Award, one of the most prestigious honours that is obtained by 1% of United Kingdom’s corporations.

In April 2013, when Leyton Sixth Form College won the British Colleges Sport’s annual award, it was nominated to be the best college in London for sport.

== Former notable teachers ==
- Sir William Emrys Williams, editor in chief of Penguin Books 1935–65 (taught English in the 1920s)
- Phil Woosnam, footballer for Leyton Orient and West Ham (taught maths and physics in the late 1950s)
- David Flaxen, director of statistics from 1989-96 at the Department of Transport (taught in 1963)

== Alumni ==
- Mehmet Aksoy, Turkish-Kurdish film-maker and YPG press officer
- Sir George Bolton, chairman of the Bank of London and South America 1957–70
- Alan Booth, travel writer
- Prof Sir Giles Brindley, professor of physiology in the University of London at the Institute of Psychiatry 1968–91
- Prof Bernard Corry, economist at Queen Mary College
- Bobby Crush, entertainer
- Paul Di'Anno, former singer of Iron Maiden
- Prof Robert Gibson, professor of French at the University of Kent in Canterbury 1965–94
- Prof Laurance Hall, Herchel Smith Professor of Medicinal Chemistry at the University of Cambridge 1985–2004, worked on early NMR spectroscopy
- Steve Harris of Iron Maiden
- Frank Hawkins, chairman of International Tea Co. Stores 1959–73
- Zulfiqar Hussain, chairman of Raeburn Energy Limited.
- Sir Derek Jacobi CBE, actor
- Prof Ralph Kekwick, professor of biophysics at The Lister Institute of Preventive Medicine (part of London University) 1966–71, pioneered blood plasma fractionation
- John Lill CBE, pianist
- Nick Logan, former editor NME, founder editor Smash Hits, editor/publisher The Face, Arena, Arena Homme Plus
- Lomana LuaLua, footballer
- Philip Burton Moon, Poynting Professor of Physics in the University of Birmingham 1950–74, member of the Manhattan Project
- Frank Muir, broadcaster
- NAO, singer
- Jonathan Ross, former BBC presenter
- Paul Ross, radio presenter
- Eric Shilling, bass-baritone
- Tim Stoner, painter
- Sir Philip Wilkinson, chief executive of NatWest 1983–7
- Peter Winch, philosopher
