= Alexander Houston =

Sir Alexander Houston KBE CVO FRS FRSE
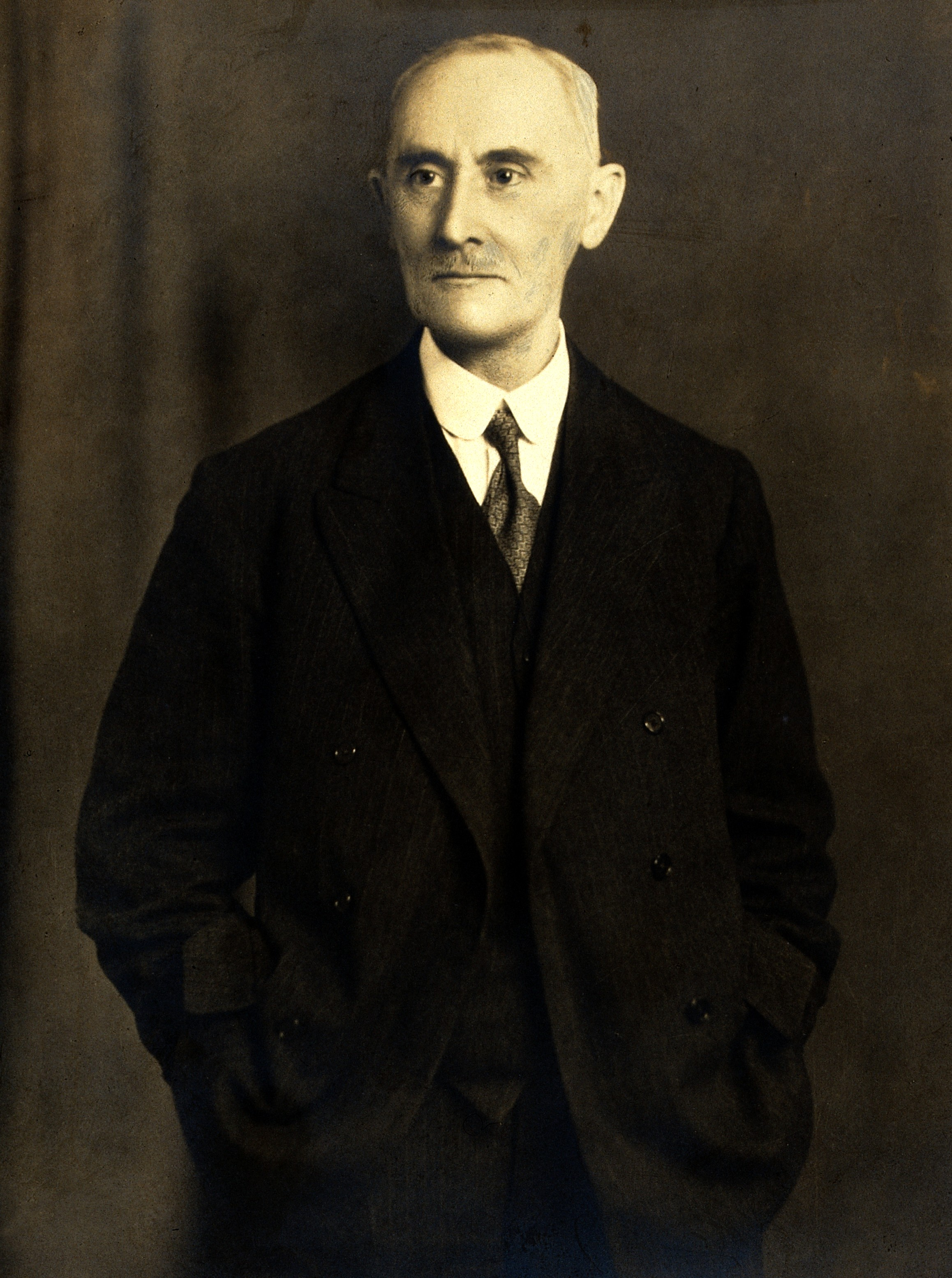

Director of Water Examination, Metropolitan Water Board
- In office 1905 – 29 October 1933

Personal details
- Born: Alexander Cruikshank Houston; 18 September 1865 Mysore, India
- Died: 29 October 1933 (aged 68) Hampstead, London, England

Sir Alexander Cruikshank Houston KBE CVO FRS FRSE (18 September 1865 – 29 October 1933) was an expert on water supply and public health, of Scottish ancestry, who rose to be Director of Water Examination for London's Metropolitan Water Board.

== Life ==
He was born on 18 September 1865 in Mysore in India the eldest son of Isabella Mitchell and her husband, Surgeon General John Houston of the Indian Medical Service (IMS). He was educated at Merchiston Castle School and then studied medicine at the University of Edinburgh, graduating with an MB in 1889. He then studied for a general science degree, graduating with a BSc in 1891, and a doctorate (DSc) in 1892. In 1893 he began studies on lead poisoning within water supplies for the Local Government Board.

In 1897 he was elected a Fellow of the Royal Society of Edinburgh. His proposers were Andrew Douglas Maclagan, Alexander Crum Brown, Charles Hunter Stewart and Sir Arthur Mitchell.

In 1898 he began working for London County Council and in 1899 was employed as a bacteriologist with the Royal Commission on Sewage Disposal. From 1905 he became Director of Water Examinations, establishing water purity, for London and the Metropolitan area. He also looked at the effects of water supply on certain plants and milk production. He was sent to Lincoln during a typhoid epidemic to establish the link to water supply.

In 1907 he worked on establishing a new and safe water supply for Cairo in Egypt and in the same year worked on the Belfast Health Inquiry. In 1913 he visited Ottawa in Canada with Sir Alexander Binnie to report on that city's water supply.

He was created a Knight Commander of the British Empire (KBE) in 1918 and a Commander of the Royal Victorian Order (CVO) in 1919. In 1931 he was elected a Fellow of the Royal Society of London. He received an honorary doctorate (LLD) from the University of Edinburgh shortly before he died.

He died at home in Hampstead on 29 October 1933.

== Publications ==
- Studies in Water Supplies (1914)
- Rivers as Sources of Water Supply (1917)
- Rural Water Supplies and their Purification (1918)

== Family ==
In 1899 he married Ethel Hartley.

== Artistic recognition ==
His portrait photograph, by Walter Stoneman, is held by the National Portrait Gallery, London.
