= Leslie Collier =

British virologist

- Born: Leslie Harold Collier; 9 February 1921
- Died: 14 March 2011 (aged 90); London
- Education: Brighton College; University College Hospital Medical School in London
- Known for: trachoma virology smallpox vaccine chlamydias infection pathology
- Spouse: Adeline Barnett (1942–?) (1 child)
- Scientific career
- Workplaces: St Helier Hospital, Carshalton the Lister Institute the Vaccines and Sera laboratories at Elstree the University of London the Royal London Hospital the Royal Society of Pathologists the Royal Society of Medicine

Leslie Harold Collier (9 February 1921 – 14 March 2011) was a scientist responsible for developing a freeze-drying method to produce a more heat stable smallpox vaccine in the late 1940s. Collier added a key component, peptone, a soluble protein, to the process. This protected the virus, enabling the production of a heat-stable vaccine in powdered form. Previously, smallpox vaccines would become ineffective after 1–2 days at ambient temperature.

The development of his vaccine production method played a large role in enabling the World Health Organization to initiate its global smallpox eradication campaign in 1967.

== Publications ==
Collier was a co-editor of the eighth edition and editor-in-chief of the five-volume ninth edition of the "microbiologist’s bible", Topley and Wilson's Principles of Bacteriology and Immunity (now Topley and Wilson's Microbiology and Microbial Infections), which won the Society of Authors' 1998 award in the advanced edited book category.
He was also joint editor of Developments in Antiviral Chemotherapy (1980).
He was a co-author of Human Virology (1993).
