= The Nutrition Society =

British learned society

- Formation: 1941
- Type: Nonprofit
- Headquarters: Boyd Orr House; 10 Cambridge Court; 210 Shepherds Bush Road; London W6 7NJ UK
- Key people: Mark Hollingsworth (CEO); Mary Ward (President)
- Website: http://nutritionsociety.org

The Nutrition Society is a main scientific learned society in the field of nutritional science, whose headquarters are in London.

== History ==
It was founded in 1941. On Tuesday 14 October 1941, a founding meeting was held at the Royal Institution led by Sir John Boyd Orr who served as its founding chairman. Orr was awarded Nobel Peace Prize for his commitment to nutrition and his role in setting up the Food and Agriculture Organization at the United Nations.

In April 1943, an oversight Advisory Committee on Nutrition Surveys was set up, overseen by Sir Joseph Barcroft, and supported by the Ministry of Health and Ministry of Food. The Nutrition Society was incorporated as a company in August 1976. In 1993, a database was set up, with the Institute of Biology, of registered nutritionists. The register for nutritionists was divested as the Association for Nutrition.

== Leadership ==
Mark Hollingsworth is the CEO of The Nutrition Society, a position he has held since July 2014. Mary Ward, Professor of Nutrition and Dietetics at the Nutrition Innovation Centre for Food and Health (NICHE) at the School of Biomedical Sciences, Ulster University, became the Society's President in July 2023, following the tenure of Julie Lovegrove, the Hugh Sinclair Professor of Nutrition at the University of Reading, who served as President from 2018 to 2023.

== Members ==
The Nutrition Society has approximately 2300 members in 80 countries. Becoming a member is open to those interested in human or animal nutrition, with no specific qualifications required. The society offers student membership, university group membership, early career membership, full membership, retired membership, and unwaged membership.

== Structure ==
=== Sections ===
The Nutrition Society has the following sections:

- Irish Section to host research meetings and conferences in Ireland
- Scottish Section to host research meetings and conferences in Scotland
- Student Section to support undergraduate, graduate, and postgraduate student members, enabling them to connect with experienced researchers and practitioners for mentorship and resources

=== Themes and Special Interest Groups ===
The Nutrition Society has special interest groups in four themes in nutrition science:

- Food Systems
- Nutrition in the treatment, management, and prevention of disease
- Nutrition and optimum life course
- Novel nutrition research methodologies and technologies

=== Fellows ===
The Nutrition Society awards honorary fellowship for outstanding contribution and long term commitment to nutritional science. The honorary fellows are: Sir George Alberti, Margaret Ashwell, Judith Buttriss, Albert Flynn, Keith Frayn, Catherine Geissler, Michael Gibney, Leif Hambraeus, Jo Hautvast, Alan A Jackson, W Philip James, Barbara Livingstone, John Mathers, Geraldine McNeill, D Joe Millward, Hilary J Powers, Ann Prentice, Sean Strain, Alison E Tedstone, Paul Trayhurn, Mark L. Wahlqvist, John F. Webster, Roger G. Whitehead, Christine Williams, Margaret Gill, Clyde Williams, and Chris Seal.

== Activities ==
The Nutrition Society mission is to advance the scientific study of nutrition and its application to the maintenance of human and animal health.

=== Conferences ===
The Nutrition Society hosts six conferences each year.

- Winter Conference
- Summer Conference
- Irish Section Conference
- Scottish Section Conference
- Irish Section Postgraduate Conference
- Nutrition Futures

=== Partnerships and Collaborations ===
The Nutrition Society advocates for the importance of nutritional research and its application in the maintenance of human and animal health. The society serves as the secretariat for the International Union of Nutrition Sciences (IUNS), the Federation of European Nutrition Societies (FENS), and the Academy of Nutritional Sciences

In the United Kingdom, the society has established an All Party Parliamentary Group (APPG) entitled Nutrition: Science and Health. Formally launched at its inaugural meeting on 6 June 2023, the APPG includes interested MPs and members of the House of Lords as founding members. Through this initiative, the society ensures that nutritional research is represented and considered in the UK parliament and reinforcing the importance of this field in shaping public policy.

=== Awards and Grants ===
The Nutrition Society offers the following awards to recognize excellence and expertise in the field of nutrition research.

- Blaxter award for excellence in the area of whole body metabolism or animal nutrition
- Widdowson award for excellence in public health nutrition
- Gowland Hopkins award for lifetime achievement in cellular and molecular nutrition
- Julie Wallace award for early career scientific excellence in nutrition research
- Cuthbertson award for early career excellence in clinical nutrition and metabolism research
- Silver medal for scientific excellence in the field of nutrition
- Postgraduate competition award for excellence in nutrition related work at postgraduate level

The society offers summer studentships to undergraduates to undertake research and conference grants to members to present research and attend conferences.

== Publications ==
=== Journals ===
The following journals are published by the Nutrition Society:

- The British Journal of Nutrition
- Public Health Nutrition
- The Proceedings of the Nutrition Society
- Nutrition Research Reviews
- Journal of Nutritional Science
- Gut Microbiome

=== Books ===
The following text books on nutrition are published by Wiley-Blackwell on behalf of the Nutrition Society.

- Nutrition Research Methodologies
- Introduction to Human Nutrition, 3rd Edition
- Nutrition and Metabolism, 2nd Edition
- Public Health Nutrition, 2nd Edition
- Sport and Exercise Nutrition
- Clinical Nutrition, 2nd Edition

== See also ==
- American Society for Nutrition
- Association for Nutrition, regulates the profession in the UK
- British Nutrition Foundation, provides health education on diet in the UK
- Federation of European Nutrition Societies
- Catherine Geissler, former president of the Nutrition Society
