= Philip Wilkinson (banker) =

Sir Philip Wilkinson
- Born: 8 May 1927; Leyton, United Kingdom
- Died: August 23, 2007 (aged 80)
- Education: Leyton Sixth Form College
- Spouse: Eileen Malkin (m. 1951)
- Children: 3

Sir Philip William Wilkinson (8 May 1927 – 23 August 2007) was a British banker. He worked for NatWest all his life, rising to CEO during NatWest's period of greatest prosperity in the 1980s.

== Early life ==
Wilkinson was born in Leyton, United Kingdom. His father worked for the Metropolitan Water Board. He was educated at Leyton Sixth Form College.

== Career ==
Wilkinson started his working life as a clerk for the Westminster Bank in 1943, aged 16. He was called up for the Royal Navy shortly before the end of World War II and commissioned as sub-lieutenant. He served at Londonderry in Loch-class destroyers on anti-submarine duty.

Returning to the bank in 1948, he rose through the clerical ranks and became secretary to the chief general manager in 1963. He was appointed branch manager for High Wycombe from 1966 to 1968 (when Westminster Bank merged with National Provincial to form NatWest), and was then seconded for three years to Orion Bank, a consortium of NatWest and international shareholders.

In 1975, he became managing director of the group's leasing arm, Lombard North Central, and in 1978 he was placed in charge of all NatWest's subsidiaries.

He became deputy chief executive in 1980 and chief executive in 1983. In 1986, NatWest became the first British bank with annual profits over £1 billion. In 1987, Wilkinson became a deputy chairman.

Later that year he took up the position of chair of investment banking. This included the merchant bank County NatWest, which in August 1987 became manager and lead underwriter for the public offering of Blue Arrow, an employment agency, which collapsed in a scandal. When the share issue closed in late September, only 38% of the shares had been subscribed; in order to declare the issue successful, County NatWest and stockbrokers Philips & Drew concealed another 13% in their own books, and were left holding the shares when the market crashed in October.

Wilkinson was asked to produce an internal report. The report was critical, but was later found by the Department of Trade and Industry and the Bank of England to have underplayed the seriousness of the actions, and calls rose for his resignation (although it was not suggested at any time that he had been involved in the scandal). He resigned as chairman of what was by then NatWest Investment Bank in 1989.

== Latter life ==
He suffered a heart attack in August 1989. He remained a group deputy chairman of Natwest until the following year.

In his later years, he also served as a director of British Aerospace, National Power and the English National Opera, a vice-president of the Imperial Cancer Research Fund and chairman of the Wishbone Trust.

== Personal life ==
Wilkinson married Eileen Malkin in 1951, who died in 1991. They had a son, who rose to become an admiral in the Royal Navy, and two daughters. He also had six grandchildren.

He was knighted in 1988.
