= Sorbitol-MacConkey agar =

Sorbitol-MacConkey agar is a variant of traditional MacConkey agar used in the detection of E. coli O157:H7. Traditionally, MacConkey agar has been used to distinguish those bacteria that ferment lactose from those that do not. This is important because gut bacteria, such as Escherichia coli, can typically ferment lactose, while important gut pathogens, such as Salmonella enterica and most shigellas are unable to ferment lactose. Shigella sonnei can ferment lactose, but only after prolonged incubation, so it is referred to as a late-lactose fermenter.

During fermentation of the sugar, acid is formed and the pH of the medium drops, changing the color of the pH indicator. Different formulations use different indicators; neutral red is often used. For example, lactose fermenters turn a deep red when this pH indicator is used. Those bacteria unable to ferment lactose, often referred to as nonlactose fermenters, or NLFs for short, use the peptone in the medium. This releases ammonia, which raises the pH of the medium. Although some authors refer to NLFs as being colourless, in reality they turn neutral red a buffish color.

E. coli O157:H7 differs from most other strains of E. coli in being unable to ferment sorbitol. In sorbitol-MacConkey agar, lactose is replaced by sorbitol. Non-pathogenic strains of E. coli ferment sorbitol to produce acid: Pathogenic E. coli cannot ferment sorbitol, so this strain uses peptone to grow. This raises the pH of the medium, allowing the pathogenic strain to be differentiated from other non-pathogenic E.coli strains through the action of the pH indicator in the medium.
