= Ralph Kekwick =

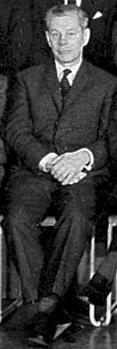
R.A. Kekwick

Professor Ralph Ambrose Kekwick FRS (11 November 1908 in Leytonstone Essex – 17 January 2000 in Woodford). was a British biochemist who did pioneering work on human plasma fractionation, including the first production of Factor VIII.

== Early life and education ==
Ralph's father was Oliver A. Kekwick (1865–1939) a managing clerk in a firm of ships' chandlers in Royal Albert Dock, London. His mother was Mary E. Price (1868–1958) who, aged 13, was a pupil-teacher at Bromley St Leonard's Church school, Bromley-by-Bow, London. Ralph was the youngest of her three children.

Ralph attended infants' and elementary schools in Leytonstone and in 1919 gained a scholarship to Leyton County High School for boys. His elder brother read chemistry at University College London (UCL) and his accounts of this excited Ralph and set him for a career in science.

At age 16, Ralph passed the School Certificate sufficiently to make him eligible for university entrance and he began at UCL in 1925, a month before his 17th birthday. He obtained a BSc with first class in chemistry in 1928.

== Career ==
=== 1920s ===
UCL did not then run undergraduate courses in biochemistry but did have a small biochemistry department headed by Prof. Sir Jack Drummond (FRS 1944). In 1928 Drummond gave a series of open lectures which Kekwick attended and decided as a result to pursue a career in biochemistry. He stayed at UCL doing work which included the hydrogen-ion dissociation curve of the crystalline albumin of the hen's egg.

=== 1930s ===
In 1931 he was awarded a Commonwealth Fund Harkness Fellowship which enabled him to spend two years in the United States. He joined Keith Cannan and resumed work on egg albumin and later published two papers in the Biochemical Journal. He returned to UCL as a lecturer from 1933 to 1937, spending a year at the Physical Chemical Institute in Uppsala, Sweden from 1935 to 1937 doing work with Nobel laureate Theodor Svedberg on analytical ultracentrifugation. In 1935 a grant of £3,400 to the Lister Institute of Preventive Medicine in London was made by the Rockefeller Foundation to acquire an oil turbine and equilibrium ultracentrifuge from the Swedish institute. A special building housed the equipment because of the closeness of the Thames and the need to protect other equipment from vibration. Kekwick assisted with the installation and in 1937 a Medical Research Council (MRC) grant supported him working at the Lister where he was offered a post. In 1938, Svedberg attended the opening of the new Lister Institute Biophysics Building. A steady flow of research papers based on ultracentrifugal measurements followed and in 1941, in recognition of his contributions to the physicochemical characterisation of proteins, Kekwick was awarded a DSc degree by London University of which the Lister was a part.

In the summer of 1939 he left for the USA with his wife and daughter (born 1938) to visit his wife's family and attend the Third Microbiological Congress in New York during which war was declared in Europe. His wife and daughter stayed on with her family while he returned to the UK – his wife and daughter did not return until 1944.

=== 1940s ===
On his return to the Lister he continued experiments on diphtheria antitoxic horse sera. In 1940, Sir Percival Hartley, head of the Medical Research Council Biological Standards Division, raised problems with serum and plasma for transfusion. On storage, sterile human serum developed a haze owing to liberation of lipid from serum lipoprotein. This was visually indistinguishable from bacterial contamination. A method was found to produce a clear, filterable, stable product.

There was also a need for stocks of dried plasma or serum that could be reconstituted in emergencies. In 1941 Ralph moved to the unoccupied London County Council Serum Institute at Carshalton to avoid the London bombing. During 1942–43 the ether-freeze treatment of human serum and plasma was expanded and 1,000 litres of serum and 2,500 litres of plasma were produced and used clinically. More work was done on human plasma fractionation between 1944 and 1954.

=== 1950s – retirement ===
An expanding demand for dried plasma and plasma protein fractions and a new blood products laboratory was built at the Elstree site.

In 1952 Ralph was appointed Reader in Biophysics in the University of London.

The first effective concentrate of human Factor VIII was produced and used successfully and reported in The Lancet in 1957. Kekwick received the Oliver Memorial Award for outstanding contributions to blood transfusion.

In 1966 Kekwick was given a personal Chair in the University of London and was elected a Fellow of The Royal Society (FRS).

== Personal life ==
He met his future wife Barbara Stone, a graduate in English from Wells College, whilst in New York in the 1930s. They married in June 1933. He retired in 1971 as his wife was unwell following post-operative complications – she died 18 months later. In 1974 he married his former colleague at the Lister, Margaret Mackay, who later died suddenly in 1982.
