= Arnold Ashley Miles =

British microbiologist

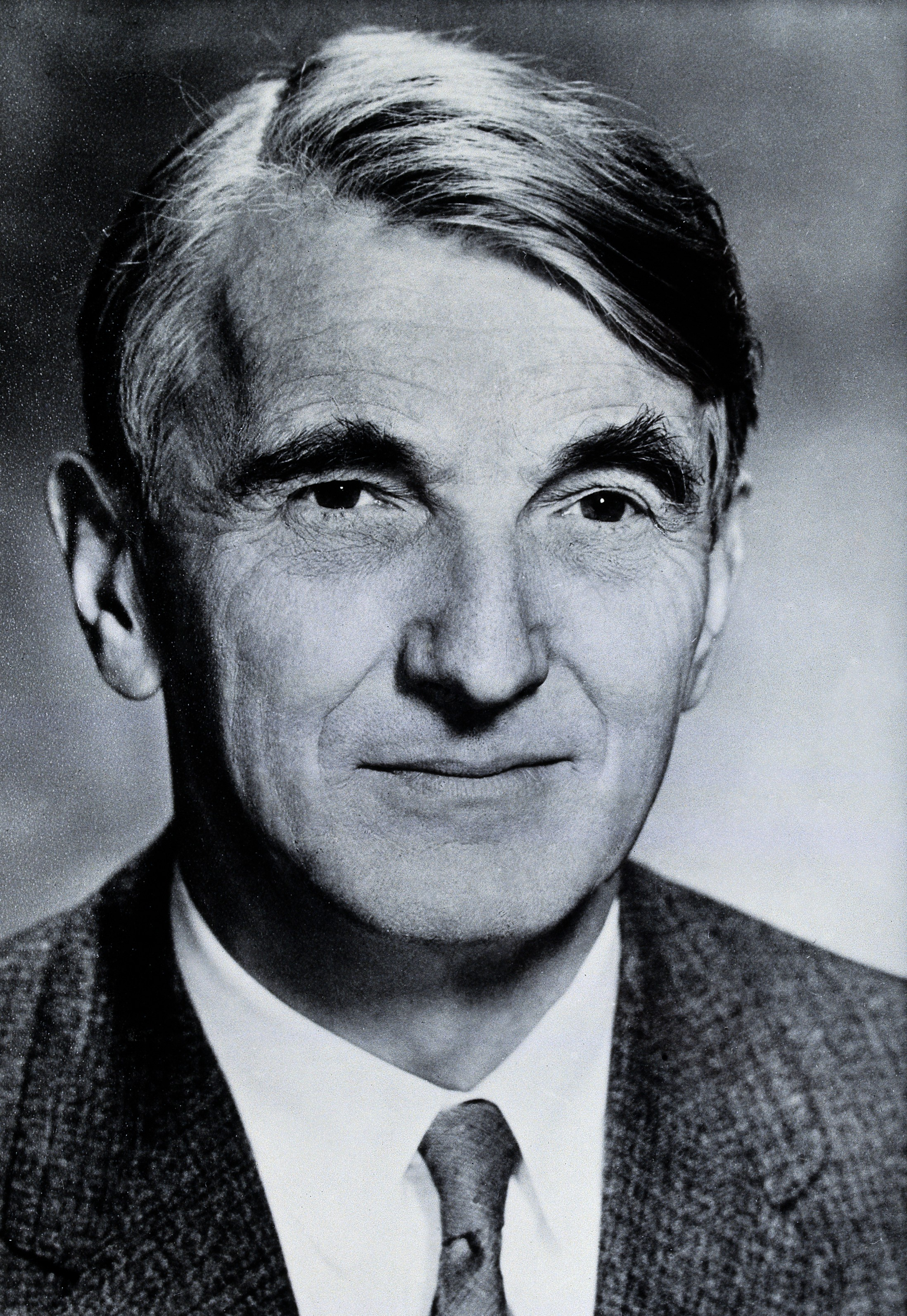
Portrait. Credit: Wellcome Collection

Sir Arnold Ashley Miles CBE FRS (20 March 1904 – 11 February 1988) was the Director of the Lister Institute of Preventive Medicine and Professor of Experimental Pathology in the University of London from 1952 to 1971.

== Early life ==
He was born in York, Yorkshire, England. He was the second of three children and only son of Harry Miles, a draper, and his wife, Kate Elizabeth Hindley. He was educated at Bootham School, a Quaker foundation in York. However, from the age of 12, no amount of persuasion would make him conform to religious observance which he found unacceptable. From there he won an exhibition to King's College, Cambridge, to read medicine. He qualified MRCS, LRCP in 1928 at St Bartholomew's Hospital, London and, in 1929, at a relatively early age, obtained MRCP and in 1937 FRCP.

== Career ==
In 1929, he became demonstrator at the London School of Hygiene and Tropical Medicine and began to develop a career in microbiology particularly immunity. In 1931 he returned to Cambridge, as a demonstrator becoming reader at the British Postgraduate Medical School based in Hammersmith, London (now part of Imperial College, London). In 1937, he was appointed to the chair of bacteriology at University College Hospital Medical School, London. During the Second World War he continued as professor and was also a pathologist in the Emergency Medical Service. He was also director of the Medical Research Council's wound infection unit in Birmingham and produced effective recommendations for their control.

In 1946, he was appointed deputy director of the National Institute for Medical Research and head of its department of biological standards. His research concerned the mechanisms of inflammation and immunity.

From 1952–1971, he was director of the Lister Institute of Preventive Medicine. In 1952 he also became MD and professor of experimental pathology at London University. He was elected FRS in 1961. In total he published over 140 papers on his work and was joint editor of five editions of Topley and Wilson's Principles of Bacteriology and Immunity.

After retirement from the Lister in 1971, he continued to work, even after a stroke, till his death.

== Personal life ==
He was appointed CBE in 1953 and received a knighthood in 1966. Other awards included honorary FRCP in 1969 and fellowships of King's College, Cambridge, the Institute of Biology, the Infectious Diseases Society of America and the Royal Society of Medicine.

In 1930 he married a medical laboratory technician, Ellen Marguerite Dahl (1903-1988) who was the half-sister of the writer Roald Dahl. They had no children. Miles died at his home, 7 Holly Place, Hampstead, London.
