= Proceedings of the Nutrition Society =

- Discipline: Nutrition and dietetics
- Language: English
- Edited by: Professor Alison Gallagher

Publication details
- Publisher: Cambridge University Press (United Kingdom)
- Frequency: Quarterly
- Impact factor: 6.297 (2020)

Standard abbreviations
- ISO 4: Proc. Nutr. Soc.

Indexing
- ISSN: 0029-6651

Links
- Journal homepage

Proceedings of the Nutrition Society is one of the publications by The Nutrition Society and is a scientific research journal which focuses on "the scientific study of nutrition and its application to the maintenance of human and animal health".

The journal was founded in 1944, merged with the British Journal of Nutrition in 1947, and was re-established in 1953.
