= Joseph Arthur Arkwright =

English bacteriologist (1864–1944)

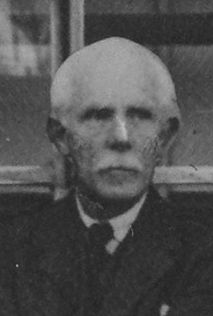
Portrait of Joseph Arthur Arkwright (1933).

Sir Joseph Arthur Arkwright MA MD MRCS FRCP FRS (22 March 1864 – 22 November 1944) was a medical doctor. He was forced to give up his work due to severe dermatitis. He became a bacteriologist and from 1906 joined the Lister Institute of Preventive Medicine, first as a voluntary worker, then as assistant bacteriologist from 1908.

== Early life and education ==
He was born at Thurlaston, Leicestershire, England, the youngest of the five children of Arthur William Arkwright, a farmer, of Broughton Hall, Astley, Leicestershire and his wife and second cousin, Emma, daughter of John Wolley, of Beeston, Nottinghamshire. His mother died in 1866. His great-great-grandfather was Sir Richard Arkwright the inventor of textile manufacturing machinery.

He was educated at Wellington College and Trinity College, Cambridge. At Cambridge he took the natural sciences tripos in 1884–6 with zoology his major subject. He completed his medical training at St Bartholomew's Hospital (Barts), London, qualifying in 1889.

== Career ==
He held posts at Barts and later at the West London Hospital in Hammersmith and the Victoria Hospital for Children, in Fulham. Later he settled in general practice at Halesowen, then in Worcestershire, now part of the West Midlands. However, after he suffered severe dermatitis and was forced to give up general practice.

In 1906 he joined the Lister Institute of Preventive Medicine, first as a voluntary worker, then as assistant bacteriologist from 1908. His early work considered the spread of diphtheria in schools and the differentiation of meningococcus strains. In 1915 he studied an epidemic of cerebrospinal meningitis among troops camped on Salisbury Plain. In 1915 during the First World War he joined the Royal Army Medical Corps and was posted to Malta. There he was pathologist in charge of the laboratory at St George's Hospital. He made observations on convalescent carriers in bacillary dysentery and also blackwater fever. In 1918 he was appointed a member of the War Office committee on trench fever. Together with Arthur Bacot and F. Martin Duncan he demonstrated the association of the trench fever virus with Rickettsia quintana in lice.

His most important work was bacterial variation. He noted variants as R and S (rough and smooth) in bacilli of the dysentery and enteric group.

In 1922 he went with Bacot to Cairo to investigate the cause of typhus fever. After two months' work they both contracted the disease. Bacot died, and Arkwright recovered after a long illness.

On return to the Lister, he investigated animal diseases including foot-and-mouth. From 1925 onwards he was a member of the Ministry of Agriculture's committee on the disease. He became its chairman in 1931.

He was a member of the Medical Research Council from 1930 to 1934 and the Agricultural Research Council from 1931 to 1940. He was chairman of the committee on Brucella abortus infection and on Johne's disease (Paratuberculosis). He also chaired the joint committee on tuberculosis.

He retired from the Lister in 1927 but continued to work as an honorary member and represented the Royal Society on the Lister governing body from 1932 to 1944. He had produced over fifty papers on bacteriology and immunology.

== Honours ==
He was appointed FRCP in 1916, FRS in 1926, and was knighted in 1937. He died in King's College Hospital, south London.

== Personal life ==
In 1893, he married Ruth (d. 1950), daughter of Joseph William Wilson, a civil engineer. They had three daughters, two of whom became doctors.

== Publications ==
The Carrier Problem in Infectious Diseases Authors: John Charles Grant Ledingham FRS and Joseph Arkwright: Original publication c.1923 ISBN 1116754967 ISBN 978-1116754964
