= Harriette Chick =

British microbiologist, protein scientist and nutritionist

Dame Harriette Chick DBE FRSM
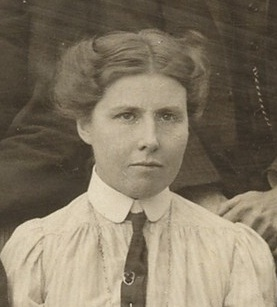
- Born: 6 January 1875; London, England
- Died: 9 July 1977 (aged 102); Cambridge, England
- Education: University College London

Dame Harriette Chick DBE (6 January 1875 – 9 July 1977) was a British microbiologist, protein scientist, and nutritionist. She is best remembered for demonstrating the roles of sunlight and cod liver oil in preventing rickets. She also greatly contributed to the medical and public community as she discovered the origins of a number of diseases, including rickets and pellagra, and was a co-discoverer of the standard Chick-Martin test for disinfectants.

== Biography ==
=== Early life and education ===
She was born in London, England, on 6 January 1875, the fifth child of six daughters and four sons of Samuel Chick and Emma Hooley, a Methodist family. Her father owned property and sold lace. The Chick children were brought up strictly with no frivolities and regular attendance at family prayers. All seven girls attended Notting Hill High School, a girls' school thought to be outstanding for its teaching in the sciences. While there, the principle encouraged the inclusion of science as part of the core education. Subsequently, six of the sisters, including Harriette, continued to study for university degrees. Another of them, Frances Wood, became a notable statistician. Harriette was enrolled at Bedford College and then as a science student at University College London in 1894, and then proceeded to obtain her doctorate in bacteriology at the same university in 1904.

=== Death ===
She died in Cambridge, England, in 1977, aged 102.

== Work ==
=== Early research on sewage disposal and mechanisms of disinfection ===
During the years 1898–1901, an award from the Royal Commission for the Exhibition of 1851 enabled her to undertake research with Prof Max von Gruber in the Institute for Hygiene in Vienna and with Prof Rubert Boyce in University College, Liverpool. In 1902, she was appointed as assistant to Dr AC Houston, Chief Bacteriologist to the Royal Commission on Sewage Disposal. In 1903, she returned to work with Gruber after his move to Munich in 1902. In 1904, she was awarded a DSc from London University for her work on green algae in polluted waters. In 1905, at the suggestion of Charles Scott Sherrington, she applied for the Jenner Memorial Research Studentship at the Lister Institute, which was the only medical research institute in Britain at the time and had been established in1891 as a private charity . Her application raised several objections as no woman had been bestowed the fellowship previously. And in 1905, Harriette became the first woman to obtain a position at the Lister Institute of Prevention Medicine. Her relationship with the Lister was long. Employed until 1945 with the institute, she was an honorary staff member thereafter for 25 years.

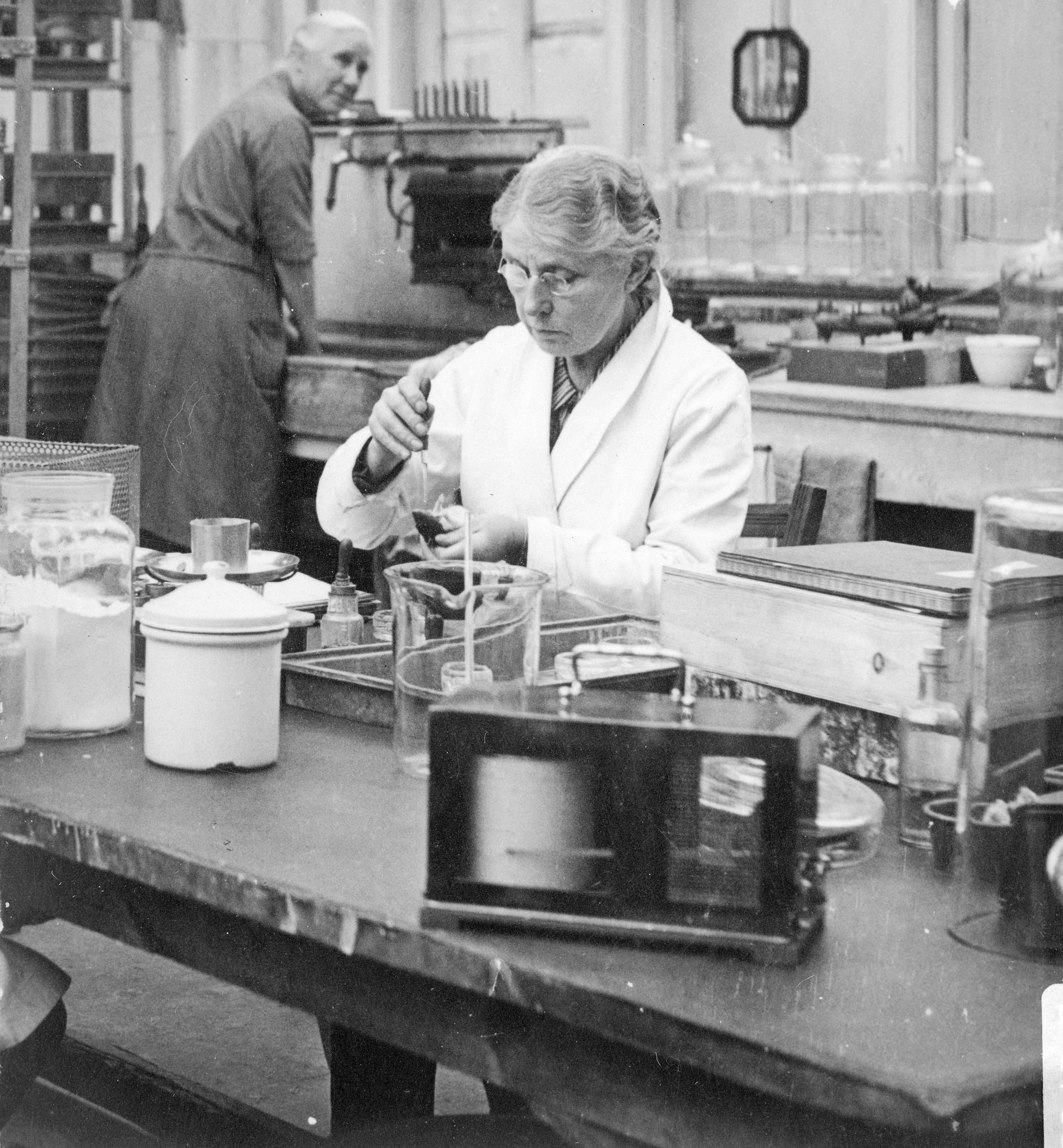
Harriette Chick in the conservatory animal house at Roebuck House

Chick and Lister Institute director Charles James Martin discovered that the process of protein denaturation was distinct from protein coagulation (or flocculation), beginning the modern understanding of protein folding. She is known for having formulated Chick's Law in 1908, giving the relationship between the kill efficiency of organisms and contact time with a disinfectant. Chick's Law was later modified by H. E. Watson in 1908 to include the coefficient of specific lethality. The Chick-Watson Equation is still used. A new and, at the time, more realistic test for the effectiveness of disinfectants, the Chick-Martin test, was also devised and named for the two collaborators.

=== Experience as an early woman scientist ===
In 1909, Chick was a cosignatory to a letter to The Times newspaper from a group of women graduates of the University of London calling for them to be allowed to vote for the Member of Parliament returned by their university. In 1913, she was one of the first three women to be admitted to the Biochemical Society following its renaming and change of policy on the admission of women.

=== Work at the Lister Institute during and immediately after the First World War: transition to nutritional studies. ===
In 1915, she briefly went to the Lister Institute in Elstree to test and bottle tetanus antitoxin for the army and to develop the first disinfectants aimed at specific microorganisms. She returned to the Chelsea building, however, to prepare agglutinating sera for the diagnosis of typhoid and related diseases in troops. Subsequently, however, she commenced studies on rectifying nutritional deficiencies in the wartime diets of both the native population and overseas forces. Initially, this involved surveys of the ability of various foodstuffs to counter scurvy and beriberi. In 1919, together with Dr. Elsie Dalyell, she led a team, including Margaret Hume and Hannah Henderson Smith, from the Lister Institute and the Medical Research Council (United Kingdom) to study the relation of nutrition to childhood bone disease in post-war Vienna. They discovered the nutritional factor causing rickets and proved that fat-soluble vitamins present in cod liver oil, or exposure to ultraviolet light, could cure and prevent rickets in children.

Chick was appointed Head of a new nutrition section at the Lister Institute and continued with her research on rickets and, additionally, pellagra. The department was relocated to the Cambridge house of the Lister director, CJ Martin, during the Second World War.

== Honours and distinctions ==
She served as secretary of the League of Nations health section committee on the physiological bases of nutrition from 1934 to 1937. In 1941, she was a founding member of the Nutrition Society, of which she served as president from 1956 to 1959. She was appointed CBE in 1932 and subsequently Dame Commander of the British Empire in 1949. In 1960, she received an honorary fellowship of the Royal Society of Medicine. In 1918, she was elected to the Physiological Society. She served as Secretary of the Accessory Food Factors Committee of the Medical Research Council from 1918 to 1945.
