= Scopula modicaria =

Scientific classification
- Domain: Eukaryota
- Kingdom: Animalia
- Phylum: Arthropoda
- Class: Insecta
- Order: Lepidoptera
- Family: Geometridae
- Genus: Scopula
- Species: S. modicaria

Binomial name
- Scopula modicaria (Leech, 1897)

Synonyms
- Acidalia modicaria Leech, 1897; Acidalia virginaria Imaidzumi, 1941

Species of geometer moth in subfamily Sterrhinae

Scopula modicaria is a moth of the family Geometridae. It was described by John Henry Leech in 1897. It is found in China, the Russian Far East, Korea and Japan.

The wingspan is 19–30 millimetres (0.75–1.18 in).
