= Charles Hunter Stewart =

Scottish physician

Charles Hunter Stewart FSA Scot FRSE (29 September 1854 – 30 June 1924) was a Scottish physician and public health expert.

Born in Edinburgh, Stewart studied medicine at the University of Edinburgh. In 1884 he became an assistant at the Laboratory of Public Health in Edinburgh under Henry Littlejohn.

In 1888 he was elected a Fellow of the Royal Society of Edinburgh. His proposers were Sir Andrew Douglas Maclagan, Sir William Turner, Alexander Crum Brown and Peter Guthrie Tait. He was then living at 2 Bellevue Terrace.

In 1898 he became Professor of Public Health at the University of Edinburgh

In 1900 he was living at 9 Learmonth Gardens in Edinburgh's West End.

He died at age 69.

== Family ==
He married twice, firstly in 1888 to Ann Maria Gibson (d.1905), and after her death, in 1912 he married Agnes Millar McGibbon Somers, daughter of Robert Somers of Stirling.
