= International Union of Nutritional Sciences =

Organization

- Abbreviation: IUNS
- Formation: 1946; 80 years ago
- Type: INGO
- Location: London, United Kingdom
- Region served: Worldwide
- Official language: English
- President: Hyun-Sook Kim
- Parent organization: International Science Council
- Website: IUNS Official website

The International Union of Nutritional Sciences (IUNS) is an international non-governmental organization established in 1946 devoted to the advancement of nutrition. Its mission and objectives are:

- To promote advancement in nutrition science, research, and development through international cooperation at the global level.
- To encourage communication and collaboration among nutrition scientists as well as to disseminate information in nutritional science through modern communication technology.

Since its 1946 foundation, the membership has grown to include 85 national adhering bodies and 17 affiliations.

== IUNS International Congresses ==
IUNS International Congresses
Year	City	Country	Number of Delegates	Countries Attending
1948	London	United Kingdom	22	13
1952	Basel	Switzerland	150	18
1954	Amsterdam	Netherlands	360	32
1957	Paris	France	1000	22
1960	Washington, D.C.	United States	2000	65
1963	Edinburgh	United Kingdom	1500	63
1966	Hamburg	West Germany	2100	81
1969	Prague	Czechoslovakia	1800	62
1972	Mexico City	Mexico	2000	66
1975	Kyoto	Japan	2300	55
1978	Rio de Janeiro	Brazil	3500	92
1981	San Diego	United States	2500	83
1985	Brighton	United Kingdom	2300	92
1989	Seoul	South Korea	3500	104
1993	Adelaide	Australia	2600	91
1997	Montreal	Canada	3250	92
2001	Vienna	Austria	3550	113
2005	Durban	South Africa	2100	92
2009	Bangkok	Thailand	4070	106
2013	Granada	Spain	3896	
2017	Buenos Aires	Argentina	3038	
2022	Tokyo	Japan	Originally scheduled for 2021, postponed until 2022	
2025	Paris	France		
2029	Vancouver	Canada		

== Governing Council ==
The Council consists of five Officers, the President, President-Elect, Vice-President, Secretary-General, Treasurer, Immediate Past-President, and six Council members.

IUNS's current council consists of the following:

- President: Hyun-Sook Kim Korea;
- Vice President: Francis Zotor Ghana;
- President Elect: Jacques Delarue France;
- Secretary General: Edith Feskens Netherlands;
- Treasurer: Welma Stonehouse Australia;
- Member: Amos Laar Ghana;
- Member: Hardinsyah Indonesia;
- Member: Zhaoping Li United States;
- Member: Gladys Morales Chile;
- Member: Ngozi Nnam Nigeria;
- Member: Philip Calder UK;
- Immediate Past-President: Lynnette M. Neufeld Canada.

== Headquarters ==
IUNS is registered in London, United Kingdom.

== Secretariat ==
IUNS; The Nutrition Society; Boyd Orr House, 10 Cambridge Court; 210 Shepherds Bush Road; London; UK; W6 7NJ
