= Arthur Harden =

British biochemist (1865–1940)

Sir Arthur Harden FRS
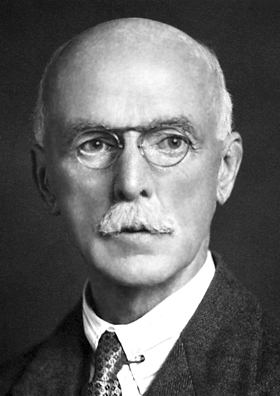
- Born: 12 October 1865; Manchester, Lancashire, England, United Kingdom
- Died: 17 June 1940 (aged 74); Bourne End, Buckinghamshire, England, UK
- Education: Owens College (now University of Manchester) (MSc), University of Erlangen (PhD)
- Known for: Harden–Young ester, chemistry of the yeast cell
- Spouse: Georgina Sydney Bridge
- Awards: Nobel Prize in Chemistry (1929); Davy Medal (1935)
- Scientific career
- Fields: Biochemistry
- Workplaces: Lister Institute, Victoria University
- Doctoral advisor: Otto Fischer
- Doctoral students: Roland Victor Norris; Ida Maclean

Sir Arthur Harden, FRS (12 October 1865 – 17 June 1940) was a British biochemist. He shared the Nobel Prize in Chemistry in 1929 with Hans Karl August Simon von Euler-Chelpin for their investigations into the fermentation of sugar and fermentative enzymes. He was a founding member of the Biochemical Society and editor of the Biochemical Journal for 25 years.

== Biography ==
=== Early years ===
Harden was born to Scottish Presbyterian businessman Albert Tyas Harden and Eliza Macalister. His early education was at a private school in Victoria Park run by Dr Ernest Adam. He went to study in 1877 at Tettenhall College, Staffordshire, and entered Owens College, now the University of Manchester, in 1882, graduating in 1885. He studied chemistry under Professor Roscoe at Owens College and was influenced by J.B. Cohen (author of The Owens College Course of Practical Organic Chemistry).

=== Research ===
In 1886 Harden was awarded the Dalton Scholarship in Chemistry and spent a year working with Otto Fischer at Erlangen where he worked on the synthesis of β-nitroso-α-naphthylamine and studied its properties. After receiving a Ph.D. he returned to Manchester as a lecturer and demonstrator and taught along with Sir Philip Hartog. He researched the life and work of John Dalton during these years. In 1895 he wrote a textbook on Practical Organic Chemistry together with F.C. Garrett. Harden continued to work at Manchester until 1897 when he was appointed chemist to the newly founded British Institute of Preventive Medicine, which later became the Lister Institute. He earned the degree Doctor of Science (D.Sc.) from the Victoria University (which included Owens College) in June 1902. Five years later, in 1907 he was appointed Head of the Biochemical Department, a position which he held until his retirement in 1930 (though he continued his scientific work at the Institute after his retirement).

At Manchester, Harden had studied the action of light on mixtures of carbon dioxide and chlorine, and when he entered the Institute he applied his methods to the investigation of biological phenomena such as the chemical action of bacteria and alcoholic fermentation. He studied the breakdown products of glucose and the chemistry of the yeast cell, and produced a series of papers on the antiscorbutic and anti-neuritic vitamins.

Harden was knighted in 1926, and received several honorary doctorates. A Fellow of the Royal Society, he received the Davy Medal in 1935.

==== "Harden–Young ester" ====
Harden's work on glycolysis in yeast with William John Young led to the discovery of a phosphorylated ester that was known as Harden–Young ester until chemical analysis showed it to be fructose 1,6-bisphosphate. It is now known to be the product of phosphorylating fructose 6-phosphate by the action of phosphofructokinase; it is broken down into glyceraldehyde 3-phosphate and dihydroxyacetone phosphate by the action of aldolase.

=== Personal life ===
Harden married Georgina Sydney Bridge (died January 1928) in 1900 and they had no children. He was elected to membership of the Manchester Literary and Philosophical Society on 14 April 1896

== See also ==
- William John Young
