= British Journal of Nutrition =

- Discipline: Nutrition
- Language: English
- Edited by: Prof John Mathers

Publication details
- History: 1947-present
- Publisher: Cambridge University Press on behalf of The Nutrition Society (United Kingdom)
- Frequency: Biweekly
- Impact factor: 3.6 (2022)

Standard abbreviations
- ISO 4: Br. J. Nutr.

Indexing
- CODEN: BJNUAV
- ISSN: 0007-1145 (print); 1475-2662 (web)
- LCCN: 53017329
- OCLC no.: 647391056

Links
- Journal homepage; Online access; Online archive

The British Journal of Nutrition is a peer-reviewed scientific journal covering research on animal and human nutrition. It was established in 1947 and is published by Cambridge University Press on behalf of The Nutrition Society. The editor-in-chief is Professor John Mathers of Newcastle University. According to the Journal Citation Reports, the journal has a 2022 impact factor of 3.6.
