= Royal Commission on Sewage Disposal =

The Royal Commission on Sewage Disposal was established by the British government in 1898 to report on:

(1) What method or methods of treating and disposing of sewage (including any liquid from any factory, or manufacturing process) may properly be adopted, consistently with due regard for the requirements of the existing law, for the protection of the public health, and for the economical and efficient discharge of the duties of local, authorities; and
(2) If more than one method may be so adopted, by what rules, in relation to the nature or volume of sewage, or the population to be served, or other varying circumstances or requirements, should the particular method of treatment and disposal to be adopted be determined

The commission convened and re-convened eight times under three different reigns, Victoria, Edward VII and King George V, and remained active until 1912 and in that period published nine reports.

- The first report (Cd. 685), published in 1901, was an interim report setting out the initial findings of the commission.
- The second report (Cd. 1178), published in 1902, was an appendix of scientific papers to the first report.
- The third report (Cd. 1486), published in 1903, dealt with the relationship between Local Authorities and manufacturers that disposed of their waste into rivers and tidal waters and pointed out the great inconsistencies in the way that local authorities operated to control pollution.
- The fourth report (Cd. 1883), published in 1904, dealt specifically with the discharge of waste into tidal waters
- The fifth report (Cd. 4278), published in 1908, dealt with the merits of different ways of treating domestic sewage.
- The sixth report (Cd. 4511), published in 1909, dealt with the methods of dealing with brewery waste. The commission had established a piece of practical research into this problem and reported on its outcome.
- The seventh report (Cd. 5542), published in 1911, dealt with the proliferation of green seaweed in polluted estuaries and in particular Belfast Lough.
- The eight report (Cd. 6464), published in 1912, dealt with the standards that should apply to sewage discharges to rivers and tidal waters and specified concentrations of constituents that should not be exceeded.
- The ninth report (Cd. 7819), published in 1912, made similar recommendations with regard to manufacturing waste by type. Also within this report further recommendations were made including provisions for giving powers of entry, general changes to the law and for the discharge of waste waters from mines.
- The 10th and final report, published in 1915, summarised the findings of the previous reports and made proposals for the establishment of river boards across England and Wales to complement the three (the West Riding of Yorkshire Rivers Board, the Mersey and Irwell Joint Committee, and the Ribble Joint Committee) already in existence.

The findings of the commission were to be used to enact legislation to control sewage and manufacturing pollution of water that continued in force up until the enactment of the Water Act 1974. It was the eighth report of the commission that established the 30:20 standard for sewage effluent that remained the most widely used standard in many parts of the world up till the present.
