= Charles Martin (physiologist) =

British scientist (1866–1955)

Charles Martin FRS
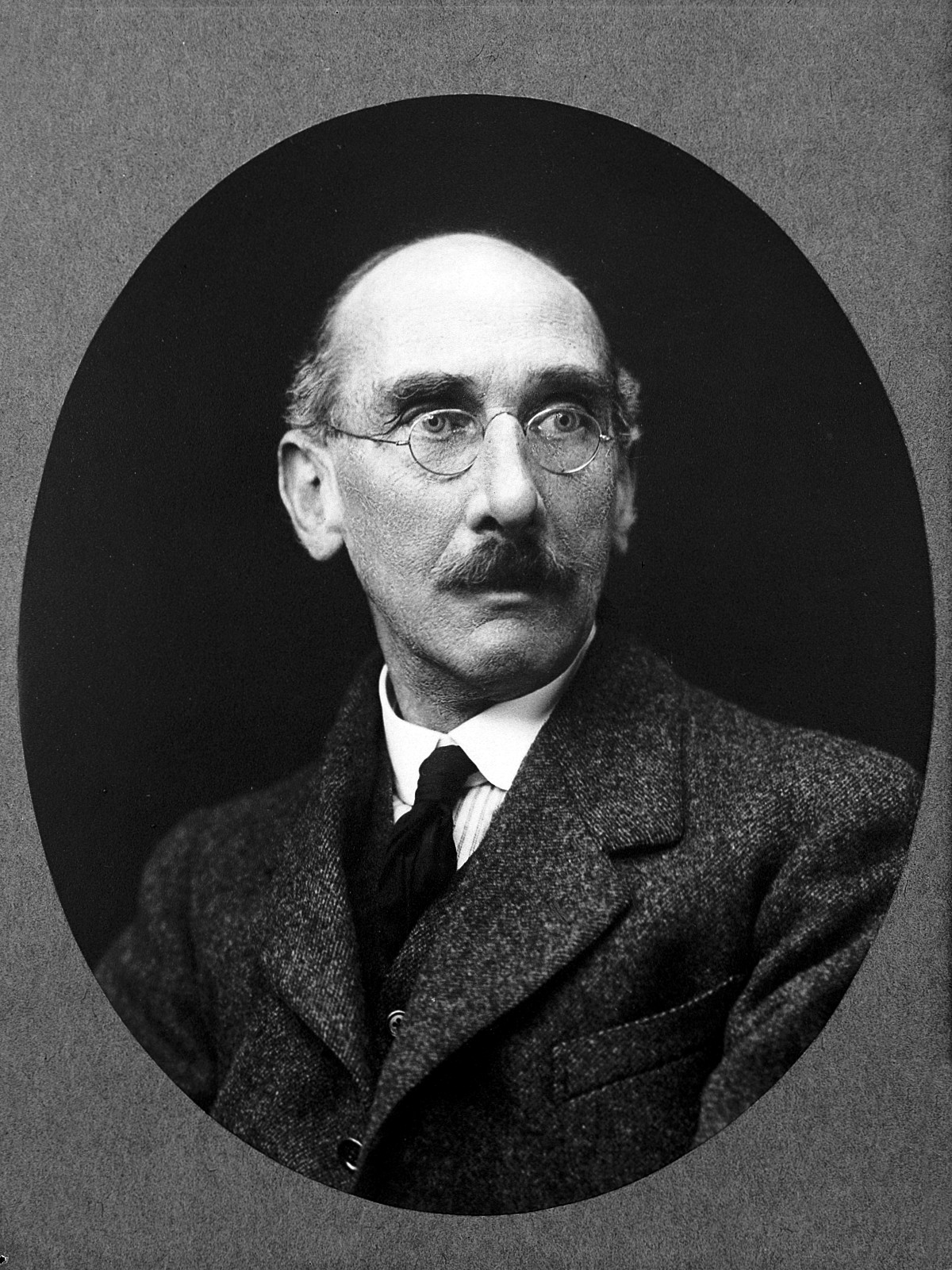
- Born: Charles James Martin; 9 January 1866; Dalston, London, England
- Died: February 15, 1955 (aged 89); Cambridge, Cambridgeshire, England
- Awards: Fellow of the Royal Society; Royal Medal (1923); Croonian Lecture
- Scientific career
- Workplaces: Lister Institute of Preventive Medicine; University of Melbourne

Sir Charles James Martin Kt CMG FRS FRCS (9 January 1866 – 15 February 1955) was a British scientist and director of the Lister Institute of Preventive Medicine, who did seminal work on a wide range of topics including snake toxins, control of body temperature, plague and the way it was spread, dysentery, typhoid and paratyphoid.

== Early life ==
Born in Wilmot House, Dalston, he was the twelfth child of Josiah (an insurance company actuary) and Elizabeth Mary Martin (née Lewis), Charles James was part of an extended family of children from his parents' previous marriages. Being a delicate child, he was sent off to a private boarding school in Hastings.

At 15 he was employed as a junior clerk at the insurance firm where his father worked. He studied mathematics as a requirement for a future as actuary, but showed no special aptitude. Browsing through the numerous bookshops in the area, he came across a secondhand copy of "A Hundred Experiments in Chemistry for One Shilling." Carrying out these experiments, he was sufficiently inspired to entreat his father to allow him to pursue a career in science. He accordingly took evening classes at King's College, London. He then studied medicine at St Thomas's Hospital and spent some time in Leipzig studying physiology under Karl Ludwig.

== Career ==
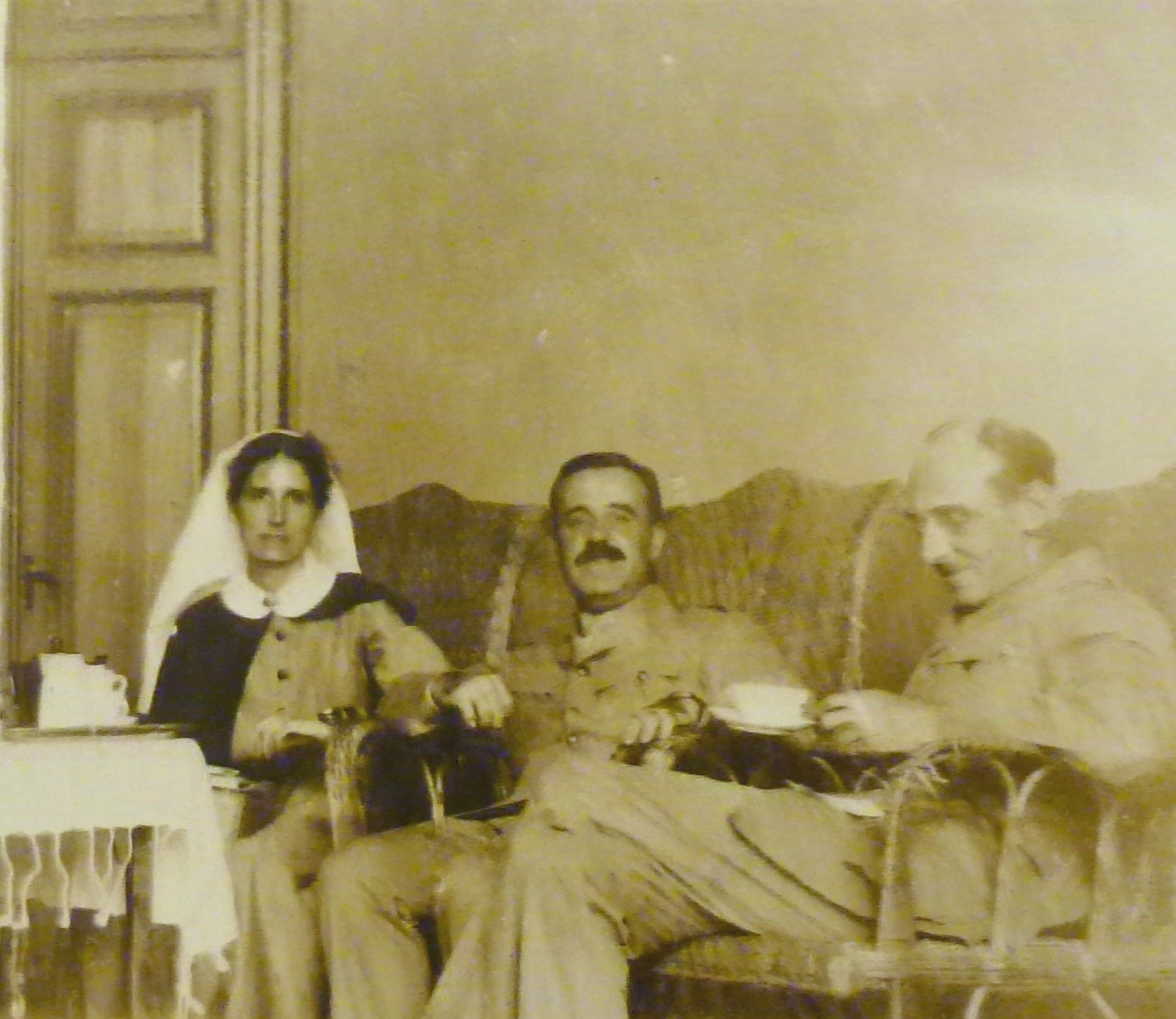
Sister Florence Elizabeth McMillan, Dr Anderson in the centre and Sir Charles James Martin on the right

In 1891 he accepted a post as lecturer at Sydney University, before moving to the University of Melbourne as acting Professor of Physiology. He remained in Australia for 12 years, after which he returned to the UK to become the first Director of the Lister Institute of Preventive Medicine.

He was elected a Fellow of the Royal Society in 1901. His candidacy citation read:

Professor of Physiology in the University of Melbourne. Is eminently distinguished as an original investigator in Physiology. His chief original papers deal with the Chemistry and Physiology Action of Snake Venom, and with the action and reaction of Toxins and Antitoxins. Author of: – 'The Chemistry of the Venom of the Australian Black Snake' (Proc Roy Soc, NSW, 1892); 'The Physiology Action of the Venom of the Australian Black Snake' (ibid, 1895); Curative Action of Calmette's Serum against Australian Snakes' (Internat Med Journ, 1897–1898, and Proc Roy Soc, 1898); 'Nature of the Antagonism between Toxins and Antitoxins' (ibid, 1898, joint Author); 'Separation of Colloids and Crystalloids by Filtration' (Journ of Physiology, 1896); 'Observations on the Anatomy of the Muzzel of 'Ornithorhynchus',' with Dr Wilson (Linn Soc, NSW, 1892); 'Observations on the Femoral Gland of 'Ornithorhynchus',' with Dr Tidswell (Linn Soc, NSW, 1894); 'An Investigation into the Effects of the Darling Pea, 'Swainsonia galegifolia' (Agricultural Department of NSW); 'Cerebral Localization in Platypus' (Journ of Physiol, 1899)'

During World War I he served with the Australian Army Medical Corps in Gallipoli, Egypt, and France as a pathologist with the rank of Lieutenant-colonel. He found some cases of enteric fever at Gallipoli were not typhoid, but paratyphoids A and B, and made a vaccine for all three. A memo to his colleagues on the different treatments for amoebic and bacillary dysentery was widely circulated by the army under Martin’s name. In France he organized the integration of decentralized pathology services into the A.A.M.C. After the war he returned to the Lister Institute until his retirement in 1930. He then spent a further two years in Australia as head of the animal nutrition division of the Council of Scientific and Industrial Research in Adelaide. On his return to the UK he went to live at Roebuck House in Old Chesterton, Cambridge, which he equipped as a laboratory. During WWII it was used to rehouse the experimental animals being used for medical studies by the staff of the Lister Institute. In 1934 he undertook an experimental study of the myxoma virus, at Cambridge and on a rabbit-infested island in Pembrokeshire, to show it was both safe and effective to control plagues of rabbits.

He was awarded the Royal Society's Royal Medal in 1923 and delivered the Royal College of Physicians Croonian Lectures in 1930. He was knighted in the 1927 Birthday Honours.

His contributions to the foundation of biological science in Australia were commemorated by the National Health and Medical Research Council, which created the Sir Charles James Martin Overseas Biomedical Fellowships in 1951.

== Personal life ==
Martin married Edith Cross, daughter of Alfred Cross (and aunt of the Lord of Appeal in Ordinary, Geoffrey Cross and the legal scholar Rupert Cross) in 1891. She died 2 March 1954. They had one daughter, Maisie. Martin died 15 February 1955 at Old Chesterton, Cambridge. He is buried in the Parish of the Ascension Burial Ground in Cambridge.
