= Lister Institute of Preventive Medicine =

Former UK research institute

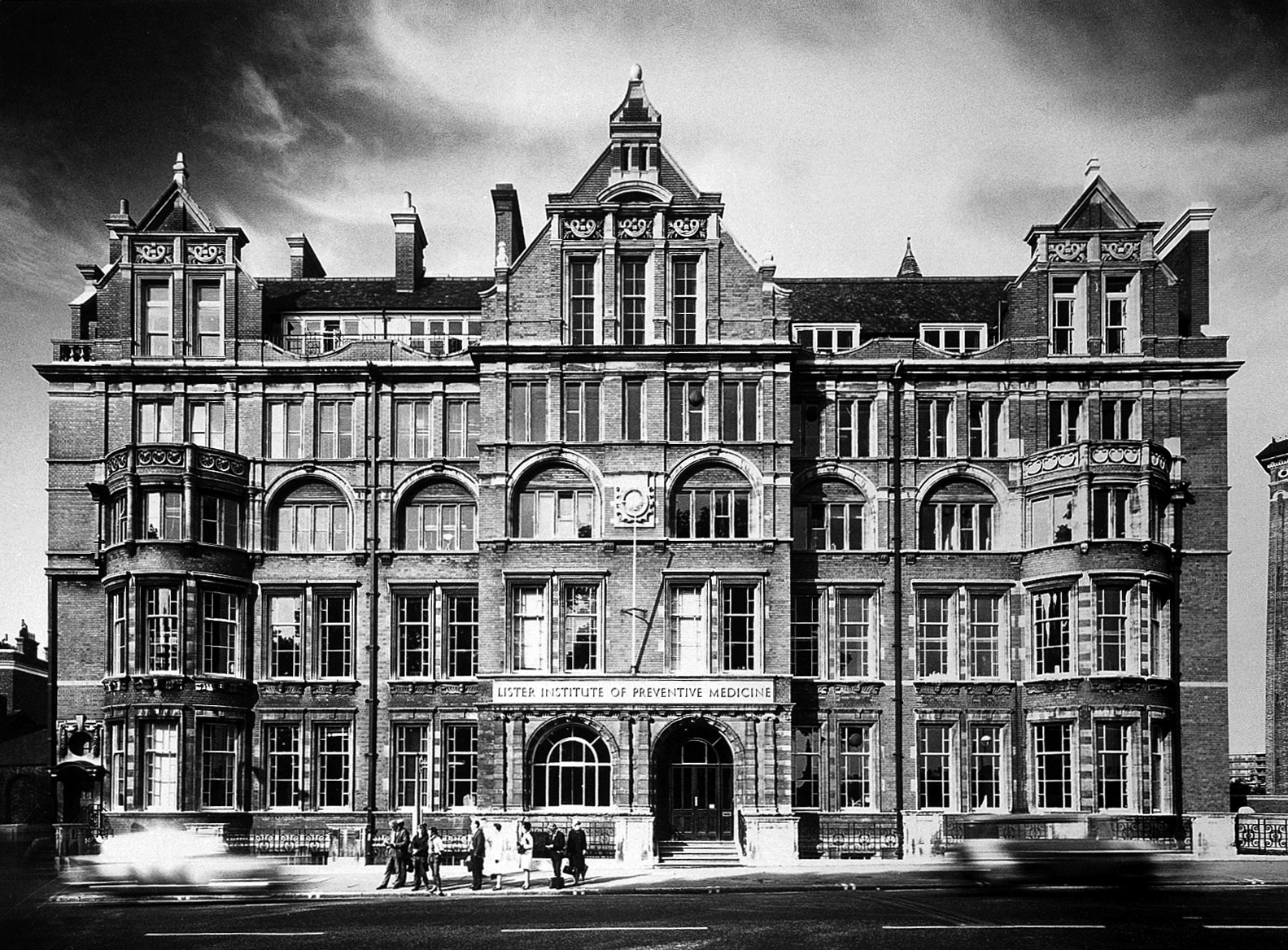
The Lister Institute's building in Chelsea Bridge Road, London, by the architect Alfred Waterhouse; now the private Lister Hospital.

The Lister Institute of Preventive Medicine, informally known as the Lister Institute, was established as a research institute (the British Institute of Preventive Medicine) in 1891, with bacteriologist Marc Armand Ruffer as its first director, using a grant of £250,000 from Edward Cecil Guinness of the Guinness family. It had premises in Chelsea, London; Sudbury, Suffolk; and Elstree, Hertfordshire, England. It was the first medical research charity in the United Kingdom. It was renamed the Jenner Institute (after Edward Jenner, the pioneer of smallpox vaccine) in 1898 and then, in 1903, as the Lister Institute in honour of the great surgeon and medical pioneer, Dr Joseph Lister. In 1905, the institute became a school of the University of London.

== History ==
The early history of the Lister Institute could best be described as chequered. It began with French chemist and microbiologist Louis Pasteur in 1880 when two rabid dogs were brought to Pasteur for examination and it was further two years before Pasteur began to methodically study the disease. By 1885, Pasteur had developed the Rabies vaccine and had tested it on 9-year-old Joseph Meister, on 6 July 1885, after the boy was badly mauled by a rabid dog. Meister recovered, proving the effectiveness of said vaccine.

In April 1886, the British government formed a commission presided by James Paget to enquire about the subject. Several members of the commission visited Pasteur and brought some vaccine back which was tested by Victor Horsley at the University of London and found to be efficacious. The government formed a select committee that reported back in August 1887 with practical advice to muzzle rabid dogs. During that period, the Pasteur Institute in Paris was created. It gradually dawned on the British public and the government that between 1885 and 1889, more than 200 people had been sent to Pasteur for rabies treatment.

On 1 July 1889 a meeting was held in Mansion House, London, presided over by the Mayor James Whitehead and attended by many prominent physicians and scientists including Joseph Lister where it was agreed to send a sum of money to the Pasteur, as an expression of gratitude for his work. Two thousand pounds was raised and forwarded to Pasteur on 6 November 1889. A further discussion was scheduled, leading to the formation of an executive committee where it was decided that an institute should be founded in London, like those in Paris and Berlin. Donations were sought and eighteen months passed. During that period the anti-vivisectionists attempted to prevent the incorporation of the society but failed. The institute was finally incorporated on 5 June 1891.

More than a year passed before sufficient monies could be collected to fund its operation. In early 1893, the council of the Royal College of Surgeons began looking for suitable premises. The institute was first hosted at rooms at the College of State Medicine in Great Russell Street in London between 1893 and 1898 as well as a farm in Sudbury where the diphtheria anti-toxin was developed.

== Modern history ==
Until the 1970s the institute maintained laboratories and conducted research on infectious disease and vaccines. It was funded by manufacturing and selling vaccines.

In the 1970s, the institute ran into financial difficulties. From 1971 to 1972 Professor David Gwynne Evans was the director. The institute had continual annual deficits. Evans was unable to avoid closure of the Chelsea Laboratory and there was the need for major expenditure to modernise the Elstree, Hertfordshire, production facilities. Professor Albert Neuberger became involved as chair of the governing body in 1973–74, at which point he became aware of the difficult financial problems. The endowment funds were insufficient to cover their requirements and it failed to get Government support. Neuberger came to the conclusion that within five to six years it would be bankrupt and he persuaded colleagues to dissolve the institute. He persuaded Westminster Council to change the use of buildings. The Chelsea laboratories were closed in 1975 and Elstree in 1978. The assets were sold, the most valuable being the Chelsea site.

This raised enough money to annually endow a number of Senior Research Fellowships, which is the institute's legacy. From that point it became a science funding body, and it now awards the Lister Institute Research Prize Fellowships to researchers working on biomedical problems in the United Kingdom. The institute's assets in 2010 amounted to about £33m.

== Achievements ==
Staff took considerable risks in early research: investigating plague in India in the early 20th century the method of transmission was established when a female worker put her hand into a flea cage and saw how high the fleas jumped. Joseph Arthur Arkwright FRS (great-grandson of Richard Arkwright) joined the institute in 1906 and studied typhus, amongst other things, by allowing himself to be bitten by infected lice. He survived, two others did not. Other major achievements include:

=== Prior to the First World War ===
These included the physiology of diving; the lethal effect of ultraviolet light on bacteria; fat metabolism; the role of vitamins in nutrition (the term 'vitamine' was coined by Casimir Funk when working at the institute). The institute was significant in helping to set up tuberculosis eradication programmes.

In 1903, Sir Charles James Martin, became the first director of the institute. He made outstanding contributions to the study of plague and its transmission and he created a new post of resident statistician for Major Greenwood, the first of its kind in Britain. Greenwood conducted statistical investigations of tuberculosis, infant mortality and hospital fatality rates. Major also interpreted data from the institute's epidemiological study of bubonic plague in India.

=== First World War ===
Tetanus antiserum production at Elstree was increased. Improved large-scale methods for antisera were introduced by Annie Homer. The bacteria causing gas gangrene of infected wounds were identified.

=== Inter-war years ===
The discovery of co-enzymes by Sir Arthur Harden FRS and his colleagues was recognised by the co-award to him of the Nobel Prize for chemistry in 1929. The institute played a major part in defining the role of vitamins in post-war nutritional deficiency diseases that were widespread in Europe and elsewhere. Emmy Klieneberger-Nobel pioneered the study of mycoplasma and in 1935 discovered and cultured unusual strains of bacteria that lacked a cell wall, naming them L-form bacteria after the institute where she worked. The first director, Sir Charles Martin, appointed in 1903, retired in 1930.

=== Second World War ===
The war made heavy demands on the Lister for production of antisera and vaccines. There was also need for expertise in nutrition. In 1943, Sir Alan Nigel Drury FRS became director serving until 1952. During the war, departments had been widely dispersed. He began a successful reintegration and incorporated some Medical Research Council (MRC) units. As a result, it became a national centre for research on blood transfusion and the provision of blood products for clinical use.

=== Post war to 1970s ===
The institute took some time to settle after wartime upheaval. In 1952 Ashley Miles was appointed as director. The institute remained an important manufacturer of vaccines and antitoxins. It produced the 'triple vaccine' for diphtheria, tetanus and whooping cough (also called pertussis) and vaccines for cholera, typhoid, rabies vaccines and smallpox. It also produced antisera for diphtheria, tetanus, gas gangrene, rabies and scorpion venom. There were also further important research activities:

==== Biochemistry ====
- the role of enzymes in the metabolism of plant and animal carbohydrates was elucidated
- the first synthesis of adenosine triphosphate (ATP) by Alexander Todd PRS in 1949
- the structure of co-enzyme A was defined by James Baddiley, together with other workers at Harvard Medical School and Massachusetts General Hospital
- Discovered that immunological specificity of bacteria is conferred by certain oligosaccharides on their surfaces
- Determined the chemical nature of the human A, B, H and Lewis blood group antigens, their biosynthesis and genetic control

==== Blood and blood products ====
- Invented the ether method for fractionating blood plasma to obtain fibrinogen, thrombin, albumin, immunoglobulins and others for clinical use
- Large-scale production of dried human plasma
- First clinically effective Factor VIII concentrate prepared for the treatment of haemophilia by Ralph Kekwick
- First anti-D immunoglobulin for treating rhesus negative mothers
- Development of radio immunoassay to screen blood for hepatitis B
- Blood group genetics

==== Microbiology and immunology ====
- Established life cycles of trypanosomes (Muriel Robertson FRS).
- Devised a method for identifying the blood meals of insect vectors
- Discovered that sequential mutations in surface antigens hinder development of protective immunity
- First isolations of chlamydias affecting the eye and genital tract
- Discovery of the 'Vi' antigen of Salmonella typhi
- Motility of flagellated salmonella strains used to study phage transduction
- First description of the bacterial sex pilus and exploitation for studying bacterial plasmids, including antibiotic resistance

==== Vaccines and antitoxins ====
- Medical Research Council field trials of pertussis vaccines
- Development of the freeze-dried heat-stable vaccine used in the smallpox eradication programme

==== Nutrition ====
- Demonstration of roles of sunlight and cod liver oil in treating and preventing rickets due to vitamin D deficiency (Dame Harriette Chick).

== Locations ==
=== Elstree ===
The old Elstree site is located off the north-west side of Dagger Lane, off Tylers Way, Bushey, between the Hillfield Park and Aldenham reservoirs in Aldenham Country Park. It was until recently shown on Ordnance Survey maps as the Lister Institute, though more recently the Master Atlas of Greater London (2007) shows it as 'laboratories'. Many of the original buildings still exist including one of the old lodges (Queensbury) and the old stable block. The site now houses the Bio Products Laboratory, formed in 1954, which is the UK national plasma fractionator.

=== Chelsea ===
The British Institute of Preventive Medicine was established in 1891. In 1903, it was renamed The Lister Institute in honour of the great surgeon and medical pioneer, Joseph Lister. This building, along with another adjacent building, forms The Lister Hospital, a private hospital which opened in 1985. The Grade II Listed building is located on Chelsea Bridge Road at its junction with Grosvenor Road and Chelsea Bridge on the north bank of the River Thames which it overlooks.

== Notable Lister Institute Research Fellows ==
- Judy Armitage FRS, Molecular and cellular biochemist
- Arthur William Bacot An entomologist
- Sir Leszek K Borysiewicz FRS, Immunologist and Vice Chancellor of Cambridge University
- Rosa Beddington FRS, Development biologist
- G. Marius Clore FRS, Member of the United States National Academy of Sciences, Molecular biophysicist and structural biologist
- Phillip T. Hawkins FRS, Molecular biologist
- Steven W. J. Homans, FRSE, Structural biologist and Pro-Vice-Chancellor of the Faculty of Science, University of Newcastle
- Christopher A Hunter FRS, Organic chemist
- Sir Alec Jeffreys FRS, Geneticist
- Barry V. L. Potter FMedSci, Medicinal and biological chemist
- Geoffrey L. Smith FRS, Virologist

== Bibliography ==
- Leslie Collier, The Lister Institute of Preventive Medicine: a concise history, Lister Institute of Preventive Medicine, 2000, 66 pages.
- Harriette Chick, Margaret Hume, Marjorie MacFarlane, War on Disease: a history of the Lister Institute, London: A. Deutsch, 1971, ISBN 0-233-96220-4, ISBN 978-0-233-96220-7, 251 pages.

== See also ==
- List of hospitals in England
