= Plimmer =

Plimmer is a surname. Notable people with the surname include:

- Damon Plimmer, New Zealand Anglican priest
- Georgia Plimmer (born 2004), New Zealand cricketer
- Helen Plimmer (born 1965), British cricketer
- Henry George Plimmer (1856/57–1918), British doctor, pathologist, microbiologist and cancer researcher
- James Plimmer (1901 – death unknown), British rugby league footballer
- John Plimmer (1812–1905), British settler and entrepreneur in New Zealand
- Melanie Plimmer, British barrister
- R. H. A. Plimmer (1877–1955), British biochemist and author on vitamins
- Violet Plimmer (1885–1949), British author on vitamins

== See also ==
- Plummer (surname), another surname
- Plommer, another surname
- Plimmer Towers
