= Plommer =

Plommer is a surname. Notable people with the surname include:

- Tommy Plommer (born 1968), Canadian ice hockey player
- William Plommer (died 1925), WWI veteran and murder victim

== See also ==
- Plimmer, another surname
- Plummer (surname), another surname
