= List of fellows of the Royal Society elected in 1910 =

This is a list of fellows of the Royal Society elected in 1910.

== Fellows ==
- August Friedrich Leopold Weismann (1834–1914)
- Paul Ehrlich (1854–1915)
- Henry George Plimmer (1856–1918)
- Bertram Hopkinson (1874–1918)
- John Allen Harker (1870–1923)
- Sir William Boog Leishman (1865–1926)
- Gilbert Charles Bourne (1861–1933)
- Frederick Augustus Dixey (1855–1935)
- Sir Archibald Edward Garrod (1857–1936)
- Louis Napoleon George Filon (1875–1937)
- Arthur Philemon Coleman (1852–1939)
- Alfred Fowler (1868–1940)
- Arthur Lapworth (1872–1941)
- Sir Joseph Barcroft (187–1947)
- Godfrey Harold Hardy (1877–1947)
- John Theodore Hewitt (1868–;1954)
- Frederick Soddy (1877–1956)

== Foreign members ==
1. Svante August Arrhenius (1859–1927) ForMemRS
2. Jean-Baptiste Édouard Bornet (1828–1911) ForMemRS
3. Vito Volterra (1860–1940) ForMemRS
4. August Friedrich Leopold Weismann (1834–1914) ForMemRS
