= Agnes Wold =

Swedish academic

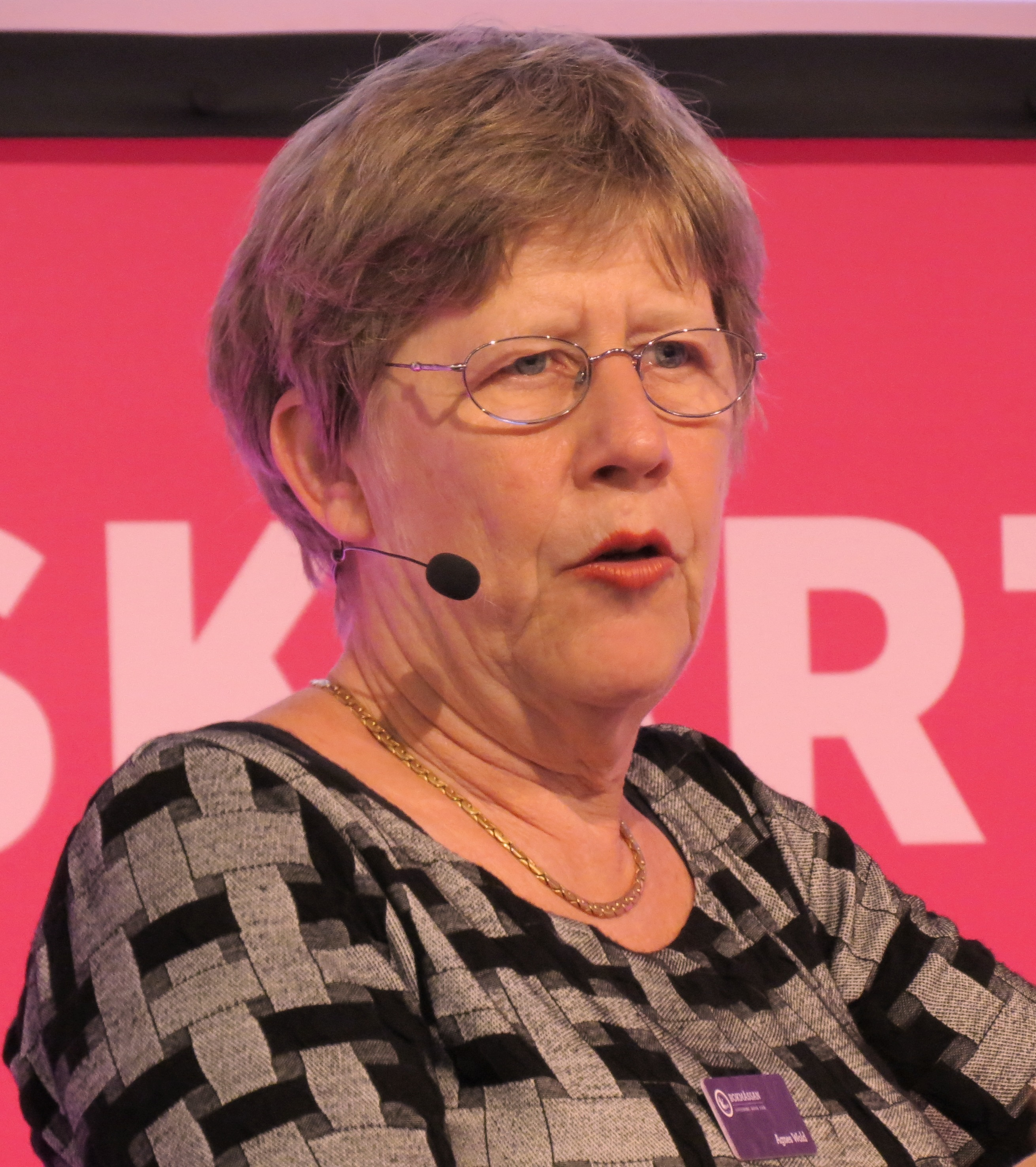
- Born: 7 January 1955 (age 71); Sweden
- Scientific career
- Fields: Microbiology
- Workplaces: University of Gothenburg

Agnes Wold (born 7 January 1955) is a professor of clinical bacteriology specializing in the normal flora of the body, at the Sahlgrenska Academy at the University of Gothenburg, Gothenburg, Sweden. She is a nationally known commentator on television, radio and in newspapers on issues related to infectious disease and women in science.

== Education and research ==
Wold completed her medical degree in 1989 at the University of Gothenburg. Wold specializes in the normal bacterial flora of the intestines, and their interaction with the immune system. Together with her group of scientists she focuses studies on how allergies and inflammatory bowel disease may be dependent on an altered gut-flora. She has studied allergy development in children of farmers for many years and suggested their low rates of allergy may be explained by the hygiene hypothesis of allergy development.

In January 2014, media called attention to Wold's development of a promising general vaccine against allergies, consisting of a bacterial protein working as an antigen stimulating the immune system.

== Advocacy for women in academia ==
In 1997, Wold, together with Christine Wennerås, published "Nepotism and Sexism in Peer-Review" in Nature which examined discrimination in peer-reviews of postdoctoral research awards at the Swedish Medical Research Council. The report scientifically showed that women needed significantly better academic credentials than men to succeed in applications for services and research grants. Wold was previously chairperson of the Kvinnliga akademikers förening (Association of Women Academics).

== Media appearances ==
Wold is a regular contributor to Swedish newspapers, Twitter, television and radio shows especially regarding infectious disease, allergy and women in science. During the COVID-19 pandemic, she became a regular source of practical advice for the general public.

== Awards ==
- Honorary doctor (2006) at Chalmers University of Technology, recognizing her work about discrimination against female researchers.
- Inducted into The Royal Society of Arts and Sciences in Gothenburg (Kungliga Vetenskaps- och Vitterhetssamhället i Göteborg) in 2014
- 'Professional Woman of the Year' (2015) by BPW Sweden (Business and Professional Women).
- 'Woman of the Year' (2016) by Expressen newspaper citing, in part, "In a media world that focuses on opinions and beautiful women, she made it to the top and made mincemeat of myths about cleaning, breastfeeding and menopause. In a short time, Professor Agnes Wold has gone from a combative role model in the old boy's club of the university world to becoming a woman going against the current for the whole of Sweden." (translated from Swedish).
- Learning Ladder Prize (2018) which recognizes Swedes who help others develop knowledge.

== Personal life ==
Wold is a daughter of statistician Herman Wold and mathematician Anna-Lisa Arrhenius-Wold, and a granddaughter of Svante Arrhenius, a winner of the Nobel Prize in Chemistry. She has three children.
