= Erik Edlund =

Swedish physicist (1819–1888)

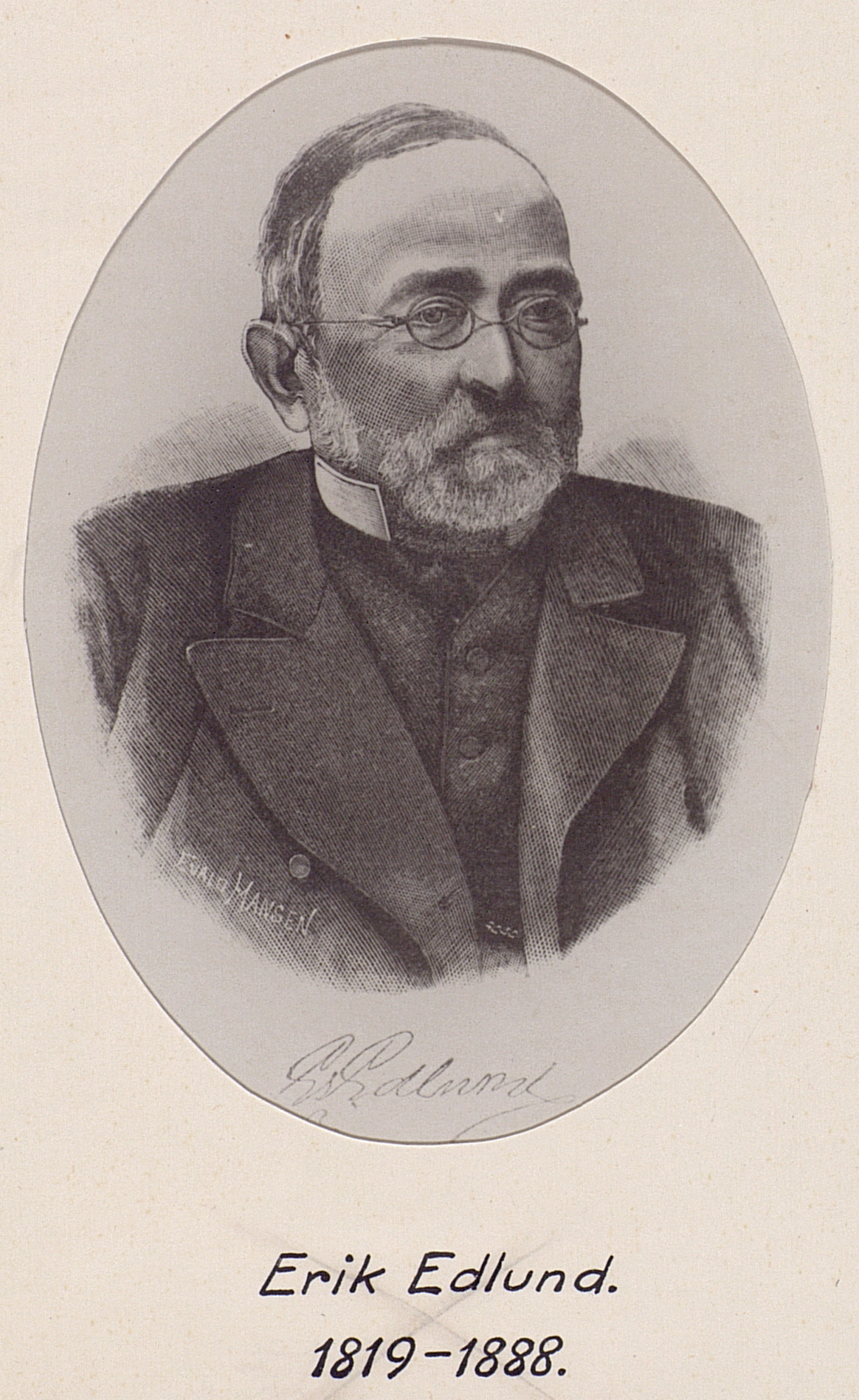
- Born: 14 March 1819; Närke Province
- Died: 19 August 1888 (aged 69); Stockholm

Erik Edlund (14 March 1819 – 19 August 1888) was a Swedish physicist. His scientific research was confined chiefly to the theory of electricity. He helped secure the introduction of weather stations to Sweden.

== Early life and education ==
Edlund was born in Närke, Sweden. He obtained his PhD in physics in 1845 at Uppsala University under Svanberg. Edlund then worked under Weber in Leipzig for two years after obtaining his PhD.

== Career ==
Edlund was employed as a professor of physics by the Royal Swedish Academy of Sciences in 1850, and became a member of the academy in 1851. In 1858, he became a member of the Royal Society of Sciences in Uppsala, and also of the Royal Swedish Academy of Agriculture; the latter academy made him an honorary member in 1878.

In 1858, Edlund was instrumental in securing the introduction of meteorological stations in Sweden. He conducted these observatories until 1873, when a central meteorological station was erected. The meteorological observations made by Edlund from 1858 to 1873 were published in 14 volumes by the Academy of Sciences.

Edlund is notable as the doctoral advisor of Svante Arrhenius.

In 1872, he was elected to the lower house of the Parliament of Sweden.

== Death ==
Edlund died in Stockholm.

== Research ==
Edlund investigated fluid motion, polarization of light during a total eclipse, and thermal phenomena accompanying changes in volume of solids. He studied electricity, describing a method of simultaneously transmitting messages in opposite directions along the same telegraph wire. He investigated the heat given off by induction currents. He studied electromotive forces generated when two different metals are put in contact. He investigated the resistance of arc lamps. He developed a theory of atmospheric electricity to explain the phenomenon of the northern lights. His publications include Theorie des phénomènes électriques (1874).
