= Svante Arrhenius =

Swedish scientist (1859–1927)

Svante Arrhenius ForMemRS
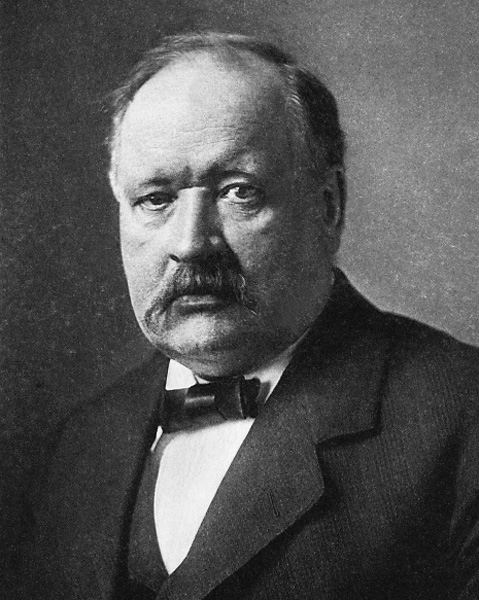
- Arrhenius in 1909
- Born: Svante August Arrhenius; 19 February 1859; Vik Castle, Uppsala County, Sweden
- Died: 2 October 1927 (aged 68); Stockholm, Sweden
- Education: Uppsala University
- Known for: Calculation of the greenhouse effect; Arrhenius equation; Acid-base reaction
- Awards: Davy Medal (1902); Nobel Prize in Chemistry (1903); Willard Gibbs Award (1911); Faraday Lectureship Prize (1914); Franklin Medal (1920)
- Scientific career
- Fields: Physics; Chemistry
- Workplaces: Stockholm University
- Doctoral advisors: Per Teodor Cleve; Erik Edlund
- Doctoral students: Oskar Benjamin Klein

Svante August Arrhenius (Note: /əˈriːniəs, əˈreɪniəs/ ə-REE-nee-əs, -RAY-, Swedish: [ˈsvânːtɛ aˈrěːnɪɵs]) (19 February 1859 – 2 October 1927) was a Swedish scientist. Originally a physicist, but often referred to as a chemist, Arrhenius was one of the founders of the science of physical chemistry. In 1903, he received the Nobel Prize in Chemistry, becoming the first Swedish Nobel laureate. In 1905, he became the director of the Nobel Institute, where he remained until his death.

Arrhenius was the first to use the principles of physical chemistry to estimate the extent to which increases in the atmospheric carbon dioxide are responsible for the Earth's increasing surface temperature. His work played an important role in the emergence of modern climate science. In the 1960s, Charles David Keeling reliably measured the level of carbon dioxide present in the air showing it was increasing and that, according to the greenhouse hypothesis, it was sufficient to cause significant global warming.

The Arrhenius equation, Arrhenius acid, Arrhenius base, lunar crater Arrhenius, Martian crater Arrhenius, the mountain of Arrheniusfjellet, and the Arrhenius Labs at Stockholm University were so named to commemorate his contributions to science.

== Biography ==
=== Early years ===
Arrhenius was born on 19 February 1859 at Vik (which can also be spelled as Wik or Wijk), near Uppsala, Kingdom of Sweden, the son of Svante Gustav and Carolina Thunberg Arrhenius, who were Lutheran. His father had been a land surveyor for Uppsala University, moving up to a supervisory position. At the age of three, Arrhenius taught himself to read without the encouragement of his parents and, by watching his father's addition of numbers in his account books, became an arithmetical prodigy. In later life, Arrhenius was profoundly passionate about mathematical concepts, data analysis and discovering their relationships and laws.

At age eight, he entered the local cathedral school, starting in the fifth grade, distinguishing himself in physics and mathematics, and graduating as the youngest and most able student in 1876.

=== Ionic disassociation ===
At the University of Uppsala, he was dissatisfied with the chief instructor of physics and the only faculty member who could have supervised him in chemistry, Per Teodor Cleve, so he left to study at the Physical Institute of the Swedish Academy of Sciences in Stockholm under the physicist Erik Edlund in 1881.

His work focused on the conductivities of electrolytes. In 1884, based on this work, he submitted a 150-page dissertation on electrolytic conductivity to Uppsala for the doctorate. It did not impress the professors, who included Cleve, and he received a fourth-class degree, but upon his defense it was reclassified as third-class. Later, extensions of this very work would earn him the 1903 Nobel Prize in Chemistry.

Arrhenius put forth 56 theses in his 1884 dissertation, most of which would still be accepted today unchanged or with minor modifications. The most important idea in the dissertation was his explanation of the fact that solid crystalline salts disassociate into paired charged particles when dissolved, for which he would win the 1903 Nobel Prize in Chemistry. Arrhenius's explanation was that in forming a solution, the salt disassociates into charged particles that Michael Faraday had given the name ions many years earlier. Faraday's belief had been that ions were produced in the process of electrolysis, that is, an external direct current source of electricity was necessary to form ions. Arrhenius proposed that, even in the absence of an electric current, aqueous solutions of salts contained ions. He thus proposed that chemical reactions in solution were reactions between ions.

The dissertation did not impress the professors at Uppsala, but Arrhenius sent it to a number of scientists in Europe who were developing the new science of physical chemistry, such as Rudolf Clausius, Wilhelm Ostwald, and Jacobus Henricus van 't Hoff. They were far more impressed, and Ostwald even came to Uppsala to persuade Arrhenius to join his research team in Riga. Arrhenius declined, however, as he preferred to stay in Sweden-Norway for a while (his father was very ill and would die in 1885) and had received an appointment at Uppsala.

In an extension of his ionic theory Arrhenius proposed definitions for acids and bases, in 1884. He believed that acids were substances that produce hydrogen ions in solution and that bases were substances that produce hydroxide ions in solution.

=== Middle period ===
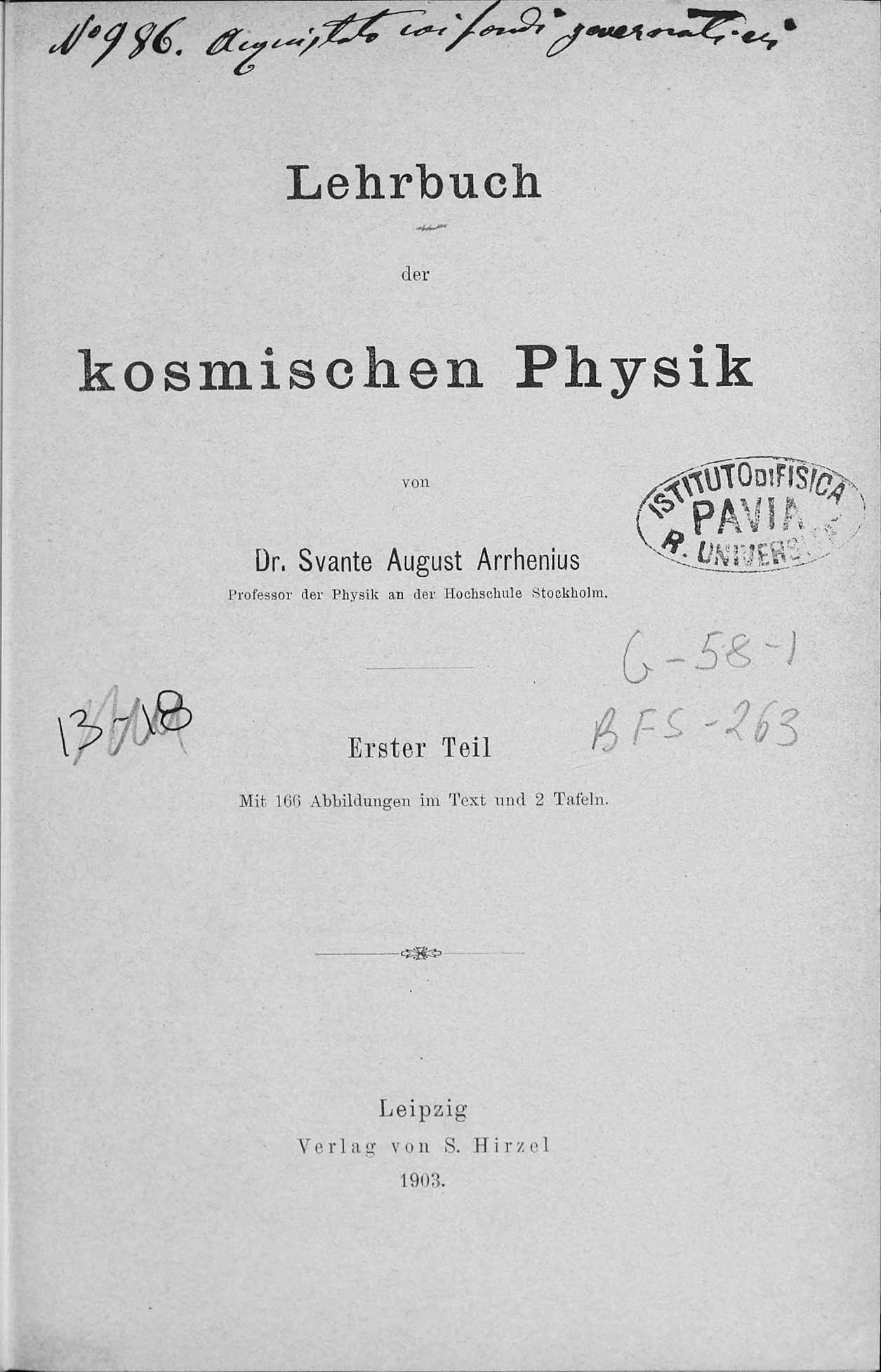
Lehrbuch der kosmischen Physik, 1903

In 1885, Arrhenius next received a travel grant from the Swedish Academy of Sciences, which enabled him to study with Ostwald in Riga and Leipzig, with Friedrich Kohlrausch in Würzburg, Germany, with Ludwig Boltzmann in Graz, Austria, and with Jacobus Henricus van 't Hoff in Amsterdam.

In 1889, while carrying out research with Ostwald at Leipzig University, Arrhenius developed what is now known as the Arrhenius equation. He explained the fact that most reactions require added heat energy to proceed by formulating the concept of activation energy, an energy barrier that must be overcome before two molecules will react. The Arrhenius equation gives the quantitative basis of the relationship between the activation energy and the rate at which a reaction proceeds.

In 1891, he became a lecturer at the Stockholm University College (Stockholms Högskola, now Stockholm University), being promoted to professor of physics (with much opposition) in 1895, and rector in 1896.

=== Nobel Prizes ===
About 1900, Arrhenius became involved in setting up the Nobel Institutes and the Nobel Prizes. He was elected a member of the Royal Swedish Academy of Sciences in 1901. For the rest of his life, he would be a member of the Nobel Committee on Physics and a de facto member of the Nobel Committee on Chemistry. He used his positions to arrange prizes for his friends (Jacobus van 't Hoff, Wilhelm Ostwald, Theodore Richards) and to attempt to deny them to his enemies (Paul Ehrlich, Walther Nernst, Dmitri Mendeleev). In 1901 Arrhenius was elected to the Swedish Academy of Sciences, against strong opposition. In 1903 he became the first Swede to be awarded the Nobel Prize in Chemistry. In 1905, upon the founding of the Nobel Institute for Physical Research at Stockholm, he was appointed rector of the institute, the position where he remained until retirement in 1927.

In 1911, he won the first Willard Gibbs Award.

=== Society memberships ===
He was elected an International Member of the United States National Academy of Sciences in 1908.

He was elected an Honorary Member of the Netherlands Chemical Society in 1909.

He became a Foreign Member of the Royal Society (ForMemRS) in 1910.

He was elected an International Member of the American Philosophical Society in 1911.

In 1912, he was elected a Foreign Honorary Member of the American Academy of Arts and Sciences

In 1919, he became foreign member of the Royal Netherlands Academy of Arts and Sciences.

=== Later years ===
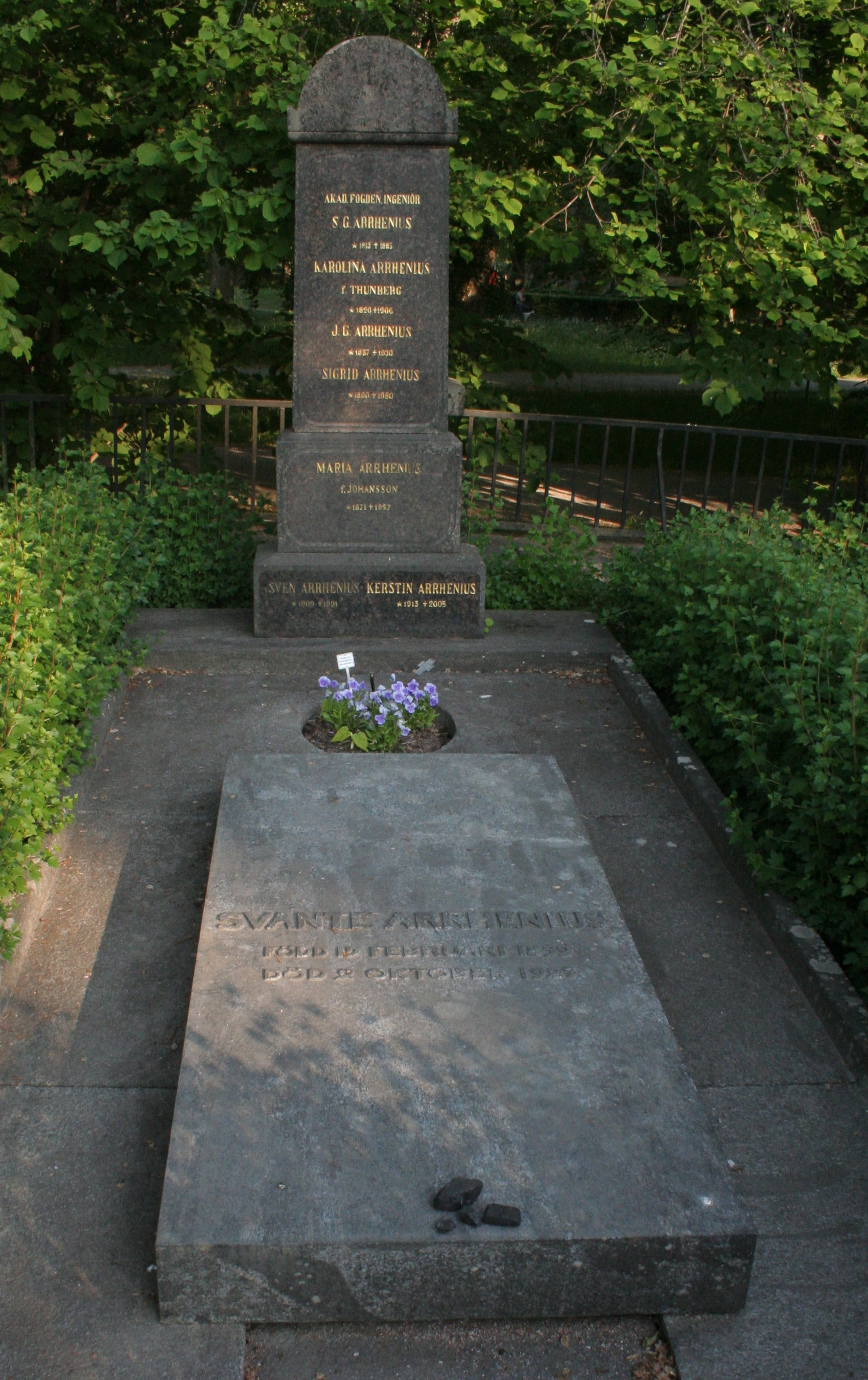
Arrhenius family grave in Uppsala

Eventually, Arrhenius's theories became generally accepted and he turned to other scientific topics. In 1902, he began to investigate physiological problems in terms of chemical theory. He determined that reactions in living organisms and in the test tube followed the same laws.

In 1904, he delivered at the University of California, Berkeley a course of lectures, the object of which was to illustrate the application of the methods of physical chemistry to the study of the theory of toxins and antitoxins, and which were published in 1907 under the title Immunochemistry. He also turned his attention to geology (the origin of ice ages), astronomy, physical cosmology, and astrophysics, accounting for the birth of the Solar System by interstellar collision. He considered radiation pressure as accounting for comets, the solar corona, the aurora borealis, and zodiacal light.

He thought life might have been carried from planet to planet by the transport of spores, the theory now known as panspermia. He thought of the idea of a universal language, proposing a modification of the English language.

He was a board member for the Swedish Society for Racial Hygiene (founded 1909), which endorsed mendelism at the time, and contributed to the topic of contraceptives around 1910. However, until 1938 information and sale of contraceptives was prohibited in the Kingdom of Sweden. Gordon Stein wrote that Svante Arrhenius was an atheist. Other sources present him as a Lutheran.In his last years he wrote both textbooks and popular books, trying to emphasize the need for further work on the topics he discussed. In September 1927, he came down with an attack of acute intestinal catarrh and died on 2 October. He was buried in Uppsala.

== Marriages and family ==
He was married twice, first to his former pupil Sofia Rudbeck (1894–1896), with whom he had one son, Olof Arrhenius, and then to Maria Johansson (1905–1927), with whom he had two daughters and a son.

Arrhenius was the grandfather of bacteriologist Agnes Wold, chemist Svante Wold, and ocean biogeochemist Gustaf Arrhenius.

Svante Thunberg, father of climate activist Greta Thunberg and an ancestral cousin of Arrhenius, is named after him.

== Greenhouse effect ==
In developing a theory to explain the ice ages, Arrhenius, in 1896, was the first to use basic principles of physical chemistry to calculate estimates of the extent to which increases in atmospheric carbon dioxide (CO_{2}) will increase Earth's surface temperature through the greenhouse effect. These calculations led him to conclude that human-caused CO_{2} emissions, from fossil-fuel burning and other combustion processes, are large enough to cause global warming. This conclusion has been extensively tested, winning a place at the core of modern climate science. Arrhenius, in this work, built upon the prior work of other famous scientists, including Joseph Fourier, John Tyndall, and Claude Pouillet. Arrhenius wanted to determine whether greenhouse gases could contribute to the explanation of the temperature variation between glacial and inter-glacial periods. Arrhenius used infrared observations of the moon – by Frank Washington Very and Samuel Pierpont Langley at the Allegheny Observatory in Pittsburgh – to calculate how much of infrared (heat) radiation is captured by CO_{2} and water (H_{2}O) vapour in Earth's atmosphere. Using 'Stefan's law' (better known as the Stefan–Boltzmann law), he formulated what he referred to as a 'rule'. In its original form, Arrhenius's rule reads as follows:

if the quantity of carbonic acid increases in geometric progression, the augmentation of the temperature will increase nearly in arithmetic progression.

Here, Arrhenius refers to CO_{2} as carbonic acid (which refers only to the aqueous form H_{2}CO_{3} in modern usage). The following formulation of Arrhenius's rule is still in use today:

$$\Delta F = \alpha \ln(C/C_0)$$

where $C_0$ is the concentration of CO_{2} at the beginning (time-zero) of the period being studied (if the same concentration unit is used for both $C$ and $C_0$, then it doesn't matter which concentration unit is used); $C$ is the CO_{2} concentration at end of the period being studied; ln is the natural logarithm (= log base e (log_{e})); and $\Delta F$ is the augmentation of the temperature, in other words the change in the rate of heating Earth's surface (radiative forcing), which is measured in Watts per square meter. Derivations from atmospheric radiative transfer models have found that $\alpha$ (alpha) for CO_{2} is 5.35 (± 10%) W/m^{2} for Earth's atmosphere.

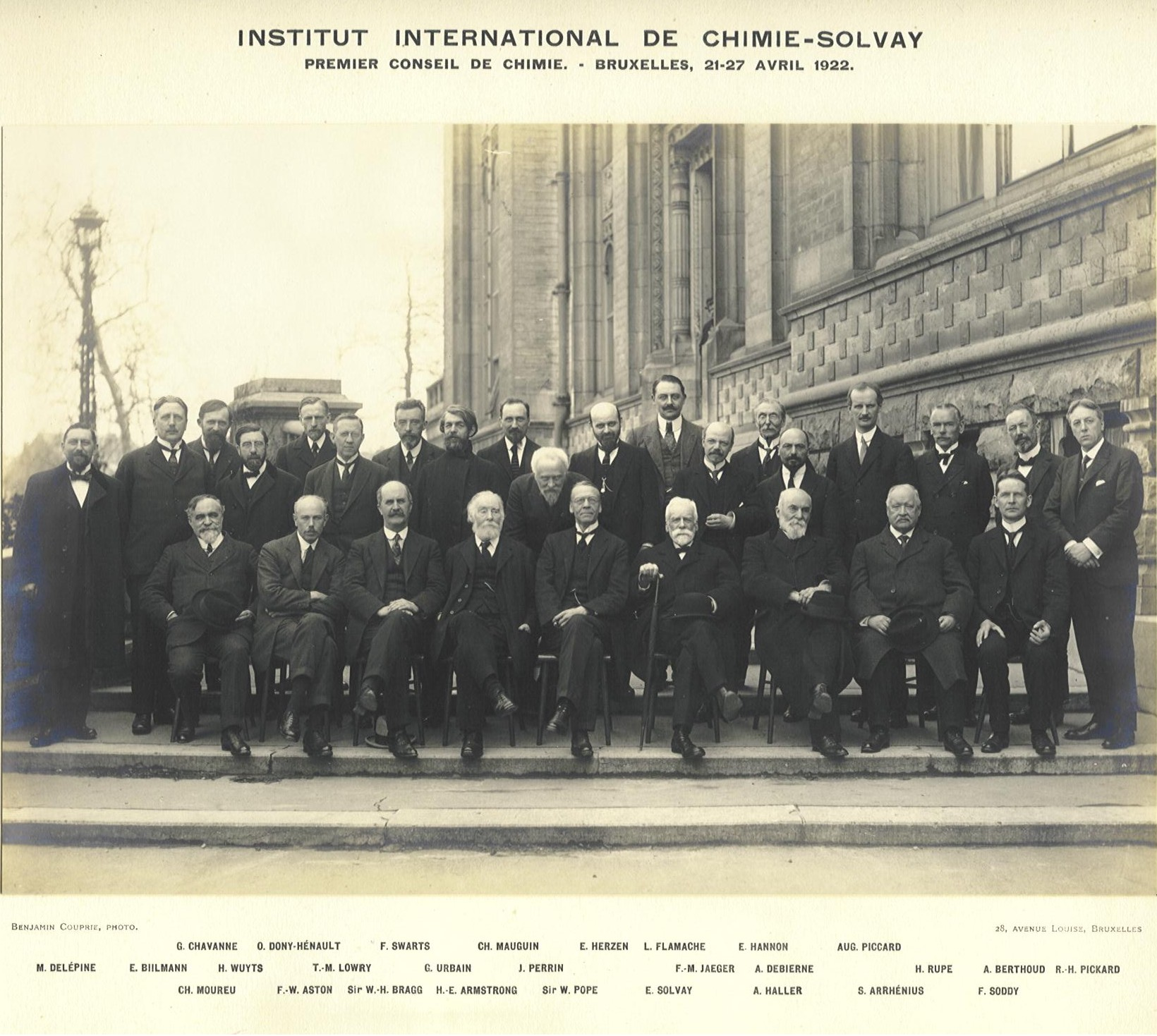
Arrhenius at the first Solvay conference on chemistry in 1922 in Brussels

Based on information from his colleague Arvid Högbom, Arrhenius was the first person to predict that emissions of carbon dioxide from the burning of fossil fuels and other combustion processes were large enough to cause global warming. In his calculation Arrhenius included the feedback from changes in water vapor as well as latitudinal effects, but he omitted clouds, convection of heat upward in the atmosphere, and other essential factors. His work is currently seen less as an accurate quantification of global warming than as the first demonstration that increases in atmospheric CO_{2} will cause global warming, everything else being equal.

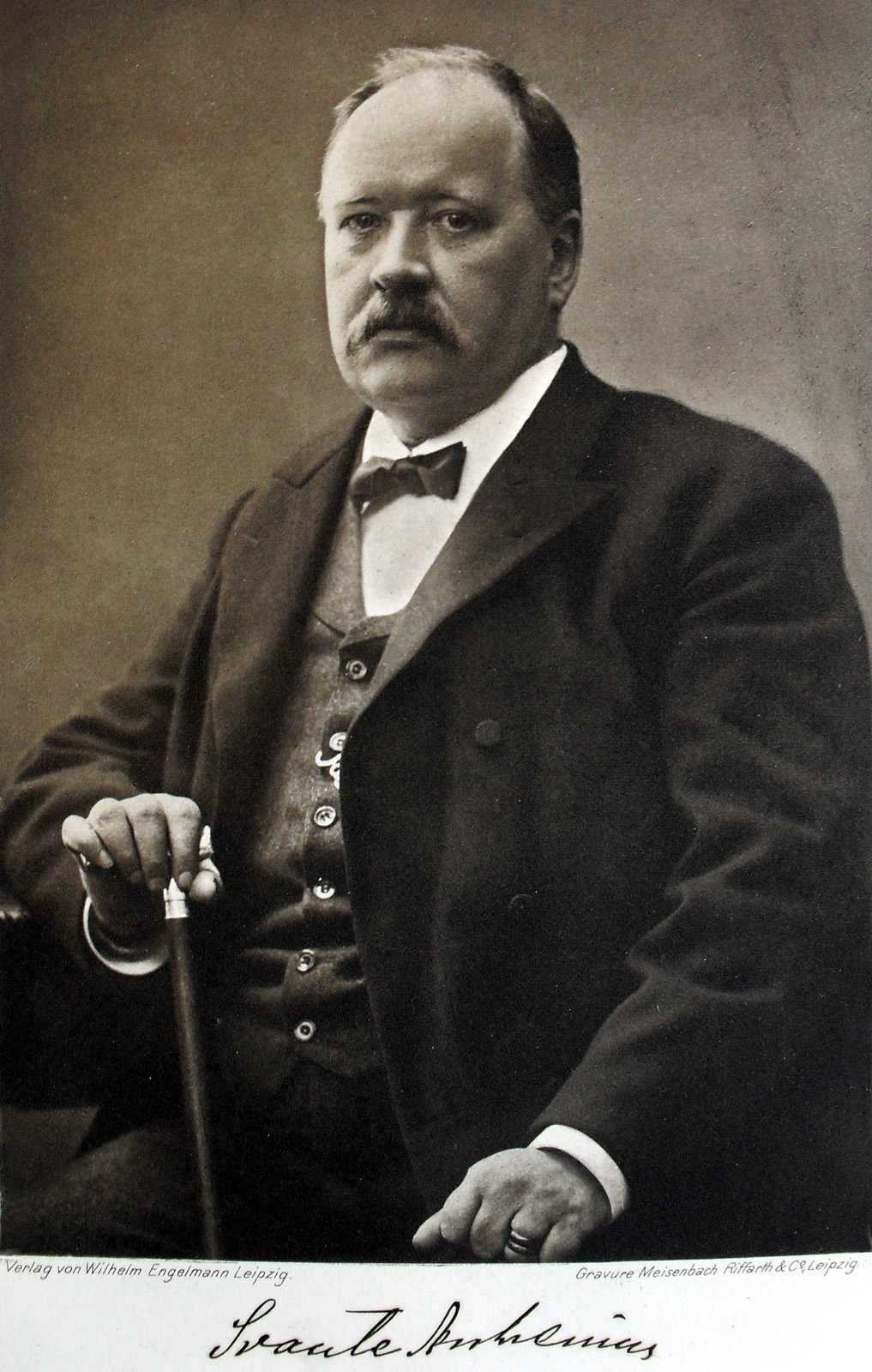
Arrhenius in 1909

Arrhenius's absorption values for CO_{2} and his conclusions met criticism by Knut Ångström in 1900, who published the first modern infrared absorption spectrum of CO_{2} with two absorption bands, and published experimental results that seemed to show that absorption of infrared radiation by the gas in the atmosphere was already "saturated" so that adding more could make no difference. Arrhenius replied strongly in 1901 (Annalen der Physik), dismissing the critique altogether. He touched on the subject briefly in a technical book titled Lehrbuch der kosmischen Physik (1903). He later wrote Världarnas utveckling (1906) (German: Das Werden der Welten [1907], English: Worlds in the Making [1908]) directed at a general audience, where he suggested that the human emission of CO_{2} would be strong enough to prevent the world from entering a new ice age, and that a warmer earth would be needed to feed the rapidly increasing population:

"To a certain extent the temperature of the earth's surface, as we shall presently see, is conditioned by the properties of the atmosphere surrounding it, and particularly by the permeability of the latter for the rays of heat." (p. 46)

"That the atmospheric envelopes limit the heat losses from the planets had been suggested about 1800 by the great French physicist Fourier. His ideas were further developed afterwards by Pouillet and Tyndall. Their theory has been styled the hot-house theory, because they thought that the atmosphere acted after the manner of the glass panes of hot-houses." (p. 51)

"If the quantity of carbonic acid [ CO_{2} + H_{2}O → H_{2}CO_{3} (carbonic acid) ] in the air should sink to one-half its present percentage, the temperature would fall by about 4°; a diminution to one-quarter would reduce the temperature by 8°. On the other hand, any doubling of the percentage of carbon dioxide in the air would raise the temperature of the earth's surface by 4°; and if the carbon dioxide were increased fourfold, the temperature would rise by 8°." (p. 53)

"Although the sea, by absorbing carbonic acid, acts as a regulator of huge capacity, which takes up about five-sixths of the produced carbonic acid, we yet recognize that the slight percentage of carbonic acid in the atmosphere may by the advances of industry be changed to a noticeable degree in the course of a few centuries." (p. 54)

"Since, now, warm ages have alternated with glacial periods, even after man appeared on the earth, we have to ask ourselves: Is it probable that we shall in the coming geological ages be visited by a new ice period that will drive us from our temperate countries into the hotter climates of Africa? There does not appear to be much ground for such an apprehension. The enormous combustion of coal by our industrial establishments suffices to increase the percentage of carbon dioxide in the air to a perceptible degree." (p. 61)

"We often hear lamentations that the coal stored up in the earth is wasted by the present generation without any thought of the future, and we are terrified by the awful destruction of life and property which has followed the volcanic eruptions of our days. We may find a kind of consolation in the consideration that here, as in every other case, there is good mixed with the evil. By the influence of the increasing percentage of carbonic acid in the atmosphere, we may hope to enjoy ages with more equable and better climates, especially as regards the colder regions of the earth, ages when the earth will bring forth much more abundant crops than at present, for the benefit of rapidly propagating mankind." (p. 63)

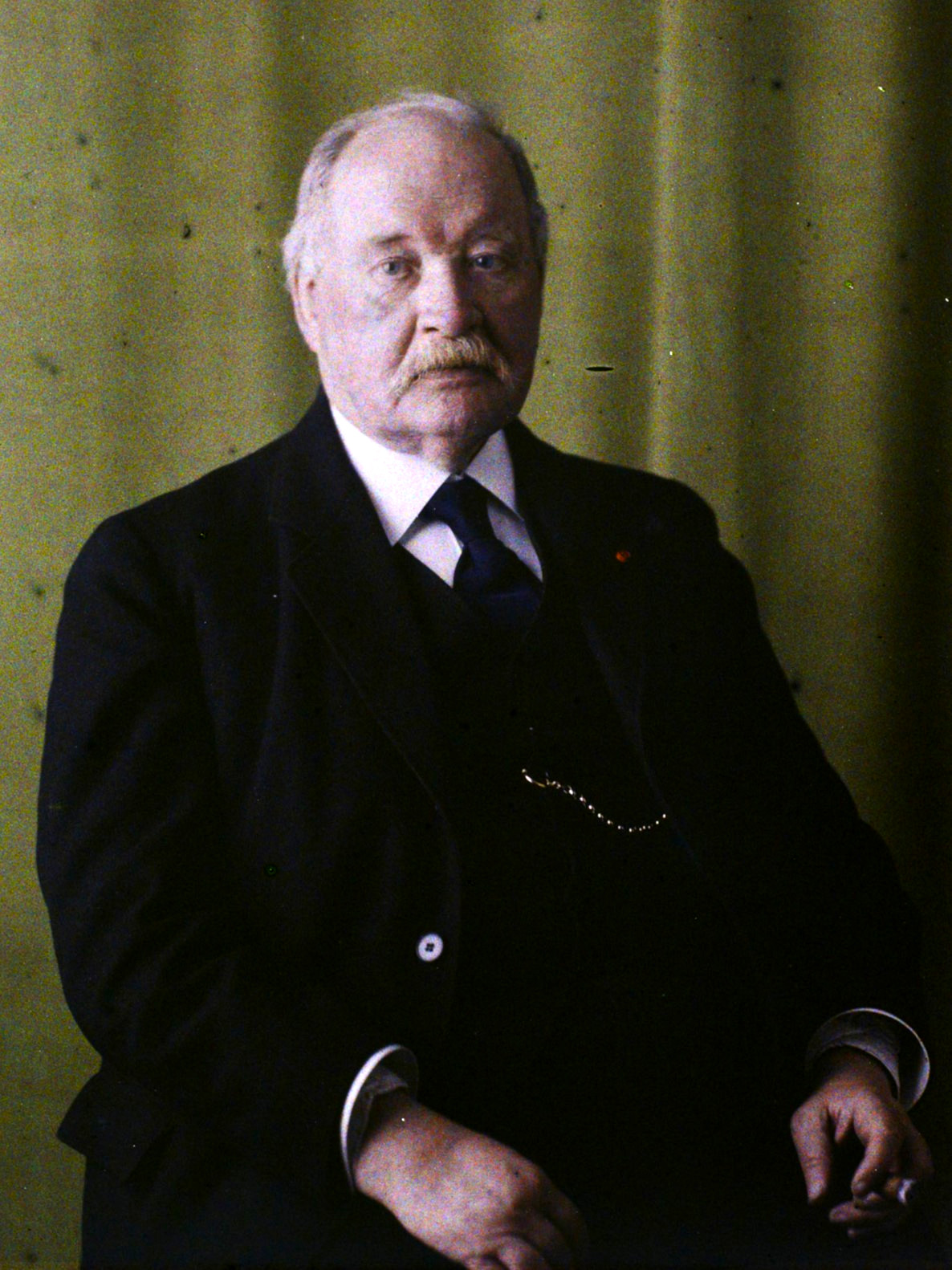
Autochrome portrait by Auguste Léon, 1922

At this time, the accepted consensus explanation is that, historically, orbital forcing has set the timing for ice ages, with CO_{2} acting as an essential amplifying feedback. However, CO_{2} releases since the industrial revolution have increased CO_{2} to a level not found since 10 to 15 million years ago, when the global average surface temperature was up to 6 °C (11 °F) warmer than now and almost all ice had melted, raising world sea-levels to about 100 feet (30 m.) higher than today's.

Arrhenius estimated based on the CO_{2} levels at his time, that reducing levels by 0.62–0.55 would decrease temperatures by 4–5 °C (Celsius) and an increase of 2.5 to 3 times of CO_{2} would cause a temperature rise of 8–9 °C in the Arctic. In his book Worlds in the Making he described the "hot-house" theory of the atmosphere.

In 1971, S. Ichtiaque Rasool and Stephen Henry Schneider determined that doubling the atmospheric concentration of CO_{2} would increase the Earth's temperature by about 0.8°C and an increase by a factor of ten would increase temperature by 2.5°C. Their conclusion at that time was that we could not prevent the coming ice age, no matter how much coal were to be burned. However, this was retracted in 1974 when Schneider realized that they had overestimated the impact of anthropogenic aerosols compared to natural. Modern estimates of the global temperature change in response to increasing carbon dioxide concentration using General circulation models are broadly in agreement with Arrhenius' original estimates

== Works ==
- 1884, Recherches sur la conductibilité galvanique des électrolytes, doctoral dissertation, Stockholm, Royal publishing house, P. A. Norstedt & Söner, 155 pages.
- 1896a, Ueber den Einfluss des Atmosphärischen Kohlensäurengehalts auf die Temperatur der Erdoberfläche, in the Proceedings of the Royal Swedish Academy of Science, Stockholm 1896, Volume 22, I N. 1, pages 1–101.
- 1896b, On the Influence of Carbonic Acid in the Air upon the Temperature of the Ground, London, Edinburgh, and Dublin Philosophical Magazine and Journal of Science (fifth series), April 1896. vol 41, pages 237–275.
- 1901a, Ueber die Wärmeabsorption durch Kohlensäure, Annalen der Physik, Vol 4, 1901, pages 690–705.
- 1901b, Über Die Wärmeabsorption Durch Kohlensäure Und Ihren Einfluss Auf Die Temperatur Der Erdoberfläche. Abstract of the proceedings of the Royal Academy of Science, 58, 25–58.
- Arrhenius, Svante. Die Verbreitung des Lebens im Weltenraum. Die Umschau, Frankfurt a. M., 7, 1903, 481–486.
- Lehrbuch der kosmischen Physik (in German). Vol. 1. Leipzig: Hirzel. 1903.
  - Lehrbuch der kosmischen Physik (in German). Vol. 2. Leipzig: Hirzel. 1903.
- 1906, Die vermutliche Ursache der Klimaschwankungen, Meddelanden från K. Vetenskapsakademiens Nobelinstitut, Vol 1 No 2, pages 1–10
- 1908, Das Werden der Welten (Worlds in the making; the evolution of the universe), Academic Publishing House, Leipzig, 208 pages.

== See also ==
- Arrhenius law
- Arrhenius plot
- History of climate change science
- Néel relaxation theory, also called Néel–Arrhenius theory
- Viscosity models for mixtures
- James Croll
- Eunice Newton Foote
- George Perkins Marsh
- Milutin Milanković
