= Vik Castle =

- Viks slott, Wik, Wijk (in Swedish)
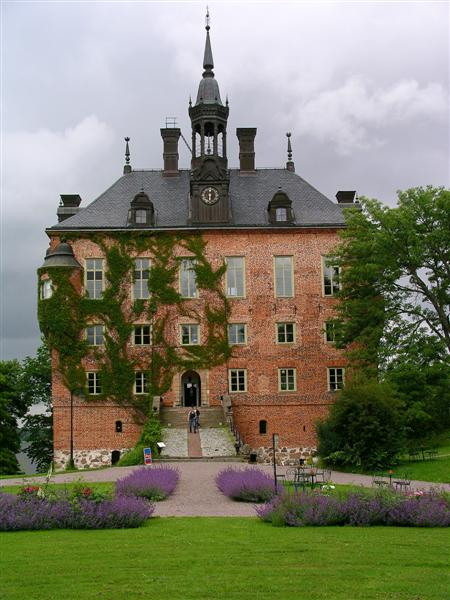
- Interactive map of the Vik Castle area

General information
- Type: Castle
- Location: Balingsta, Balingsta District, Uppsala County, Uppland, Sweden
- Coordinates: 59°44′10″N 17°27′42″E
- Construction started: 15th century

Vik Castle (Viks slott) is situated in Uppsala municipality and Balingsta district in Uppsala County, in the historical province of Uppland, Sweden. The name of the castle is sometimes spelled Wik or Wijk, which is a spelling according to older Swedish spelling rules.

== History ==
The castle was constructed in the 15th century, in the manner of a large tower house, near the community of Balingsta. Historically, it was part of the Hagunda hundred (härad), which spanned part of the territory of today's Enköping Municipality and Uppsala Municipality (kommun), both of which lie in the modern day Uppsala County (län). The castle's principal building materials were stone and brick.

The castle grounds include several other historically valuable structures. The castle underwent several renovation efforts during the 19th century, some of which were based on plans prepared by Swedish architect Fredrik Wilhelm Scholander (1816-1881). Vik Castle was declared a Swedish national monument on 3 December 1982.

Vik Castle was the birthplace of Svante Arrhenius, winner of the 1903 Nobel Prize for Chemistry.

In 1973 and 1974, the castle's interiors were used for recording Antik Musik På Wik ('Early Music at Wik'), an album of medieval and Renaissance music performed by the Swedish period music ensemble Joculatores Upsalienses. The album was published by Swedish record label BIS in 1974.

Currently, the castle serves primarily as a conference centre, and also offers accommodation, with up to 86 beds for visitors. Vik is generally considered to be the best-preserved medieval castle in Sweden.

== Gallery ==
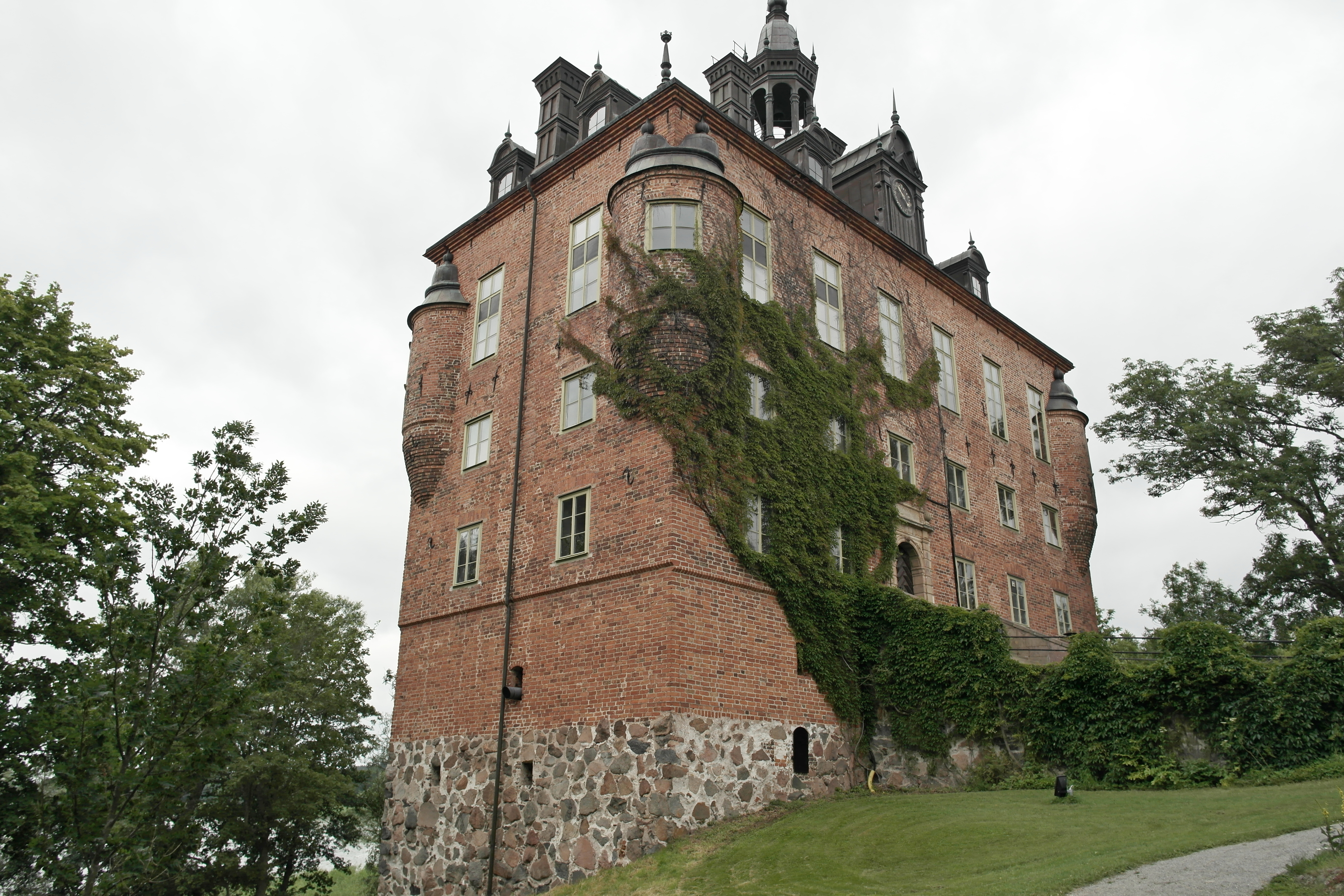
A view of the castle's front facade from the eastern side (July 2012)

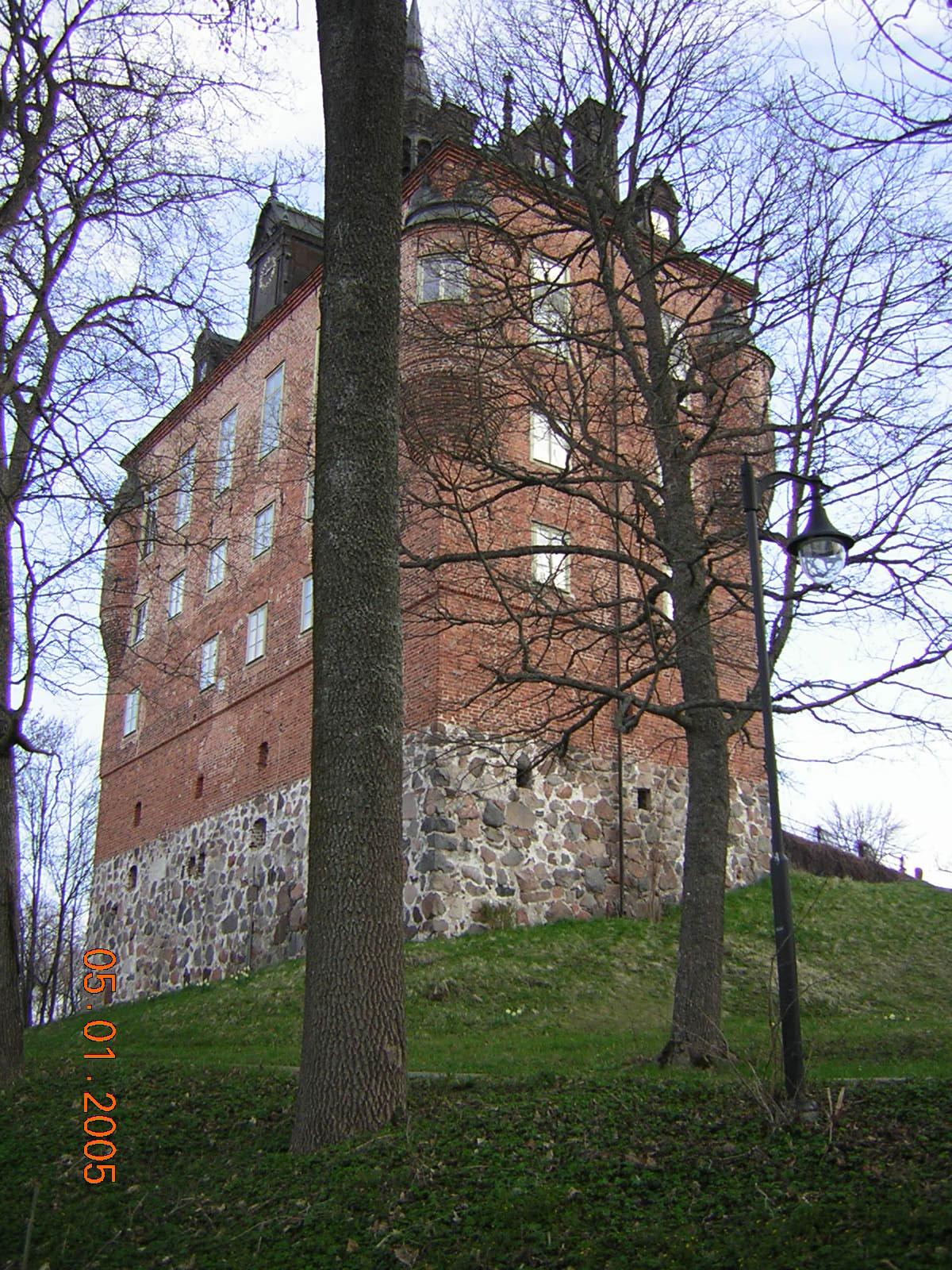
Backside of Vik Castle, near the lake shore (2005)

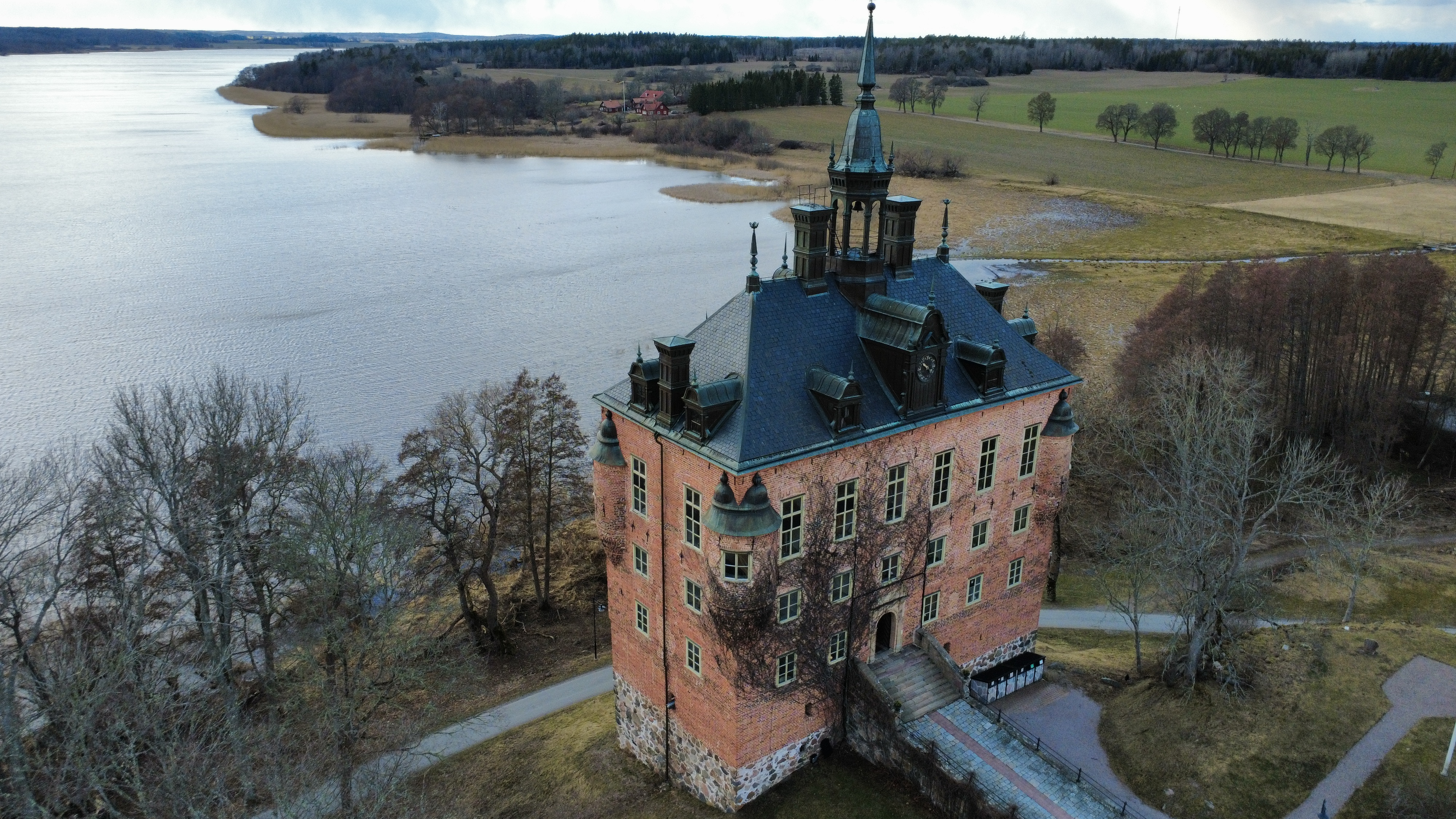
Aerial Photo of Vik Castle (March 2025)

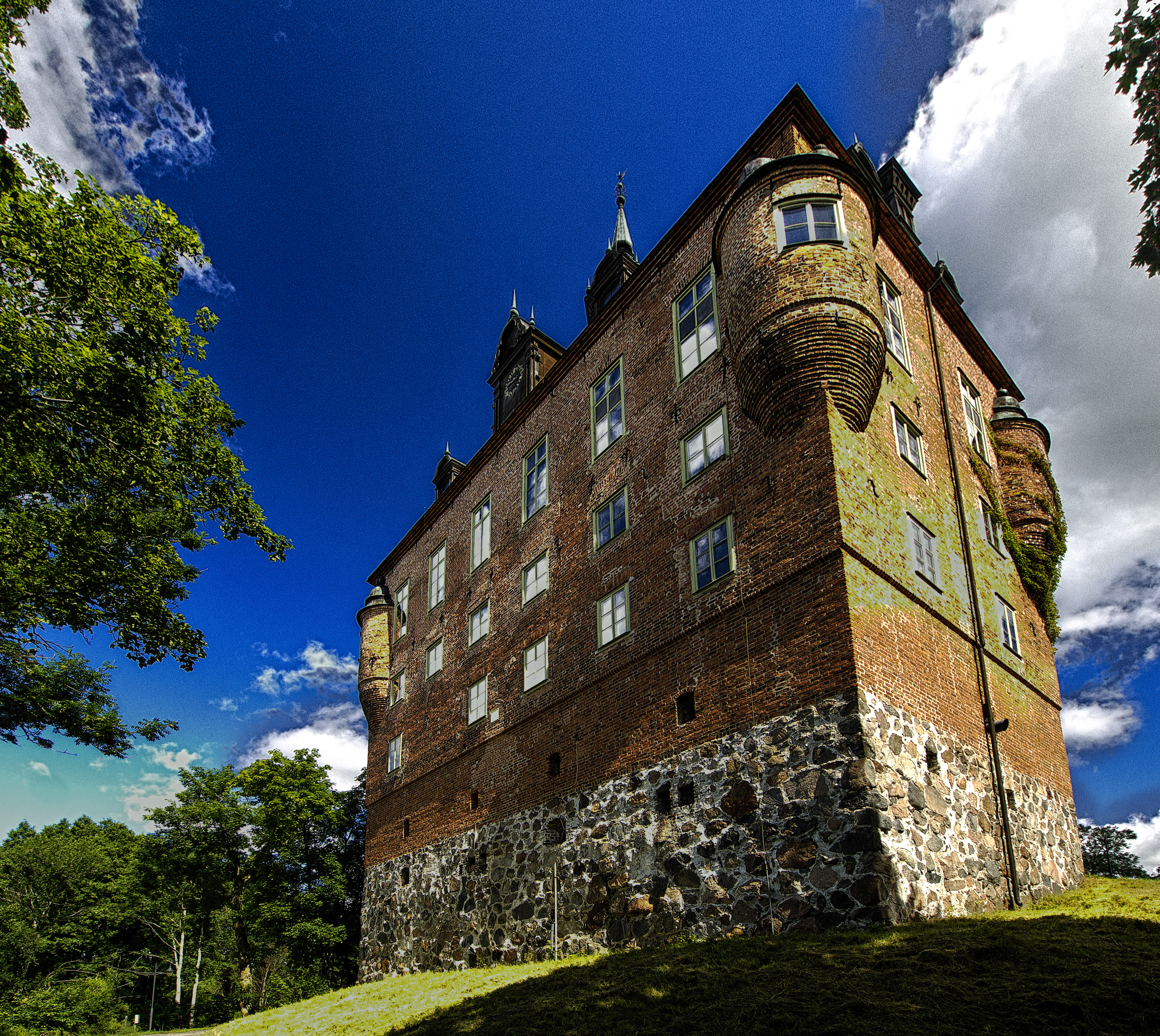
Backside of Vik Castle, close-up (July 2012)

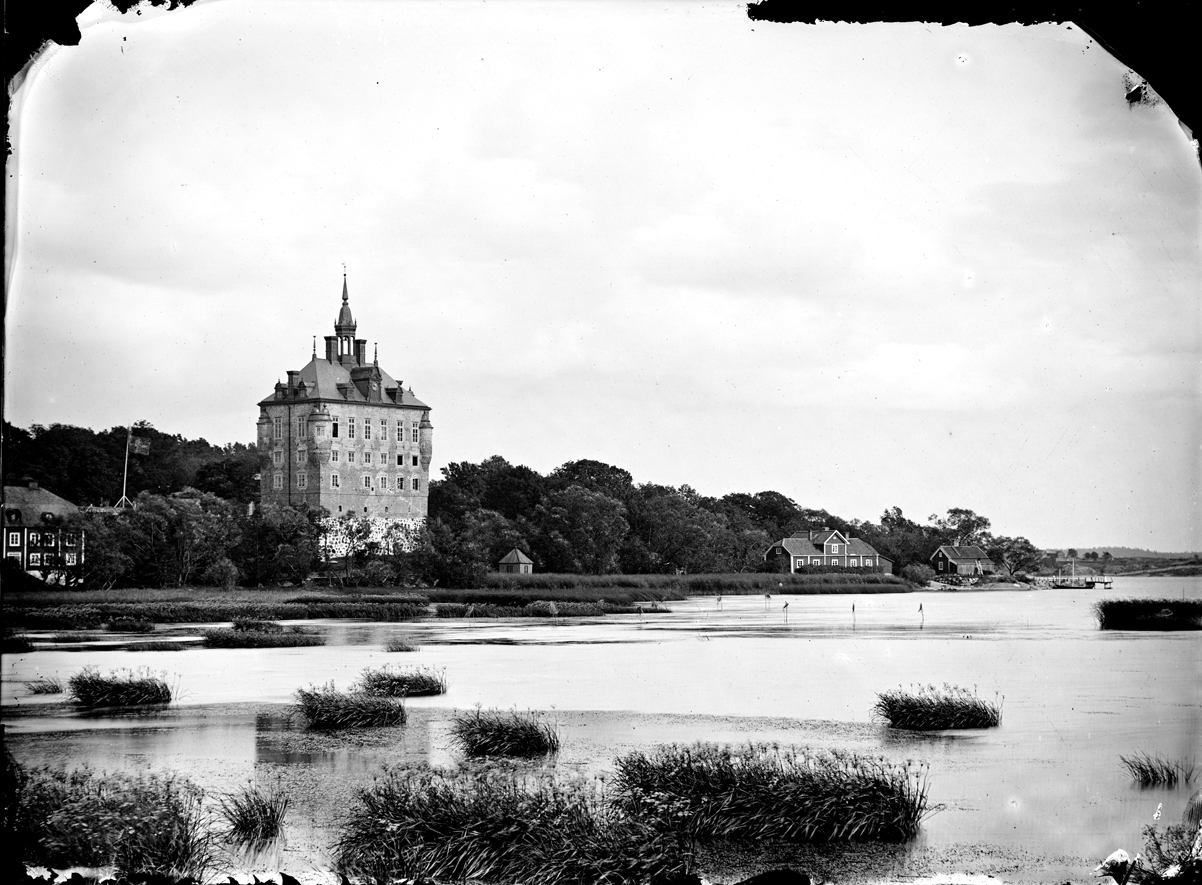
Period view of Vik Castle from the southwest, across the lake (December 1864)

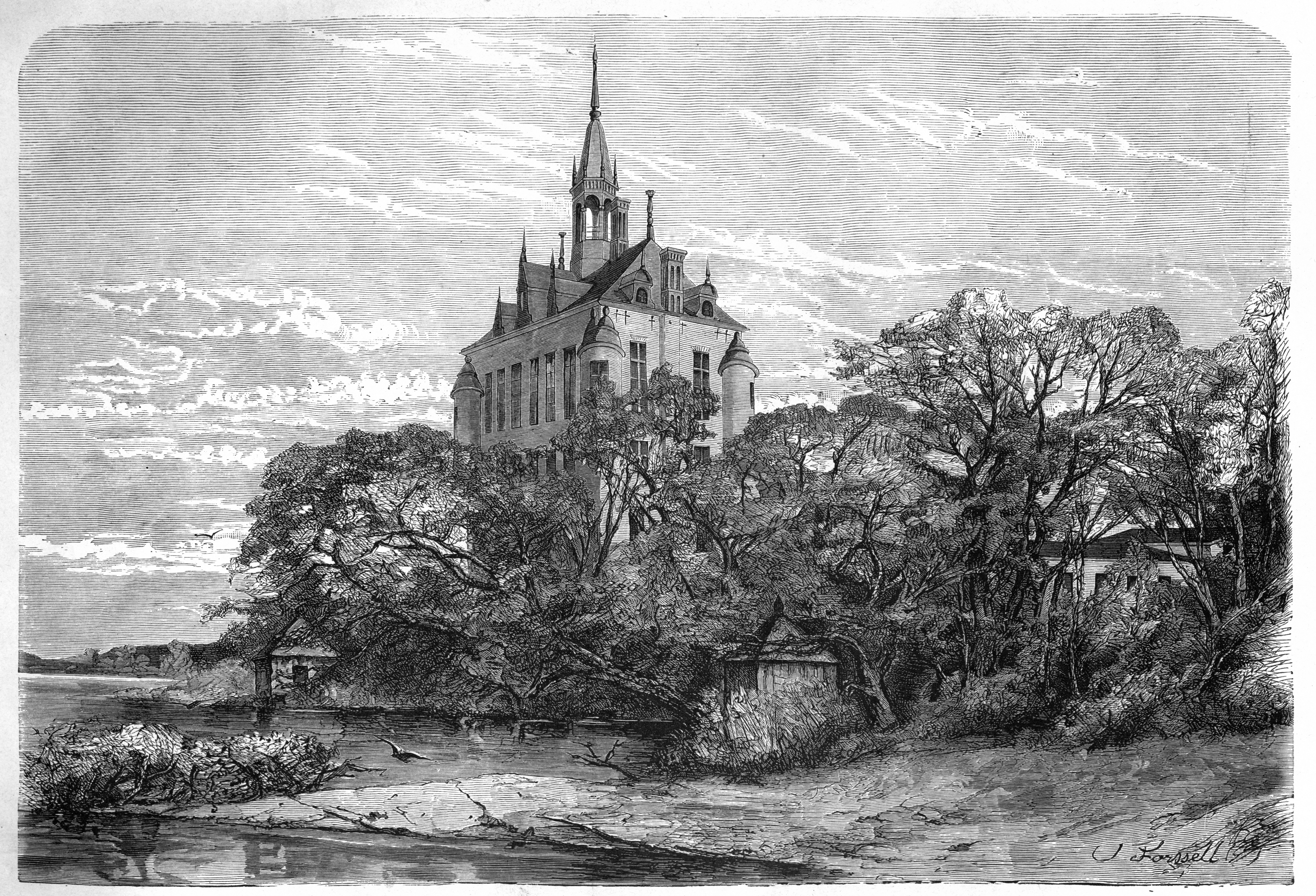
Period backside view of Vik Castle (1877)

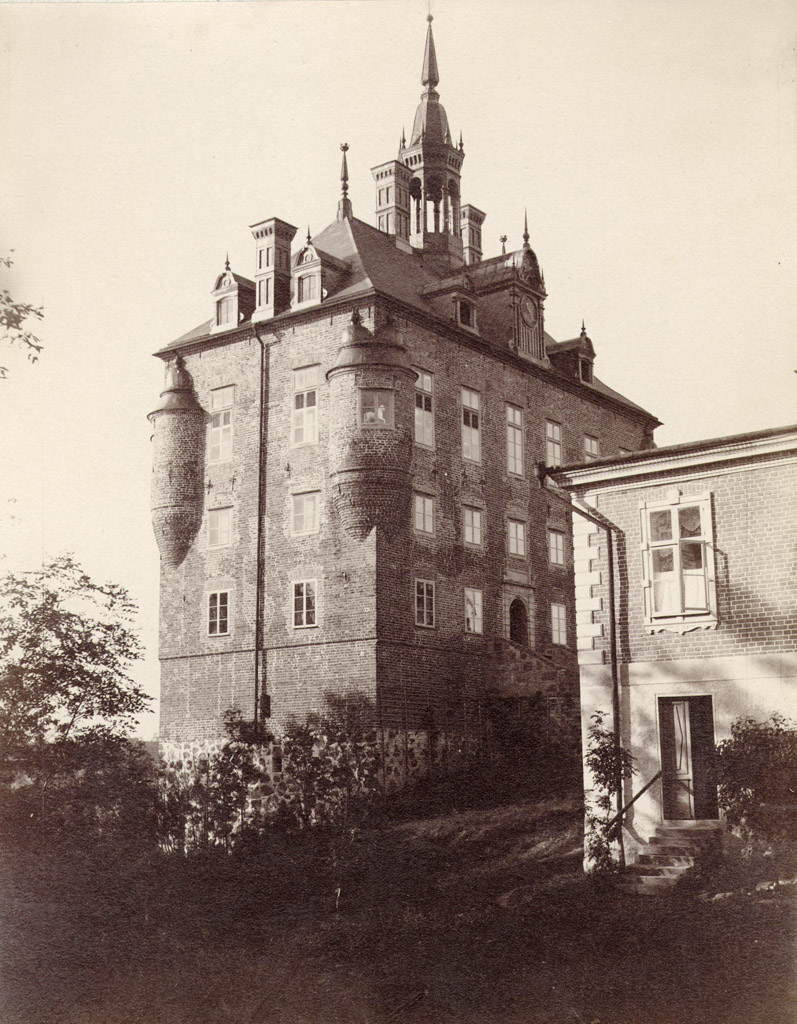
Period view of the castle's front facade from the eastern side (1881)

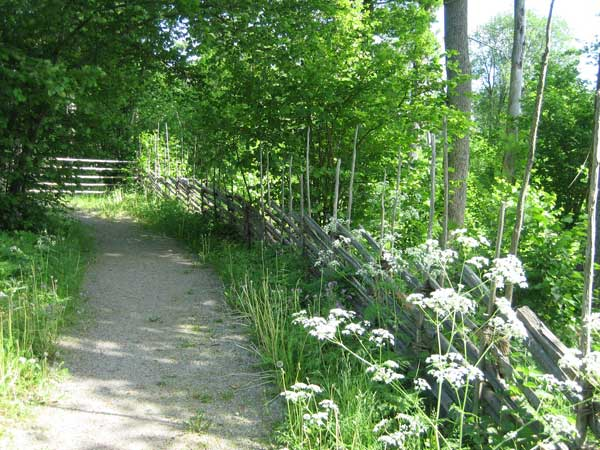
A pedestrian path in the castle's park (ca 2009)

== See also ==
- List of castles in Sweden
