= Violet Plimmer =

British biologist (1885–1949)

Violet Geraldine Plimmer (née Sheffield; 2 May 1885 – 4 July 1949) was a British biologist and writer on nutrition. She wrote four books for the general public on the topic of healthy nutrition (the first two co-authored with her husband, the biochemist R. H. A. Plimmer): Vitamins and the Choice of Food (1922); Food, Health, Vitamins (1925), which was among the most popular interwar books on nutrition; Food Values at a Glance (1935), another popular work; and Food Values in Wartime (1941). She also wrote pamphlets and articles for newspapers, journals and magazines. Her obituarist, Katharine H. Coward, considers her works to have had a "very far-reaching effect" on the health of people across Britain.

== Biography ==
Violet Sheffield was born on 2 May 1885 to Mary and Frederick Sheffield; her father was a solicitor. She studied at University College, London in around 1905–1910, initially studying French, and then sciences including geology, botany, zoology, comparative anatomy, physiology, histology and physiological chemistry, obtaining a gold medal in physiology. Her studies were interrupted by her marriage on 21 March 1912 to Robert Henry Aders Plimmer, a chemist and biochemist who was then reader in physiological chemistry at University College. During the First World War, he was employed performing chemical analysis of foods for the War Office, and both he and Violet Plimmer became interested in healthy nutrition.

After the war, in 1919, R. H. A. Plimmer took up the position of head of the biochemical laboratory at the Rowett Institute of Research in Animal Nutrition in Aberdeen, and Violet Plimmer also worked at the institute in an unpaid capacity. R. H. A. Plimmer gave popular lectures on the then-novel subject of vitamins to students and societies at Aberdeen University. The couple returned to London in January 1922, with R. H. A. Plimmer taking up the chair of medical chemistry at St Thomas's Hospital Medical School. There, encouraged by the positive reception that his lectures on vitamins had received, they co-wrote Vitamins and the Choice of Food (1922), intended as a review of the topic that could be read by a layperson. Violet Plimmer was credited as an associate of the Royal Sanitary Institute. In 1925 the couple co-wrote a pamphlet, "Vitamins – What We Should Eat and Why?", and that year the first edition of their popular book, later entitled Food, Health, Vitamins, appeared.

In 1935, Violet Plimmer published Food Values at a Glance, and Food Values in War-time followed in 1941. In addition to her books, she often wrote for newspapers, journals and magazines such as New Health on the topic of food and health, providing practical, easily understood advice, and was active on the committee of the New Health Society. She also provided illustrations for a biology textbook.

The Plimmers had three daughters and a son; the family lived in Hampstead. Violet Plimmer died on 4 July 1949.

== Works ==
In her obituary in Nature, Katharine H. Coward considers that Violet Plimmer's works would have had a "very far-reaching effect" on health across Britain, both during the Second World War and in the post-war period. The historian Nicos Kefalas comments that publishing with a mainstream educational publisher (all four books were published by Longmans) may have made the Plimmers' books appear more authoritative; he adds that, in a genre then dominated by male writers where many of the readers would have been middle- or upper-class women, the authors being a man and a woman might have made the advice appear more trustworthy.

Vitamins and the Choice of Food succeeded in its goal of being comprehensible to a lay reader. A contemporary review in the Medical Journal of Australia describes the book as "clearly expressed" and "interesting", as well as "sound" and "wisely planned", but criticises its limited treatment of mineral nutrients. A review for the British Medical Journal praises its clear treatment of diseases caused by nutrient deficiencies but criticises its oversimplified discussion of rickets, which at that date was not fully understood. Its successor, Food, Health, Vitamins, became one of the most popular interwar books on nutrition, and was reissued in nine editions, the last in 1942. It emphasises whole foods such as wholemeal flour, fruit and vegetables, which are good sources of vitamins, over artificial, highly processed foods, stating that "civilisation has made it too easy to get the wrong foods of all kinds". It puts forward the idea of a "square meal" containing balanced nutrients and excluding foods such as white bread that it characterises as unhealthy; a glowing review of the fifth edition in Nature proclaims that its square meal chart "should be hung up over every housekeeper's desk".

Food Values at a Glance was another popular text, which continued to be reprinted as late as 1959. Coward comments that it was very useful not only for home use but also for those producing school meals and similar bulk catering. Jack Drummond praises its concision, practicality and ease of reading, in a contemporary review. The book continues to promote the square meal, with 25 colour-coded charts illustrating how to plan balanced meals; a contemporary review in the British Medical Journal describes it as "excellent" for people who prefer the "pictorial method of acquiring knowledge". According to Kefalas, Plimmer argues that it was a woman's social duty to provide healthy food for her family, an argument framed in terms of national productivity losses from illness, as well as the fact that poorly nourished men were unfit for military service. Both Food Values at a Glance and the earlier Food, Health, Vitamins state that a wide range of illnesses were associated with malnutrition, and imply, Kefalas suggests, that maintaining one's health was a simple matter of correctly planned meals.

Coward commends Plimmer's final book, Food Values in War-time, as "practical and readable" for those attempting to provide healthy meals during food rationing, commenting that, for many readers, the book may have provided the earliest advice to select food for its health qualities. Like the earlier books it recommends wholemeal flour, and it also defends the unpopular national loaf. The book includes a review of dietary habits from 1740.

== Selected publications ==
- Violet G. Plimmer, R. H. A. Plimmer. Vitamins and the Choice of Food (Longmans, Green and Co.; 1922) (Note: Reviews of Vitamins and the Choice of Food:)
- R. H. A. Plimmer, V. Plimmer. "Vitamins – What We Should Eat and Why?" (People's Health League; 1925), pamphlet
- R. H. A. Plimmer, Violet G. Plimmer. Food, Health, Vitamins (originally Food and Health) (Longmans, Green and Co.; nine editions in 1925–42) (Note: Reviews of Food and Health and Food, Health, Vitamins:)
- Violet G. Plimmer. Food Values at a Glance and How to Plan a Healthy Diet (Longmans, Green and Co.; multiple editions 1935–59) (Note: Reviews of Food Values at a Glance and How to Plan a Healthy Diet:)
- Violet G. Plimmer. Food Values in War-time (Longmans, Green and Co.; 1941, 1943) (Note: Reviews of Food Values in War-time:)

== References and notes ==
Sources

- Nicos Kefalas. Self-help and self-promotion: dietary advice and agency in North America and Britain. In: Balancing the Self: Medicine, Politics and the Regulation of Health in the Twentieth Century (Mark Jackson, Martin D. Moore, eds), pp. 127–157 (Manchester University Press; 2020) doi:10.7765/9781526132123.00013
- James Vernon. You Are What You Eat: Educating the Citizen as Consumer. In: Hunger: A Modern History, pp. 196–235 (Harvard University Press; 2007) doi:10.4159/9780674044678-007
- Ina Zweiniger-Bargielowska. The Modern Female Body as a Mass Phenomenon. In: Managing the Body: Beauty, Health, and Fitness in Britain 1880–1939, pp. 236–278 (Oxford University Press; 2011 [2010]) doi:10.1093/acprof:oso/9780199280520.003.0007
- Ina Zweiniger-Bargielowska. "Not a Complete Food for Man": The Controversy about White versus Wholemeal Bread in Interwar Britain. In: Setting Nutritional Standards: Theory, Policies, Practices (Elizabeth Neswald, David F. Smith, Ulrike Thoms, eds), pp. 142–164 (University of Rochester Press; 2017) Project Muse: 83673
