= R. H. A. Plimmer =

British chemist (1877–1955)

Robert Henry Aders Plimmer

Robert Henry Aders Plimmer (25 April 1877 – 18 June 1955) was a British chemist, biochemist and author, who researched protein chemistry, especially the phosphorylation of proteins, and nutrition, particularly vitamins and the nutritional qualities of different proteins. He worked at the physiology department of University College, London (1904–19), latterly as reader in physiological chemistry, briefly headed the biochemistry department at the Rowett Institute of Research in Animal Nutrition in Aberdeen, and then returned to London to hold a chair in the chemistry department of St Thomas's Hospital Medical School (1922–42), and in retirement worked at the British Postgraduate Medical School (1943–55).

Plimmer's academic books include the monograph The Chemical Constitution of the Proteins (1908), the textbook Organic and Bio-Chemistry (1910), and the earliest food-composition tabulations relating to British foods (1921). With his wife, Violet Geraldine Plimmer, he published several popular books about nutrition for a general audience, including Vitamins and the Choice of Food (1922) and Food, Health, Vitamins (1925), whose "square meal" chart one reviewer advises "should be hung up over every housekeeper's desk". He is also remembered for his role in the foundation and early years of the Biochemical Society; he was the body's first honorary secretary and treasurer, twice chaired the committee (1922–23 and 1939–40), and was elected an honorary member in 1943. He published a history of the society in 1949 that is considered a valuable source for the history of biochemistry in the UK.

== Early life and education ==
Robert Henry Aders was born on 25 April 1877, at Elberfeld in Germany, the eldest son of Bertha Helena Aders, who was German, and Alfred Aders (died 1885), a businessman from Manchester. He was brought up in England, mainly in Surrey. Two years after his father's death, his mother married Henry George Plimmer, a pathologist and microbiologist who was later elected a Fellow of the Royal Society, and Robert Aders eventually came to use his stepfather's surname. (Note: He largely published as R. H. A. Plimmer, but R. H. Aders Plimmer also occurs and his earliest papers appeared under the name R. H. Aders.) He attended Dulwich College and then went up to University College, London, studying organic chemistry, where he gained his BSc (1899) and DSc (1902).

Before being awarded his DSc degree, he also studied with Carl Graebe at the University of Geneva, and then researched enzymes and protein chemistry for two years under Emil Fischer at the University of Berlin, gaining a PhD (1902) from Berlin. He returned to the UK to become a research student at the Jenner Institute of Preventive Medicine (later the Lister Institute; 1902–4).

== Career ==
Plimmer joined the staff of University College in 1904, where he became a fellow (1906), and then assistant professor (1907–12) and reader (1912–19) in physiological chemistry, working in the physiology department under William Bayliss and Ernest Starling. Other collaborators at University College included Frederick Hughes Scott and Marjory Stephenson, in her first research job. With Starling, Plimmer was involved in designing the new Institute of Physiology at University College (opened in 1909). At University College, Plimmer taught physiological chemistry from 1909, and was one of the earliest in Britain to teach advanced biochemistry.

During the First World War, he worked for the War Office's Hygiene Directorate and the Army Medical Authorities, with the rank of Captain, performing chemical analysis of foods at the Royal Army Medical College in Millbank, as well as at University College. These results, published in 1921, were the "first official British food composition tables" and, according to a contemporary review, were particularly useful in Britain because they analysed British foods. His obituary in the British Medical Journal states that his work "directly contributed to the national survival". Plimmer moved to Aberdeen in October 1919, to continue this work; there he served as head of the department of biochemistry at the Rowett Institute of Research in Animal Nutrition. He resigned after coming into conflict with the director, John Boyd Orr, over the question of whether the institute should focus predominantly on mineral nutrients.

Returning to London, he held the chair of medical chemistry at St Thomas's Hospital Medical School, University of London, between January 1922 and his retirement in December 1942, being appointed emeritus professor of chemistry in 1944. He continued to research despite a heavy teaching and administrative burden. After retirement from St Thomas's, he took up a post at the department of biochemistry of the British Postgraduate Medical School, Hammersmith Hospital, where he continued to lecture and to research in analytical clinical chemistry until shortly before his death.

== Research ==
Plimmer's major research interests fell into main two areas. The first strand, the chemistry of proteins, especially phosphoproteins, as well as that of other phosphorus-containing biomolecules, originated from his work under Fischer, and continued throughout his career. His obituarist for The Times calls him a "leading authority" in this field. His 1906 paper on phosphorylation of casein, co-authored with Bayliss, is among the early reports of phosphorylated proteins, following reports by Friedrich Miescher and others. One of his highest-cited papers is a 1941 publication on the synthesis of phosphoric ester derivatives of amino acids, one of his last studies before bombing interrupted his work in London.

The second strand, nutrition in humans and animals, originated in his work during the First World War. At Aberdeen he carried out animal-feeding experiments, particularly focusing on vitamins and the nutritional qualities of different proteins. He showed at Aberdeen that pigs fed cooked food developed physical deficits and could be cured by substituting raw food, hypothesising that destruction of what is now known as vitamin C during cooking was the cause. He also researched what ratios of vitamins were needed by intensively farmed chickens. He continued this work at St Thomas's, raising poultry on the department roof. For example, with his colleagues John Lewis Rosedale and William Henry Raymond, he researched vitamin B requirements in chicks, ducks, pigeons and rats, before it was proved that there was more than one B vitamin, and later, in studies using pigeons, chickens and rats with Rosedale, Raymond and John Lowndes, he quantified total vitamin B in cereals, pulses and nuts, and showed that fruit and vegetables are deficient in vitamin B_{1}.

== Writing, public education and the Biochemical Society ==
With Frederick Gowland Hopkins, he co-edited the series Monographs in Biochemistry (from 1908), for which Plimmer wrote The Chemical Constitution of the Proteins, described as a "veritable godsend" in a contemporary review in Nature. His other books include the textbook, Organic and Bio-Chemistry, described by Arthur Harden as "extremely valuable" for a broader audience than just the intended medical students.

Plimmer helped to educate people about vitamins, which were then not well known to the general public. He is described, together with V. H. Mottram, as one of the "most energetic popularizers of nutrition" in the interwar period. With his wife Violet he wrote Vitamins and the Choice of Food (1922); they later adapted this for a popular audience as Food, Health, Vitamins (1925), which ran to nine editions. A glowing review of the fifth edition in Nature proclaims that its "square meal" chart "should be hung up over every housekeeper's desk". The couple co-wrote several other popular books on this topic, and Violet Plimmer later authored two books alone. Plimmer campaigned for wholemeal flour, contributed articles on nutrition to magazines, and gave many public lectures including a Royal Institution lecture in 1921 entitled "Quality of Protein in Nutrition". During the Second World War, with food rationing, he was active in educating the British public on diet and food quality as a council member of the Food Education Society; in 1943, he gave a lecture entitled "Food Facts And Fallacies", reported in The Times, which recommended consumption of cheese, tomatoes, and dehydrated milk and vegetables, suggested daily energy requirements of 2200–3000 calories, and counselled families to prioritise growing children rather than adults when apportioning rationed food.

Plimmer was instrumental in the founding of the Biochemical Society in 1911; he served as both the first honorary treasurer (1911–12) and secretary (1911–19), and was twice the chair (1922–23 and 1939–40). The biochemist John Lowndes, in his obituary for the society's journal, comments that the majority of the body's work in the early years became Plimmer's responsibility, and "his patience, perseverance and tact" were key to the society not failing. As their first historian, he also wrote a history of the society's early years, The History of the Biochemical Society 1911–1949, described in a contemporary review for Nature as "pithy" and a "model of its kind". The science historian Robert E. Kohler characterises the book as an "important" source for the early history of biochemistry in the UK. The society elected Plimmer an honorary member in 1943.

== Personal life ==
In 1912, Plimmer married Violet Geraldine (née Sheffield; died 1949), a biologist, artist and illustrator whose father was a solicitor; they had three daughters and a son. His interests included motoring – he held one of the first driving licences, and enjoyed touring in Europe – as well as attending concerts and festivals of classical music.

He died at Hammersmith Hospital on 18 June 1955. His memorial service took place at Hammersmith Hospital's chapel, with a tribute being given by Charles Newman, Dean of the Postgraduate Medical School. A collection of his papers was held at St Thomas's Hospital.

== Selected publications ==
Sole-authored books

- The Chemical Changes and Products Resulting from Fermentations (Longmans, Green and Co.; 1903)
- Translation of Gustav von Bunge's Text-book of Organic Chemistry for Medical Students (Longmans, Green and Co.; 1907)
- The Chemical Constitution of the Proteins (two volumes; Monographs in Biochemistry series; Longmans, Green and Co.; 1908, 1913)
- Organic and Bio-Chemistry (originally entitled Practical Physiological Chemistry and later Practical Organic and Bio-chemistry; Longmans, Green and Co., six editions in 1910–38)
- Analyses and Energy Values of Foods (H. M. Stationery Office; 1921)
- The History of the Biochemical Society 1911–1949 (Cambridge University Press; 1949)

Books and pamphlets with Violet G. Plimmer

- Vitamins and the Choice of Food (Longmans, Green and Co.; 1922)
- "Vitamins – What We Should Eat and Why?" (People's Health League; 1925), pamphlet
- Food, Health, Vitamins (originally Food and Health) (Longmans, Green and Co.; nine editions in 1925–42)

Review article

- R. H. Aders Plimmer (1907). The work of Emil Fischer and his school on the chemistry of the proteins. Science Progress in the Twentieth Century 2 (5): 88–120 link

Research papers

- R. H. A. Plimmer (1941). Esters of phosphoric acid: Phosphoryl hydroxyamino-acids. Biochemical Journal 35 (4): 461–69 doi:10.1042/bj0350461 PMC 1265516
- Robert Henry Aders Plimmer, John Lewis Rosedale, William Henry Raymond, John Lowndes (1927). Experiments on Nutrition. VIII: Comparative Vitamin B Value of Foodstuffs. Cereals. I. Biochemical Journal 21 (5): 1141–61 doi:10.1042/bj0211141
- R. H. A. Plimmer, W. M. Bayliss (1906). The separation of phosphorus from caseinogen by the action of enzymes and alkali. Journal of Physiology 33 (6): 439–61 doi:10.1113/jphysiol.1906.sp001130 PMC 1465763
- R. H. Aders Plimmer (1906). On the presence of lactase in the intestines of animals and on the adaptation of the intestine to lactose. Journal of Physiology 35 (1–2): 20–31 doi:10.1113/jphysiol.1906.sp001178 PMC 1465817
