= Plummer (surname) =

Plummer is a surname, derived from the occupation of plumber. Notable people with the name include:

== Arts and entertainment ==
- Amanda Plummer (born 1957), Canadian-US film, television and stage actress, daughter of Christopher Plummer
- Charlie Plummer (born 1999), US film actor
- Christopher Plummer (1929–2021), Canadian film and theatre actor
- David Plummer (musician) (fl. 1990s–present), English-born musician and collaborator on children's books
- Denyse Plummer (1953–2023), Trinidadian calypsonian and gospel singer
- Glenn Plummer (born 1961), US film and television actor
- Inez Plummer (c. 1885–1964), US stage actress
- Jessica Plummer (born 1992), English actress and singer
- Joe Plummer (fl. 1990–2000s), Canadian musician
- John Plummer (c. 1410–c. 1483), English composer
- Lincoln Plumer (1875–1928), US film actor, also frequently listed as Lincoln Plummer
- Louise Plummer (fl. 1985–present), US author
- Sanford Plummer (1905–1974), US American Indian artist
- Scotty Plummer (1961–1992), US musician

== Military and law enforcement ==
- Charles Plummer (sheriff) (fl. 1957–2007), US police officer in California
- Charles W. Plummer (1890–1918), American military aviator
- Henry Plummer (1832–1864), US historical figure, sheriff in Montana
- Joseph B. Plummer (1816–1862), US military leader
- Norman Plummer (1924–1999), English war hero and footballer
- Raymond Eugene Plummer (1913–1987), US attorney and judge

== Politics ==
- Albert Plummer (1840–1912) US physician and legislator
- Beatrice Plummer, Baroness Plummer (1903–1972), British Peeress
- Desmond Plummer (1914–2009), English politician
- Franklin E. Plummer (died 1847), US political figure
- Orlando Plummer (1836–1913), US physician and political figure

== Science and medicine ==
- Andrew Plummer (1697–1756), professor of chemistry and medicine, University of Edinburgh
- Dave Plummer (1968–), Canadian-American computer programmer
- Henry Crozier Keating Plummer (1875–1946), English astronomer
- Henry Stanley Plummer (1874–1936), US physician instrumental in founding the Mayo Clinic
- Ruth Plummer (fl. 2003–present), British cancer researcher
- Violet Plummer (1873–1962), South Australian physician
- Ward Plummer (1940–2020), US physicist

== Sports ==
- Ahmed Plummer (born 1976), US football player
- Bill Plummer (1947–2024), US baseball player
- Calvin Plummer (born 1963), English footballer
- Chris Plummer (born 1976), English footballer
- Dwayne Plummer (born 1978), English footballer
- Elton Plummer (1914–1988), Australian Rules footballer
- Elwood Plummer, American basketball coach
- Federico Plummer (1929–2004), Panamanian boxer
- Gary Plummer (basketball) (born 1962), Israeli-American basketball player
- Gary Plummer (American football) (born 1960), American football player
- Harold Plummer (fl. 1929–1933), English footballer
- Harry Plummer (Australian footballer) (1912–1993), Australian rules footballer
- Jake Plummer (born 1974), US football player
- Jason Plummer (swimmer) (1969–2021), Australian swimmer
- Karen Plummer (born 1951), New Zealand cricketer
- Kathryn Plummer (born 1998), American volleyball player
- Konya Plummer (born 1997), Jamaican (women's soccer) footballer
- Matty Plummer (born 1989), English footballer
- Nick Plummer (born 1996), American baseball player
- Norma Plummer (born 1944), Australian netball player
- Norman Plummer (1924–1999), English war hero and footballer
- Peter Plummer (born 1947), English cricketer
- Reg Plummer (field hockey) (born 1953), Canadian field hockey player
- Reg Plummer (rugby union) (1888–1953), Welsh rugby player
- Scott Plummer (born 1966), Australian cricketer
- Tristan Plummer (born 1990), English footballer

== Other ==
- Alfred Plummer (1841–1926), Master of University College Durham and contributor to the Cambridge Bible for Schools and Colleges
- Brian Plummer (1936–2003), Welsh writer and dog breeder
- Charles F. Plummer (1879–1939), American architect
- Charles Plummer (historian) (1857–1927), English historian
- Chester Plummer (1945–1976), US taxi driver, killed while trying to invade the White House in 1976
- Edward C. Plummer (1863–1932), American historian
- George Winslow Plummer (1876–1944), founder of Societas Rosicruciana in America
- Howard Z. Plummer (1899–1980), US Christian minister
- Leslie Plummer (1901–1963), English newspaper executive
- James Henry Plummer (1848–1932), Canadian financier
- James W. Plummer (1920–2013), American Director of the National Reconnaissance Office
- Mary Plummer (1849–1922), US figure, wife of Georges Clemenceau
- Penelope Plummer (born 1949), Australian model
- Rachel Plummer (1818–1839), US writer who was kidnapped by Comanche Indians

== Fictional characters ==
- Evelyn Plummer, a character in British soap opera Coronation Street
- Polly Plummer, fictional main character in The Magician's Nephew
