= Henry George Plimmer =

British medical researcher and doctor (1856/57–1918)

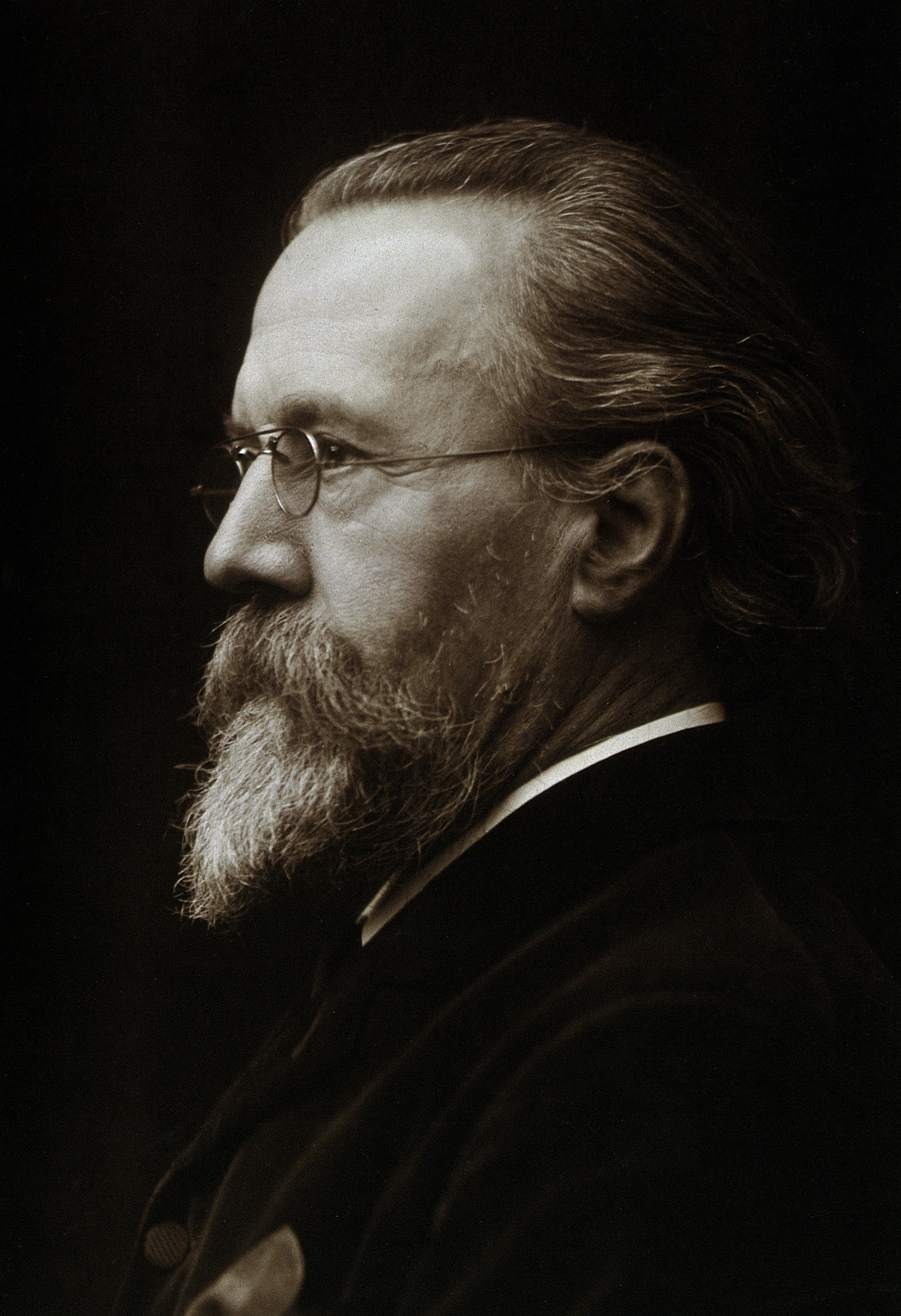
Henry George Plimmer in 1917

Henry George Plimmer (29 January 1856/57 – 22 June 1918) was a British doctor and medical researcher known for his studies in cancer, comparative pathology, bacteriology and parasitology. He studied the histology of cancers, identifying inclusion bodies, and promoted the idea that cancer might have an infectious cause. His microbiological research includes work on diphtheria, trypanosomes and trench fever. He worked at the Cancer Hospital and St Mary's Hospital, London, directed the cancer laboratories of the Lister Institute (1902–15), and held the first chair in comparative pathology at Imperial College of Science and Technology (1915–18). He was an elected fellow of the Linnean Society and of the Royal Society, and was president of the Royal Microscopical Society (1911–12).

== Early life and education ==
Plimmer was born on 29 January of 1856 or 1857 (Note: Sources differ as to the year: 1856 is given by obituaries in the Journal of the Royal Microscopical Society and Proceedings of the Royal Society of London B: Biological Sciences, as well as the Royal Society's records, while 1857 is stated or implied by obituaries in The Lancet, British Medical Journal and The Times.) in Melksham, Wiltshire, to George Plimmer (died 1865), a doctor, and his second wife, Eliza (née Eyres; died 1896). He was educated at Shaw House School near Melksham until 1870. The family was poorly provided for after his father's death and, shortly after leaving school, Plimmer took a job as a clerk at the Coalbrookdale Company in Ironbridge, Shropshire (1871–78), where his mother's brother had influence.

In 1878, he became an assistant to J. H. Dalton, a doctor at Norwood, south London, who had formerly practised under his father, and his partner Sidney Turner. Plimmer studied medicine at Guy's Hospital (1878–83), while continuing to work at the Norwood practice and from 1882 as prosector in anatomy of the Royal College of Surgeons, qualifying L.S.A. (1882) and M.R.C.S. (1883).

== Career ==
Plimmer was made a partner in the busy south London practice with Dalton and Turner, and remained in general medical practice until 1892. During this period he carried out innovative surgeries, including a hysterectomy and treatment of an ectopic pregnancy; according to his obituary in The Lancet these procedures were "the first of their kind in this country".

From 1892 he focused on research in the fields of pathology, cancer and microbiology (both bacteriology and parasitology), initially at King's College, London under E. M. Crookshank, and then at the Royal College of Surgeons and the British Institute of Preventive Medicine (1893), where he worked with Armand Ruffer. From 1894, he was pathologist to the Cancer Hospital and later (Note: Sources differ as to the date, variously given as 1895, 1896 and 1898.) joined St Mary's Hospital, London, first as bacteriologist and lecturer in bacteriology, and from 1899 as pathologist and lecturer in pathology. In 1902 he moved to the newly founded Lister Institute as head of its cancer laboratories. He was also pathologist of the Zoological Society of London (1907–17). In 1915 he became the first holder of the chair in comparative pathology at Imperial College of Science and Technology, which he occupied until his death.

== Research ==
An expert microscopist, Plimmer studied the histology of cancers, identifying inclusions in cancer cells later termed "Plimmer's bodies" in 1892. He later found that some inclusion-like entities were actually yeast cells infecting various cancers, but went on to show that they did not cause the tumour. He performed early experiments on the radium bromide treatment of cancer. He wrote several reviews on cancer, and promoted the idea that cancers had an infectious cause, now known to be the case for some cancers.

With Ruffer in the early 1890s, he did early work on the bacterial disease diphtheria, for example, making antitoxin to diphtheria toxin. During the First World War he researched tetanus, and particularly trench fever.

He started to research trypanosomes in 1898, with J. Rose Bradford, and from the following year much of his work focused on these and other protozoan parasites. He pioneered the use of anti-trypanosome preparations of antimony in rats and other animals, later successfully used in humans by W. B. Fry and H. S. Ranken. Plimmer also worked on the protozoan Toxoplasma, and published reports on parasites found in the blood of animals who died at London Zoo.

== Personal life ==
In 1887, he married Helena, the widow of Alfred Aders; they lived in Norwood, Sydenham (from 1889) and St John's Wood (after 1896). One of his stepchildren was the chemist and biochemist R. H. A. Plimmer. H. G. Plimmer was a gifted amateur pianist and musician, described as "well known in the musical world". He was briefly the organist at Coalbrookdale Church, and in later life gave private piano recitals, attended musical festivals in Europe and published articles on music. He was also interested in literature, and corresponded with John Ruskin, George Meredith and others. He served as president of the Omar Khayyám Club (1911).

He died on 22 June 1918 at Sevenoaks. His remains were cremated at Golders Green. An Imperial College fellowship was established in his name for the study of pathology, anatomy, microbiology or related disciplines.

== Honours and societies ==
He was an elected fellow of the Linnean Society (1890) and of the Royal Society (1910), and prepared an early catalogue of engraved prints held by the Royal Society in 1917. He served as president of the Royal Microscopical Society in 1911–12.

== Selected publications ==
- Henry George Plimmer (1916). Notes on the genus Toxoplasma, with a description of three new species. Proceedings of the Royal Society of London B: Biological Sciences 89 (616): 291–96 doi:10.1098/rspb.1916.0015
- H. G. Plimmer (1912). On the Blood-Parasites found in Animals in the Zoological Gardens during the four years 1908–11. Proceedings of the Zoological Society of London 82 (2): 406–19 doi:10.1111/j.1469-7998.1912.tb07026.x
- Henry George Plimmer, John Deas Thomson (1908). Further results of the experimental treatment of trypanosomiasis in rats; being a progress report of a committee of the Royal Society. Proceedings of the Royal Society of London B: Biological Sciences 80 (536): 1–10 doi:10.1098/rspb.1908.0001
- H. G. Plimmer (1903). The parasitic theory of cancer. British Medical Journal 2 (2241): 1511–15 doi:10.1136/bmj.2.2241.1511, PMID 20761234
- Henry George Plimmer, John Rose Bradford (1900). A preliminary note on the morphology and distribution of the organism found in the Tsetse Fly disease. Proceedings of the Royal Society of London 65 (413–22): 274–81 doi:10.1098/rspl.1899.0032
